= History of Damascus (book) =

12th-century literary work by Ibn Asakir

Tarikh Dimashq
- Author: Ibn Asakir
- Language: Arabic
- Subject: History, Biography, Hadith
- Publisher: Dar al-Kutub al-'Ilmiyya
- Publication date: 2012
- Publication place: Lebanon
- Pages: 21568
- ISBN: 9782745160966

The History of Damascus (Arabic: تاريخ دمشق, romanized: Tarikh Dimashq) is a major classical Islamic encyclopedic work and at 8.1 million words is considered the largest biographical dictionary produced in history by a medieval Muslim historian, Ibn Asakir.

== Description ==
The History of Damascus, it is considered one of the largest and most important books in the history of Islam. In it, the author dealt with the history of the city of Damascus, and spoke about the biographies of notables and narrators and their narrations from everyone who lived, neighboring, or passed through the city of Damascus. It was not only limited to the assessment of narrators of hadith, Ilm ar-Rijal, but also includes historical and political figures. When it comes to Islamic figures, Ibn Asakir tried to collect everything that has been said about that figure, true or false, with full chain of narration. It also contains a huge collection of Arabic poems. It is an encyclopaedic work in 80 volumes.

The history of Damascus is predominantly a biographical dictionary. It observes the holiness of Syria, with Damascus being its center by recording the lives and achievements of known figures- both men and women including religious figures, scholars and politicians and so on who lived in the region or merely passed through, from the era of the biblical patriarchs and matriarchs all the way down to the era of Ibn 'Asakir. History of Damascus preserves extensive historical data from hundreds of now-lost books authored by Muslim historians and scholars before Ibn Asakir's age. Consequently, it is a trusted source in understanding of medieval Syria and Islamic history.

== Abridgement ==
The Islamic scholar Abd Al-Qadir Badran made a summarized version of this book. In his introduction to his abridged version, he writes: "However, the author has made it too long by including every chain of transmission, and a repetition of events which was acceptable in his own time. But nowadays it has been neglected because people now find such repetition tedious. Nevertheless, people these days could benefit immensely by this book. Therefore, I decided to reproduce it to them without the repetition and the chains of transmission. I rose up to the challenge, ridding its text of repetition, and leaving chains of transmission in the original work for anyone who needs them. Thus anyone who reads my version will not miss anything of the original and will not be bored by its extensive details."

"I also clarified events as much as possible, and indicated the grades of authenticity of the Hadiths mentioned, and corrected whatever has been distorted of its vocabulary by copy writers."

== Influence ==
Due to the immense influence and prestige of Tarikh Dimashq (History of Damascus), other similar biographical works would later appear such as Tarikh al-Islam al-kabir ('Great History of Islam) by Al-Dhahabi, Zubdat al-Halab fi ta'arikh Halab (The Cream of the History of Aleppo) by Ibn al-Adim, Al-Nujūm al-Zāhirah fī Mulūk Miṣr wa-al-Qāhirah (The Shinning Stars Concerning the Kings of Egypt and Cairo) by Ibn Taghribirdi and, finally Tarikh-i Bayhaq (The History of Bayhaq) by Abu'l-Hasan Bayhaqi.

== Reception ==
Ibn Khallikan quotes his teacher: "Our sheikh, the Hafiz Zaki al-Din Al-Mundhiri, said to me, and this date was mentioned and the hadeeth was long in his matter: (I do not think that this man except that he determined to put this date from the day he reasoned on himself and he started collecting from that time, otherwise the age is too short to collect People like this book."

Ibn Khallikan comments: "He (i.e. Al-Mundhiri) has said the truth. Whoever knows this book can appreciate his statement. How can any man find the time to write such a book, considering that he only composed it after having made a number of drafts which he revised and corrected. He also wrote other works of value and great interest. His poetry is of good standard."

== See also ==
- List of Sunni books
- History of Baghdad
- History of Nishapur
- The Complete History
