= Lisan al-Mizan =

Book by Ibn Hajar al-Asqalani

- Author: Ibn Hajar al-Asqalani (d.852 AH)
- Original title: لسان الميزان
- Language: Arabic
- Genre: Ilm al-Rijal (عِلْمُ الرِّجال) Biographical evaluation

Lisan al-Mizan (Arabic: لسان الميزان, romanized: Lisān al-Mīzān) is one of the classic book of Ilm al-Rijal (Science of Narrators or Biographical evaluation) written by Hafiz Ibn Hajar al-Asqalani (d.852 AH) in the 9th century of Islamic History.

== Description ==
This book is actually the rework of Imam al-Dhahabi book by the name of Mizan al-Itidal. Ibn Hijr has refined it, made this work expansive and named it as Lisan al-Mizan. It is one of the most popular book in the field of Ilm al-Rijal (Science of Narrators or Biographical evaluation) and contains more than 6000 pages.

== Publications ==
The book has been published by many organizations around the world:

- Lisan al-Mizan 10 Books in 4 VOLUMES (لسان الميزان) Ibn Hajar: Published: Maktab al-Matbu'at al-Islamiyyah | Beirut, Lebanon
- Lisan al-Mizan (8 Vol) لسان الميزان by Ibn Hajar: Published:DKI, Beirut, 2010

== See also ==
- List of Sunni books
- Kutub al-Sittah
