= History of Baghdad (book) =

11th-century literary work by Al-Khatib al-Baghdadi

Tarikh Baghdad
- Editor: Mustafa Abdul Qadir 'Ata
- Author: Al-Khatib al-Baghdadi
- Language: Arabic
- Subject: History, Biography, Hadith
- Publisher: Dar al-Kotob al-Ilmiyah (DKI)
- Publication place: Lebanon
- Pages: 9872
- ISBN: 9782745104663

History of Baghdad (Arabic: تاريخ بغداد, romanized: Tarikh Baghdad) is a major classical Islamic biographical dictionary written by the medieval Muslim historian, Al-Khatib al-Baghdadi.

== Description ==
This immense encyclopedic work contains more than 7,831 biographies of the lives of scholars, thinkers, aristocrats, famous men and women connected to Baghdad from the earliest period of the city. It was compiled according to the method of hadith scholars, and included many benefits in it. In this book, the author includes previous lost manuscripts that explain the history of Baghdad. Thus al-Baghdadi's work is considered extremely valuable for preserving the titles of these books and the names of their authors, especially since there is no other reference than Tarikh Baghdad (History of Baghdad). Nonetheless, it served as a reference for verifying the reliability of Hadith transmitters and also a valuable source for saints. The author explains the city in details during the Islamic Golden Age when it was the world's greatest city of its time sharing us the imperial spender of the city's physical image and the intellectual climate created by its thousands of scholars and pious individuals. It is considered one of the most rich genres of Arabic and Persian historiography during the middle ages. It is an encyclopaedic book consisting of 23 volumes.

== Abridgement ==
Several supplements (continuation) were made for Tarikh Baghdad and among them were:

- Ibn al-Sam'ani entitled 'A Continuation of the History of Baghdad' in 15 volumes.
- Ibn al-Dubaythi entitled 'Continuation of History on the City of Peace' in 5 volumes.
- Ibn al-Najjar entitled 'A [Useful] Extract from the continuation of the Ta'rikh Baghdad' in 30 volumes.

== Influence ==
This book would inspire later historians to write their own version of encyclopaedia of their major cities such as Ibn Asakir who authored History of Damascus.

== Reception ==
The Lebanese Hadith scholar, Gibril Haddad stated:

"Tarikh Baghdad ("History of Baghdad"), his most important work. Ostensibly a history of Baghdad, it is more specifically a reference work in narrator-authentication (‘ilm al-rijâl) and a valuable compendium of 4,385 hadiths narrated with their full chains, over half of them (2,253) not found in the two books of Sahih and the four Sunan. In this respect al-Khatib’s rank as an independent narrator is comparable to that of Al-Bayhaqi (d. 458), Ibn 'Abd al-Barr (d. 463), and Ibn Asakir (d. 571)."

== See also ==
- List of Sunni books
- History of Damascus
- History of Nishapur
- The Complete History
