= Samani =

Samani may refer to:

== Places ==
- Samani District, Hokkaido, Japan
- Samani, Hokkaido, a town in Hidaka Subprefecture, Hokkaido, Japan

== People ==
- Samani (Assyrian king), the 19th Assyrian monarch.
- Samani Pulepule (1923–2013), Samoan minister

=== Surname ===
- Ahmad Samani (?-914), Samanid amir
- Aḥmad Samʿānī (1094–1140), Arab scholar
- Ismail Samani (849–907), Samanid amir of Transoxiana
- Jack Samani (born 1979), Solomon Islands footballer
- Laura Samani (born 1989), Italian film director and screenwriter
- Laydah Samani (born 1992), Solomon Islands women's footballer
- Nilesh Samani (born 1956), British physician
- Reza Samani (born 1977), Iranian musician

== Other uses ==
- Samani (wheat), green sprouting wheat in Azerbaijan

== See also ==
- Al-Sam'ani (disambiguation)
