= Zaynab bint Umar ibn al-Kindi =

13th-century Islamic scholar

Zainab Bint ‘Umar Bin Kindi
- زينب بنت عمر بن كندي

Personal life
- Died: 699 AH / c. 1300 CE Baalbek, (present Lebanon)
- Region: the region of Syria
- Main interest: Hadith
- Occupation: Islamic scholar

Religious life
- Religion: Islam
- Denomination: Sunni

Muslim leader
- Influenced by: Ibn Khuzaymah
- Influenced: Al-Dhahabi, Ibn Hajar Asqalani

Zainab Bint ‘Umar Bin Kindi (Arabic: زينب بنت عمر بن كندي) (died 699 Hijri / c. 1300 CE) was a female muhaddith in 13th century Damascus and Baalbek. She is most notable for being the most prominent "shaykha" or teacher of the Muslim scholar and historian Al-Dhahabi.

== Biography ==
=== Scholarship ===
She received permissions (ijazah) to narrate from Al-Muayid al-Tusi, Abu Ruh al-Harawi, Zainab al-Sha’riyah, Al-Qasim Ibn-al-Saaffar, Abdul-Baqa al-Uqbari, ‘Abdul-‘Adhim Bin ‘Abdal-Latif al-Sharabi, and Ahmed Bin Zafar Bin Hubairah. She studied Kitab al-Tawhid of Ibn Khuzaymah and had sanads going back to him.

=== Personal life ===
Her husband was Nasir-al-Din Ibn Qarqin, the commissar of the Baalbek citadel. Zainab Bint ‘Umar Bin Kindi died on the 29th of Jumada Al-Aakhirah at the Baalbek citadel at the age of ninety.

=== Notable students ===
She was a teacher of al-Dhahabi (1274–1348), the Islamic historian and traditionalist, when he was in Baalbek. Dhahabi learned the beginning of the Sahih Al-Bukhari from her as well as the beginning of the book of Al-Nikaah.

She was also a teacher of Muhammad ibn Qawalij, a tutor of Ibn Hajar al-Asqalani.

== Legacy ==
Al-Dhahabi writes about her that she was "a righteous woman, generous, who possessed piety and (gave) charity. She built a hospice for the poor, and she bequeathed religious endowments." Dhahabi also says that she was "without parallel in the time (that she lived in)." He notes that his father, his maternal uncle, and many other people in Baalbek received the tradition from her ("Abul-Hussain Al-Yunini and his children and relatives, Ibn Abil-Fath and his two sons, Al-Mizzi and his elder son, Al-Birzali, Ibn-al-Nabulusi, Abu Bakr al-Rahbi, Ibn-al-Muhandis, Ahmed Ibn-al-Duraybi").
