= Ibn al-Najjar =

12th-century Islamic scholar

Imam Ibn al-Najjār
- ابن النجار
- Title: Muḥibb al-Dīn; Al-Ḥāfiẓ

Personal life
- Born: 1183 Baghdad
- Died: 1246 (aged 62–63) Baghdad
- Era: Late Abbasid era
- Region: Iraq
- Main interest(s): Hadith, History, Arabic literature
- Notable work: History of Baghdad
- Occupation: Scholar, Muhaddith, Historian, Litterateur

Religious life
- Religion: Islam
- Denomination: Sunni
- Jurisprudence: Shafi'i
- Creed: Ash'ari

Muslim leader
- Influenced by: Al-Shafi'i Abu Hasan al-Ash'ari Al-Khatib al-Baghdad Ibn Asakir Ibn 'Arabi Ibn al-Dubaythi

Abū ʿAbdallāh Muḥammad b. Maḥmūd b. al-Ḥasan b. Hibatallāh b. Maḥāsin al-Baghdādī, Muḥibb al-Dīn Ibn al-Najjār, commonly known as Ibn al-Najjār (Arabic: ابن النجار; 1183-1246 CE), was a Baghdadi Sunni Muslim scholar of the late Abbasid era. He is regarded as the leading muhaddith of his generation and, according to his contemporaries, the foremost authority in biographical history. He was the senior pupil of Ibn al-Dubaythi.

== Early life ==
=== Upbringing ===
Ibn al-Najjār was born in Baghdad in the year of 578 AH/1183 CE. Born into a modest family, he was son of the leader carpenter of the Dar al-Khilafah located in the Abbasid Palace of Baghdad. His father died when he was eight and his older brother Ali began raising him instead. Ali was a textile seller who had knowledge in calculation of inheritance, anecdotes, and history. Ibn al-Najjār studied the Hadith and the Qur'an with scholars of Baghdad.

=== Education ===
When he was twenty-eight, he travelled to the Hejaz (Mecca & Medina), the Levant, Egypt, Khurasan, Herat, and Nishapur, studying with sheikhs. Ibn al-Najjar had over 3000 teachers with 400 of his teachers being women. He was heard in every city he stayed in, and established himself as the worlds most famous memorizer.

Then he returned to Baghdad and studied history. He left for Isfahan for about a year (620 AH/1223 CE), then made the Hajj (pilgrimage) to Mecca, then moved to Egypt, then returned to Baghdad.

=== Teachers ===
His most prominent teachers include:

- Ibn al-Dubaythi
- Abu al-Faraj ‘Abd al-Mun‘im ibn Kulayb
- Yahya ibn Bawsh
- Ibn al-Jawzi
- Abu Ruh al-Harawi
- Ibn al-Shams al-Thaqafi
- Zaynab al-Shi‘riyya
- Al-Mu’ayyad al-Tusi
- Dawud ibn Mu‘ammar
- Al-Hafiz Ibn al-Mufaddal
- Abu al-Yaman Zayd ibn al-Hasan al-Kindi
- Jamal al-Din ibn al-Harstani

== Scholarly life ==
After more than twenty years of travelling, he returned to Baghdad and, following the foundation of the Al-Mustansiriya School in 630 AH (1233 AD), took up a teaching position there, where he taught hadith science. Three years later, he was appointed head of the hadith department before eventually becoming director of the madrasa. Renowned for his humility, piety, and eloquent teaching, he remained in this position until his death.

Among the many students he trained were Yaqut al-Hamawi, Ibn al-Sa'i, and Ibn al-Sha'ar, to whom he gave permission to transmit all his books and narrations.

== Death ==
He died on Tuesday, 5 Sha'ban 643 AH (1245 CE) at the age of sixty-five. His funeral was widely attended, and people proclaimed: “'This is a hafiz of the Prophet's hadith who never lied.” He left no heirs; his estate amounted to twenty dinars and his clothing, which he requested to be given in charity. He was buried in the Martyr's Cemetery at Bab Harb in Baghdad.

== Reception ==
Ibn al-Sa'i, his student, said: “He was the leading scholar of his time, reliable, and one of the finest people of the world.” In al-Durr al-Thamin, he is described as: “An imam in hadith, knowledgeable of abrogating and abrogated verses, authentic and weak narrations, and men of hadith. He had no equal in knowledge, religion, truthfulness, trustworthiness, intelligence, kindness, or sound belief.”

Yaqut al-Hamawi wrote: “Our master, al-Imam Muhibb al-Din ibn al-Najjar al-Baghdadi, the hafiz, historian, literatus, and scholar, was among the outstanding figures of his era. He travelled to the Levant, Egypt, Hijaz, Khorasan, Isfahan, Merv, Herat, and Nishapur, studying under many teachers and acquiring the principal chains of narration. His travels lasted twenty-seven years. His students numbered around three thousand. He was an imam, authoritative, trustworthy, memorizer of hadith, reciter, literatus, historian, skilled in eloquence, poetry, and had numerous works.”

== Works ==
Ibn al-Najjar was a prolific author who wrote extensively on hadith, ilm al-rijal, history, and literature:

=== History ===
- A [Useful] Extract from the continuation of the Ta'rikh Baghdad ("al-Mustafad min Dhayl Ta'rikh Baghdad"), is his magnum opus coming in 30 volumes which is an appendix to the "History of Baghdad" by Al-Khatib Al-Baghdadi.
- Nuzhat al-Wara fi Akhbar Umm al-Qura, a history compilation of Mecca.
- Al-Durra al-Thamina fi Akhbar al-Madina, a history compilation of Medina.
- Al-‘Aqd al-Fa’iq fi ‘Uyoon Akhbar al-Dunya wa-Mahasin Tawarikh al-Khala’iq
- Rawdat al-Awliya fi Masjid Ilya
- Manaqib Al-Shafi'i, a biography of Imam al-Shafi'i

=== Hadith ===
- Al-Qamar al-Munir fi al-Musnad al-Kabir, in which he mentioned the Companions and the narrators, and what each of them had from the hadith.
- Kanz al-Ayyam fi Ma‘rifat al-Sunan wa’l-Ahkam
- Al-Mukhtalif wa’l-Mu’tafiq, it is a supplement to Ibn Makula's Al-Ikmāl.
- Al-Sabiq wa’l-Lahiq
- Al-Muttafiq wa'l-Muftariq, following al-Khatib al-Baghdadi's methodology.
- Kitab al-Alqab
- Nahj al-Isabah fi Ma‘rifat al-Sahaba
- Al-Kafi fi Asma’ al-Rijal
- Nasab al-Muhaddithin ila al-Aba’ wa’l-Buldan
- ‘Awali, where he compiles Hadith with the shortest chain.
- Mu‘jam, a biographical dictionary of his teachers
- Jannat al-Nazirin fi Ma‘rifat al-Tabi‘in
- Al-Kamal fi Ma‘rifat al-Rijal

=== Literature ===
- Anwar al-Zahr fi Mahasin Shu‘ara’ al-‘Asr
- Al-Azhar fi Anwa‘ al-Ash‘ar
- Nuzhat al-Tarf fi Akhbar Ahl al-Zarf
- Ghurur al-Fawa’id (in six volumes)
- Sulwat al-Wahid
- Ikhbar al-Mushtaq bi-Akhbar al-‘Ushshaq
- Nashwar al-Muhadara
- Al-Shafi fi al-Tibb

== See also ==
- List of Ash'aris
