= Abu Tha'alba =

Abu Tha'alba (Arabic: أبو ثعلبة) was one of the companions of Muhammad and narrator of hadith, quoted in Sahih al-Bukhari, the most prominent source of Hadith among Sunni Muslims.

== See also ==
- Islam
