= Al-Kamal fi Asma' al-Rijal =

Book by ʿAbd-al-Ġanī Ibn-ʿAbd-al-Wāḥid al-Ǧammāʿīlī

- Author: Abd al-Ghani al-Maqdisi
- Language: Arabic
- Subject: biographical evaluation

Al-Kamal fi Asma' al-Rijal (Arabic: الكمال في أسماء الرجال) is a collection of biographies of hadith narrators within the Islamic discipline of biographical evaluation by the 12th-century Islamic scholar Abd al-Ghani al-Maqdisi.

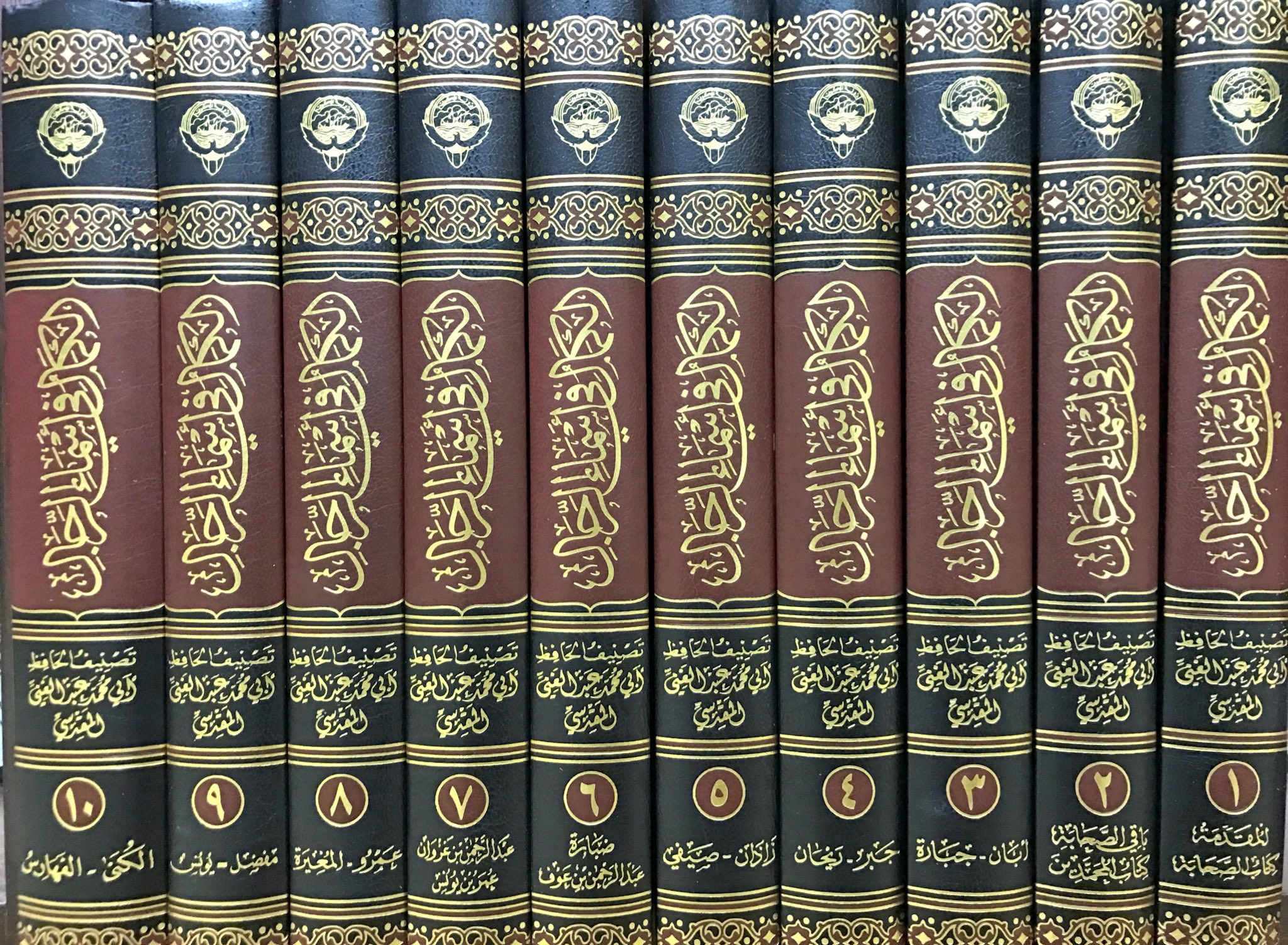
Al-Kamal fi Asma' Ar-Rijal in 10 volumes

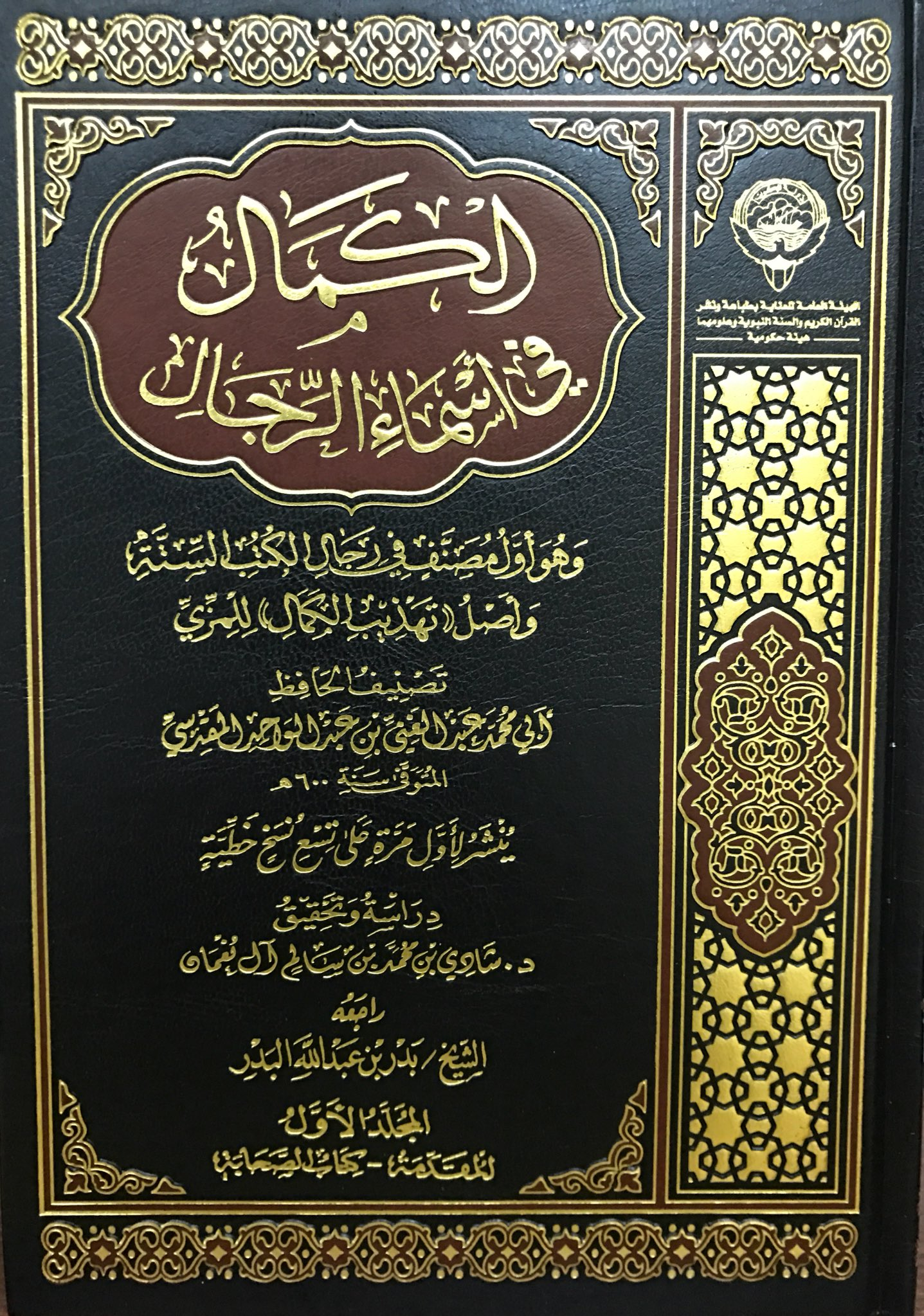
Al-Kamal fi Asma' Ar-Rijal book cover

== Overview ==
The author collected in this book the names and biographies of all, or most, of the hadith narrators mentioned in the six canonical hadith collections. These six books are Sahih al-Bukhari and Sahih Muslim and the four Sunan books by Al-Nasa'i, al-Tirmidhi, Abu Dawood and Ibn Majah. The biographies relate to the standing of each narrator relating to his narrating ability which is referred to in Arabic as `Ilm al-Rijāl.

The book is not currently published and exists in manuscript form in the Al-Zahiriyah Library in Damascus, Syria. The author ordered his work by mentioning the Companions first, beginning with the ten promised paradise, and then moving on to the Followers, beginning with those named Muhammad and so on. The four-volume collection is in the manuscript form.

== Books derived from al-Kamal ==
- Yusuf ibn Abd al-Rahman al-Mizzi compiled, edited and abridged this work naming it Tahdhib Al-Kamal fi Asma' Al-rijal. According to the numbering system of the editor of the published edition, Dr. Bashar 'Awwad Ma'roof, it contains the biographies of 8,640 narrators of hadith, including Companions. It has recently been published in both eight volumes and 35 by Mu'assasah al-Risalah in Beirut, Lebanon; the first edition was 1998. The names of the biography subjects are arranged in alphabetical order in contrast to the original work.
- Further, one of al-Mizzi's gifted pupils, Al-Dhahabi, summarised his teacher's work and produced two abridgements: a longer one called Tadhhib al-Tahdhib and a shorter one called Al-Kashif fi Asma' Rijal al-Kutub al-Sittah.
- A similar effort to the work of al-Mizzi was made by Ibn Hajar, who prepared a lengthy but abridged version, with about one-third of the original omitted, entitled Tahdhib al-Tahdhib It is currently published in numerous editions, most notably in India in twelve volumes. Later, he abridged this further in a brief work entitled Taqrib al-Tahdhib mentioning only basic biographical information, such as name, era, date of death and the author's conclusion regarding that narrator's standing as a narrator.
- The work of al-Mizzi was again serviced by Safi al-Din Ahmad b. 'Abdullah al-Khazraji (d. after 923) who abridged al-Dhahabi's work, Tadhhib al-Tahdhib, making valuable additions, producing his Khulasah al-Tathhib.

== See also ==
- Al-Majdi fi Ansab al-Talibiyyin
- Usd al-ghabah fi marifat al-Saḥabah
