= The Complete History =

13th-century Islamic history book

- Author: Ali ibn al-Athir
- Original title: الكامل في التاريخ
- Language: Arabic
- Subject: Islamic history
- Genre: Historical chronicle
- Published: 1231 AD / 628 AH
- Publication place: Abbasid Caliphate
- Media type: Manuscript

The Complete History (Arabic: الكامل في التاريخ, al-Kāmil fit-Tārīkh), is a classic Islamic history book written by Ali ibn al-Athir. Composed in ca. 1231AD/628AH, it is one of the most important Islamic historical works. Ibn al-Athir was a contemporary and member of the retinue of Saladin, the Sultan of Egypt who captured Jerusalem from the Crusaders and massively reduced European holdings in the Levant, leaving the Principality of Antioch and County of Tripoli much reduced and only a few cities on the coast to the Kingdom of Jerusalem.

== Format of The Complete History ==
The Complete History is organised into several volumes, years, and subsections. Each volume is divided in chronological order into years. For instance, the year 491 AH starts "then the year one and ninety and four hundred began." Each year has several sections committed to major events, which are not necessarily in chronological order. These subsections may include the deaths, births, and dynastic succession of major states like the Seljuk Empire. Subsections also include major political events, the appearance of groups such as the Franks or the Tatars (Mongols), and major battles like the Siege of Jerusalem of 1099.

== The Rus ==
Ibn Athir's depiction of the Rūs is not primarily ethnological, and not dealing with particular customs or detailed geography. Rather, he accounts for the military significance of the Rūs as a people who raided the Caspian region and, importantly, who served the Byzantine Empire as mercenaries. Several references to the Rūs in the Kāmil are connected with Byzantine military operations. The strategic significance of the Varangians was recognized by the Arabs as early as the time of al-Muqaddasī (ca. 945–1000), who had described the Rūs as "two kinds of Byzantines" (jinsān min ar-Rūmī).

The first reference in the Kāmil to the Rūs are two entries for the year 943 referring to a raid of the Rūs in the Caucasus. The second entry concerns Rūs participation in the battle of Manzikert of 1071.

== The Crusades ==
A large portion of the history deals with the era of the Crusades; this portion has been translated by D. S. Richards in three volumes, dealing with the arrival of the crusaders up to the time of Imad ad-Din Zengi, Nur ad-Din, and Saladin. In fact, ibn al-Athir's portrayal of the advent of the crusades is especially informative of the Muslim perspective of the beginning of the Crusades.

Ibn al-Athir characterizes the advent of the crusades as an issue of political intrigue and its historical importance in terms of Frankish conquest, as merely one event within a continuous pattern. He attributes the origin to the happenings of 1085-86, when the Franks first invaded Islamic lands in Andalusia, and connects the crusades with the conquest of Sicily in 1091.

Ibn al-Athir attributes the political intrigue behind the immediate origins of the crusade to three sources: Roger I, the Fatimids, and the Byzantine Emperor. According to al-Athir, Roger I manipulated the invasion of Syria and march onto Jerusalem by the crusading armies under Baldwin—a compounding of various "Baldwins" of Flanders and Jerusalem. In his account Roger I is said to have "raised one leg and farted loudly" to dismiss the comments of his companions regarding Baldwin's requests to use Sicily as the intermediate station before advancing to conquer Africa. Whatever the plausibility of this account, perhaps ibn al-Athir is indulging in some creative editorial, as even medieval Islamic writers were wont at times to lampoon ones enemy. In Ibn al-Athir's description Roger redirects the Frankish armies under Baldwin to head toward Syria and Jerusalem, instead of North Africa through Sicily, in order to preserve his "annual profit from the harvest," thus demonstrating Roger's political acumen and calculus motivating his decision to launch the first crusade from Antioch. In this case, it is unsurprising that ibn al-Athir characterizes the beginning of the crusades to have occurred with the siege of Antioch in 1097, as the crusades were simply part of a long historical pattern of Frankish conquests and not conceptualized as a distinct event, as contemporary European chroniclers—such as Fulcher of Chartres—tended to do. In addition, Ibn al-Athir refers to Roger's concern with maintaining friendly relations with Muslim rulers in Africa as another reason why he redirected the Frankish armies to Syria.

The second source of political intrigue that ibn al-Athir claimed to have shaped the beginnings of the First Crusade was the Shiite Fatimid Dynasty in Egypt. While Ibn al-Athir claims that it is merely "another story," he suggests fairly clearly that the Fatimids had a role in instigating the Franks to invade Syria because they were threatened by the expansion of Seljuk power and wanted to use the Franks to protect Fatimid Egypt from a Seljuk invasion. ibn al-Athir seems to suggest that the Fatimids were not "Muslims," demonstrating how Seljuk Sunni Muslims viewed the "heretic[al]" practices of the non-Sunni Fatimids.

A third source of political intrigue to which Ibn al-Athir attributes influence over the development of the origins of the crusade is the Byzantine Emperor. Ibn al-Athir describes how the Byzantine Emperor had coerced the Franks to agree to conquer Antioch for him in exchange for permission to pass through Byzantine lands to the Levant. Ibn al-Athir describes how the Byzantine Emperor's "real intention was to incite [the crusaders] to attack the Muslims, for he was convinced that the Turks, whose invincible control over Asia Minor he had observed, would exterminate every one of them." Again, Ibn al-Athir attributes the advent of the First Crusade as a product of the Frankish armies being manipulated by political actors to do their bidding.

In terms of the beginning of the First Crusade, ibn al-Athir describes the siege of Antioch in July 1097 as the starting point. Within his description, Ibn al-Athir discusses how the ruler of Antioch, Yaghi Siyan, expelled the Christians inhabitants of Antioch for fear of internal insurrection. Ibn al-Athir writes of the expulsion as an act of "protection", in which Yaghi Siyan was trying to protect the families of the Christians in Antioch, despite the obvious situation that he was holding these families hostage in an attempt to dissuade Antioch Christians from joining the Crusading armies. Moreover, Ibn al-Athir attributes the fall of Antioch to treachery by an Antioch cuirass-maker who let in the crusaders through the water gate, and to Yaghi Siyan escaping in panic. Even so, Ibn al-Athir's accounts were still fairly partial, as he seems to suggest that Yaghi Siyan's escape was out of panic, instead of cowardice; he describes Yaghi Siyan to have suffered from great grief and repentance after his flight. Furthermore, Ibn al-Athir describes further acts of Frankish deviousness, in that they had sent messages to the rulers of Aleppo and Damascus "to say that they had no interest in any cities but those that had once belonged to Byzantium" in an attempt to "dissuade these rulers from" coming "to the help of Antioch."

Further on, Ibn al-Athir describes the failed Muslim siege of Antioch that ended in defeat. One event that Ibn al-Athir describes during this failed siege was the finding of the Holy Lance by Peter Bartholomew, but framed in the context of Peter Bartholomew having buried a lance in a certain spot prior to such "discovery." Regarding the siege, Ibn al-Athir attributes the failure to Qawam ad-Daula Kerbuqa, who led the Muslim charge and failed for treating the Muslims "with such contempt and scorn" and prevented the Muslims from killing the Franks when given the opportunity. Ibn al-Athir's description of the siege ended in the overwhelming victory of Frankish armies against the Muslims. This was but the first step to the conquest of Jerusalem by the crusaders in 1099.

== Editions ==
- al-Kāmil fīʾl-Tārīkh, ed. Abū l-Fidāʾ ʿAbdallāh al-Qāḍī (11 vols., Beirut: Dār al-kutub al-ʿilmiyya, 1987–2003)
- كامل : تاريخ بزرگ اسلام و ايران (Kāmil: Tārīkh-e bozorg-e Eslām va Īrān), ed. Ḥasan Sādāt Nāṣerī (fa), tr. ʿAbbās Khalīlī, rev. Mahyār Khalīlī (27 vols., Tehran: ʿElmī, 1965–1968)
- al-Kāmil fīʾl-Tārīkh (12 vols., Cairo: al-Kubra al-ʻĀmirah, 1873/4; reprinted (?), 12 vols., Cairo: Muḥammad Muṣṭafa, 1885)
- Ibn-el-Athiri Chronicon quod perfectissimum inscribitur, ed. Carl Johan Tornberg (sv) (14 vols., Leiden: Brill, 1867–1876; reprinted with revised notes, Beirut: Dar al-Sādir, 1965–1967)

== Translations (partial) ==
- The Chronicle of Ibn al-Athīr for the Crusading Period from al-Kāmil fīʾl-Taʾrīkh, tr. Donald Sidney Richards (3 vols., Aldershot: Ashgate, 2006–2008; reprinted, London: Routledge, 2016) [for the years 1097–1231]
- The Annals of the Saljuq Turks: Selections from al-Kāmil fīʾl-Taʾrīkh of ʿIzz al-Dīn Ibn al-Athīr, tr. Donald Sidney Richards (London: Routledge, 2002) [for the years 1029–1097]
- El-Kamil fî t-Tarîx. Kurd di tarîxa Ibn el-Esîr de, ed. Emîn Narozî (2 vols., Istanbul: Avesta, 2018) [for excerpts on Kurdish history]
- اخبار ایران از الکامل ابن اثیر (Akhbār-e Īrān az al-Kāmil-e Ebn As̲īr), tr. Mohammad Ebrahim Bastani Parizi (Tehran: Dāneshgāh-e Tehrān, 1970; 2nd edn., Tehran: Donyā-ye Ketāb, 1986) [for excerpts on Iran]
- Arabakan Aghpyurner, tr. with notes Aram Ter-Ghevondyan (Yerevan: Academy of Sciences of the Armenian Soviet Socialist Republic, 1981) [for excerpts on Armenia]
- Материалы по истории Азербайджана из Тарих-ал-Камиль Ибн-ал-Асира (полного свода истории), tr. Pantelejmon K. Žuze (ru) (Baku: Azerbaijani Affiliate of the Academy of Sciences of the USSR, 1940) [for excerpts on Azerbaijan]
- Annales du Maghreb et de l'Espagne, tr. Edmond Fagnan (Alger: Adolphe Jourdan, 1898; reprinted, Alger: Grand Alger Livres, 2007) [for excerpts on Maghreb and al-Andalus between the years 642–1207]
- Ibn-el-Athirs Chrönika. Elfte delen, tr. Carl Johan Tornberg (2 vols., Lund: Berlingska boktryckeriet (sv), 1851–1853): vol. I, vol. II

== See also ==
- List of Sunni books
- History of Damascus
- History of Baghdad
- History of Nishapur
