= Al-Sam'ani =

Al-Sam'ani is a surname. Notable people with the surname include:

- Aḥmad Samʿānī (died 1140), Arab theologian who wrote in Persian
- Ibn al-Sam'ani (died 1166), his nephew, biographer who wrote in Arabic
