= Ibn al-Dubaythi =

(1163-1239) Islamic scholar

Ibn al-Dubaythī
- Title: Jamal al-Din; Al-Ḥāfiẓ

Personal life
- Born: (558 AH/1163 AD) Wasit
- Died: (637 AH/1239 AD) Baghdad
- Era: Late Abbasid era
- Region: Iraq
- Main interest(s): Hadith, History
- Notable work: History of Baghdad
- Occupation: Muhaddith, Scholar, Historian

Religious life
- Religion: Islam
- Denomination: Sunni
- Jurisprudence: Shafi'i
- Creed: Ash'ari

Muslim leader
- Influenced by: Al-Shafi'i Al-Khatib al-Baghdadi Ibn Asakir Ibn 'Arabi Ibn al-Sam'ani
- Influenced: Ibn al-Najjar

Jamāl al-Dīn Abū ʿAbdallāh Muḥammad b. Saʿīd b. Yaḥyā b. ʿAlī b. al-Ḥajjāj al-Wāsiṭī (Arabic: ابن الدبيثي), commonly known as Ibn al-Dubaythī, was an Iraqi muhaddith (hadith scholar), historian and an expert in ilm al-rijal who composed, among other major works. He was one of the major historians of the late Abbasid era, and considered one of the best scholars of his time in hadith and its sciences.

== Biography ==
He was born in Wasit on Monday, 26 Radjab 558/Sunday, 30 June 1163. His early education took place in his hometown Wasit where he studied the Qu'ran, hadith, and literature. He then migrated and settled into Baghdad and narrated hadiths from hundreds of sheikhs. It was there he studied Shafi'i jurisprudence, hadith sciences, Qur'anic recitations, adab, Arabic sciences and other religious sciences under on a number of scholars in Baghdad, and he wanted to increase his attainment and seek knowledge, so he left and performed Hajj in the year in 579/1183–4, and he consulted and sought knowledge from the scholars of hejaz, and travelled to Egypt to gain more knowledge. He died in Baghdad on Monday, 8 Rabi II 637/7 November 1239.

== Works ==
=== Continuation of the History of Baghdad ===
This manuscript is meant to be the continuity or a dhayl of the lost work of Ibn al-Sam'ani who himself had continued the work of Al-Baghdadi author of Ta'rikh Baghdad. Ibn al-Dubaythi's job was to add the names of the dead preceptors after Al-Sam'ani. He listed the Baghdadis among them were the caliphs and the rulers of their covenants, ministers, lords of states, jurists, captains, judges, justices, preachers, jurists, hadith narrators, readers, people of virtue and literature, poets, Sufis, doctors, pharmacists, and others, and some of the characters quoted in Ibn Al-Dubaythi's work were preceptors whom he knew personally and wrote about his scholarly life, studies, travels, elders, and part of his relationships.

On his death in 1239 it was his famous pupil Ibn-al-Najjār who continued his work and expanded on it entitled "A [Useful] Extract from the continuation of the Ta'rikh Baghdad" (al-Mustafad min Dhayl Ta'rikh Baghdad).

=== History of Wasit ===
Ibn al-Dubaythi also wrote a history of Wasit, which was one of the most important scientific centers in which literature and science markets circulated. Historians described it as a “great history”, in which he presented accurate information about the cultural and intellectual aspects of Wasit, its scholars, and some of its schools and teachers, and it contains valuable information of a number of Men of Wasit, readers, speakers, jurists and writers, and about the scientific connections between it and the Islamic world, and the most famous scientific houses, and it included useful information about the science of hadith, and its presentation was distinguished by accuracy and comprehensiveness, given that he was from the city, and he lived with many of its sheikhs and scholars, and relied on historical books of Wasit scholars. His History of Wasit have not been preserved.

== Bibliography ==
- Rosenthal, F (2012). "Ibn al-Dubaythī". Ibn al-Dubayt̲h̲ī", in: Encyclopaedia of Islam, Second Edition. doi:10.1163/1573-3912_islam_SIM_3148. ISBN 9789004335714.
- Van Renterghem, Vanessa (2017). "Ibn al-Dubaythī". Ibn al-Dubaythī", in: Encyclopaedia of Islam, THREE. doi:10.1163/1573-3912_ei3_COM_30116. ISBN 9789004335714.
- Caesar, Farah (1968). "An Unedited Autographed Manuscript of ibn-al-Dubaythi, al-ta'rīkh al-mudhayyil, in Princeton University Library". Journal of the American Oriental Society. 88 (2): 334–340. doi:10.2307/597207. JSTOR 597207.
- Farah, Caesar E. (July 1970). "The Dhayl in Medieval Arabic Historiography. An Essay of the American Oriental Society, No. 6 (New Haven, Connecticut, 1967)". International Journal of Middle East Studies. 1: 278–278. doi:10.1017/S0020743800024223.
