= Muhammad ibn Nasr ibn al-Qaysarani =

Abū ʿAbdallāh Muḥammad ibn Naṣr (Note: His full name is Abū ʿAbdallāh Muḥammad ibn Naṣr ibn Ṣaghīr ibn Dāghir ibn Muḥammad ibn Khālid. Abū ʿAbdallāh is a kunya indicating his son's name was ʿAbdallāh, while ibn means "son of". His nisab are al-ʿAkkāwī and al-Ḥalabī, indicating a connection, respectively, with Acre and Aleppo. He also bore several alqāb (honorifics): Sharaf al-Dīn, "honour of the faith"; Shaykh, "elder"; Muhadhdhab al-Dīn, "upright of the faith"; and ʿUddat al-Dīn, "preparedness of the faith".) (1085–1154), known as al-Qaysarānī (Note: This is a nisba indicating a connection to Caesarea Maritima. It may also be transliterated al-Ḳaysarānī. Ibn al-Samʿānī, in his biographical dictionary, calls him al-Qaysārī.) or Ibn al-Qaysarānī, was a Syrian Muslim poet who wrote in Arabic under the Zangid dynasty. He had a broad and scientific education, which included a sojourn in Iraq. He was one of the most renowned poets of his age, (Note: Hermes 2017, p. 268, cites the assessment of several medieval Muslim scholars: Ibn al-Qalānisī: "He was an outstanding adīb and poet."; ʿImād al-Dīn al-Iṣfahānī: "[He] and Ibn Munīr were the Jarīr and al-Farazdaq of the time. They were the sunrise and sunset of poetry and their fame has spread across [Syria]."; al-Yāfiʿī: "He was one of the greatest poets and most skilled men of letters."; al-Nuʿaymī: "He was the bearer of the flag of poetry of his time.") and the most prolific Zangid propagandist. He wrote extensively against the Crusades for his masters. (Note: Hermes 2017, p. 272: "The Franks inspired Ibn al-Qaysarānī like no other poet in the Arabic poetic tradition, both in his invective against them and encouragement of his own side to defeat them".)

== Life ==
Ibn al-Qaysarānī was born in AD 1085 (AH 478) in Acre in Palestine, then part of the Seljuk Empire. He sometimes bears the tribal nisba al-Makhzūmī, which would make him a relative of Khālid ibn al-Walīd al-Makhzūmī, one of the earliest Muslim commanders, but medieval chroniclers generally reject this relationship. When the Fatimid Caliphate began advancing into Palestine, his father, Naṣr ibn Ṣaghīr, moved the family to Caesarea Maritima. There, according to the chronicles, he was educated in Islamic tradition and the Arabic language. The evidence of his poetry and career suggests that he also studied arithmetic, astrology, astronomy, geometry and horology.

In 1101 or 1102, his family fled Caesarea for Damascus following an attack by King Baldwin I of Jerusalem. In Damascus, he became for a time superintendent of mechanical clocks. He oversaw the clock of the Umayyad Mosque. He received an ijāza (authorization) from the famous poet Ibn al-Khayyāṭ to transmit the latter's dīwān (poetry collection). It was through Ibn al-Khayyāt that Ibn al-Qaysarānī was introduced to the Damascene elite. He became the teacher of Ibn ʿAsākir.

Ibn al-Qaysarānī left Damascus on a riḥla (journey in search of knowledge) to Baghdad. He spent some time in al-Anbār. He did not have success in Baghdad and returned to Damascus shortly before the death of his old patron, Tāj al-Mulūk Būrī, in 1132. According to Sibṭ ibn al-Jawzī, he wrote a hijāʾ (invective) against Būrī's successor, Shams al-Mulūk Ismāʿīl. He then fled Damascus for Aleppo. There he met with great success under the patronage of the atabegs. He was appointed head librarian of the Khizānat al-kutub, Aleppo's main library. He joined the circle around Abū Ṭāhir al-Ḥalabī, the scholar and khaṭīb of Aleppo. He was invited back to Damascus by the Emir Mujīr al-Dīn. He died ten days after his return in 1154 (548).

== Poetry ==
As a poet, Ibn al-Qaysarānī is most famous for his panegyrics for ʿImād al-Dīn Zangī and Nūr al-Dīn ibn Zangī and his love poems for people from around Antioch. He also composed panegyrics for previous governors of Damascus: Shams al-Mulūk Duqāq, Ṭughtikīn and Tāj al-Mulūk Būrī. Abū Ṭāhir also received one. In one panegyric, he praises Būrī for the defence of Damascus against the Franks in 1129. In two rhyming poems, he commemorates Zangī's victories at the Battle of Baʾrin (1135) and the Siege of Edessa (1144).

Ibn al-Qaysarānī had a famous rivalry with Ibn Munīr al-Ṭarābulusī. According to Abū Shāma, "during [the] reign [of Nūr al-Dīn], the two masters of poetry of the times were Ibn al-Qaysarānī and Ibn Munīr." Ibn Khallikān, who praised him as "one of the greatest poets and outstanding udabāʾ [litterateurs]" of Syria, reports that he saw an autograph copy of Ibn al-Qaysarānī's dīwān in Aleppo. Only one poorly preserved copy of this collection of poems survives, kept in Cairo. Some of his qaṣīdas are quoted by Abū Shāma in his Kitād al-Rawḍatayn. In his early years, he wrote satire before finding his gift in panegyric. Among his poetic influences was Abū Tammām.

Besides poetry, Ibn al-Qaysarānī wrote a small biographical dictionary, Kitāb al-Ansāb, quoted by Yāqūt al-Rūmī and probably used by Ibn al-Samʿānī. Yāqūt refers to him as "a majestic poet and an outstanding adīb," while Ibn al-Samʿānī considered him "the most talented poet in" Syria. While in al-Anbār, he wrote in praise of Baghdad and with homesickness for Damascus, two well-used tropes of shiʿr al-mudun (city poetry):

In Anbār, I resided with a burning desire
divided between two lovers.
I yearn for my family in Damascus,
and in Baghdad, the share of the heart and the eye.
For in reuniting with the one, there is departing from the other.
tell me: when shall I be rid of this separation.

== Bibliography ==
- Bauer, Thomas (2017). "Ibn al-Qaysarānī, Abū ʿAbdallāh". In Fleet, Kate; Krämer, Gudrun; Matringe, Denis; Nawas, John; Rowson, Everett (eds.). Encyclopaedia of Islam (3rd ed.). Brill Online. ISSN 1873-9830.
- Christie, Niall (2014). "Ibn al-Qalānisī". In Alex Mallett (ed.). Medieval Muslim Historians and the Franks in the Levant. Brill. pp. 7–28. doi:10.1163/9789004280687. ISBN 9789004280687.
- Hermes, Nizar F. (2017). "The Poet(ry) of Frankish Enchantment: The Ifranjiyyāt of Ibn Qaysarānī". Middle Eastern Literatures. 20 (3): 267–287. doi:10.1080/1475262x.2017.1385695. S2CID 166119010.
- Hillenbrand, Carole (2000). The Crusades: Islamic Perspectives. Routledge.
- Ng, Jeson (2019). "Women of the Crusades: The Constructedness of the Female Other, 1100–1200". Al-Masāq: Journal of the Medieval Mediterranean. 31 (3): 303–322. doi:10.1080/09503110.2019.1584453. S2CID 166866145.
- Schacht, J. (1971). "Ibn al-Ḳaysarānī". In Lewis, B.; Ménage, V. L.; Pellat, Ch. & Schacht, J. (eds.). The Encyclopaedia of Islam, Second Edition. Volume III: H–Iram. Leiden: E. J. Brill. p. 821. OCLC 495469525.
- Sellheim, R. (1995). "al-Samʿānī, Abū Saʿd". In Bosworth, C. E.; van Donzel, E.; Heinrichs, W. P. & Lecomte, G. (eds.). The Encyclopaedia of Islam, Second Edition. Volume VIII: Ned–Sam. Leiden: E. J. Brill. pp. 1024–1025. ISBN 978-90-04-09834-3.
