= Abd Allah ibn Abi Awfa =

Sahabah of Muhammad

Abd Allah ibn Abi Awfa (Arabic: عبد الله بن أبي أوفى) was one of the companions of Muhammad and narrator of hadith.

1) Narrated 'Abd Allah bin Abi Awfa:

A man displayed some goods in the market and took a false oath that he had been offered so much for them though he was not offered that amount Then the following Divine Verse was revealed:-- "Verily! Those who purchase a little gain at the cost of Allah's covenant and their oaths . . . Will get painful punishment." (3.77) Ibn Abi Awfa added, "Such person as described above is a treacherous Riba-eater (i.e. eater of usury).

2) Abd Allah bin Abi Awfa:

"The Prophet used to say: 'Allahumma tahhirni bith-thalji wal-barad wal-ma' al-barid, Allahumma tahhirni min adh-dhunub kama yutahhar ath-thawb al-abyad min ad-danas (O Allah, purify me with snow and hail and cold water, O Allah, purify me of sin as a white garment is cleansed of dirt)."

(Sunan an-Nasa'i, Book 4, Hadith 8)

== See also ==
- Islam
