= Bibi Heravi =

Persian poet (997 - 1084)

- بی‌بی هروی
- Born: 997; Herat, Khorasan,
- Died: 1084
- Occupation: Hadith

Bibi Heravi (Persian: بی‌بی هروی) known as Bibi Harthami and nicknamed Umm al-Fazl (997 – 1084) (ancestry: Bibi bint Abdul Samad bin Ali Heravi) was a Khorasani Hadith studies lady in the 5th century Hijri. It has a famous name and it has been mentioned by various narrators and it is in hand today. Shams al-Din Dhahabi has written about her famous role in Tarikh al-Kabir.
