= Nur al-Din Ali ibn Da'ud al-Jawhari al-Sayrafi =

15th-century Egyptian author

Nūr al-Dīn 'Alī ibn Dā'ūd al-Jawharī al-Sayrafī, whose name is variously shortened to al-Jawhari or al-Sayrafi, was a 15th-century Egyptian author and copyist who lived from 1416 to about 1495. He came from a modest background - his father was a money changer in the Mamluk bureaucracy. He was a student of Ibn Hajar al-Asqalani, who encouraged him to take up writing. Ali's works are the earliest examples of the late-15th-century "Cairo narrative style", which combined formal styles with colloquialisms. However, he was never successful as a writer and turned to manuscript copying in order to earn a living; he also worked as a money changer like his father in Cairo's jewellery market (hence the epithet "al-Jawhari"). He made and sold copies of al-Asqalani's works, with his own commentaries included as appendices. Ali wanted to be appointed to a senior position as a Hanafi judge, but the closest he ever got was a deputy judgeship with few responsibilities. This happened when he was 50 (so, about 1466) and was gotten "at a colleague's behest". The only source for Ali's biographical information is a "vitriolic" obituary by al-Sakhawi. Al-Sakhawi dismissed Ali's colloquial writing style as "unsophisticated" and remarked that "nothing but his personal appearance distinguished him from the populace"; he considered Ali's commentary on al-Asqalani "a blight on the great sage's treatises".

Ali's own output as an author consisted of two works on history. The first, Nuzhat al-Nufūs wa'l-Abdān fī Tawārīkh al-Zamān ("A Diversion Spiritual and Corporeal in the Annals of Time"), was an account of Egyptian politics from 1384 (786 AH) to 1475 (879 AH). None of this work is original material, and it is entirely copied, rewritten, and synthesized from al-Maqrizi's Kitāb al-Sulūk and Ibn al-Furat's Tārīkh al-Duwal (although he only explicitly cites the former as a source). He does introduce some new details to some episodes which are not found in his sources - for example, adding that prisoners being beaten with clubs were stripped naked first, or adding that exiles were accompanied by an escort. These may simply be cases of artistic license, or they may be Ali's inferences based on what was typical practice at the time (i.e. maybe it was normal for prisoners to be stripped naked before beatings, or for exiles to be accompanied by an escort, even if Ali's sources never explicitly mentioned this).

The second work, Inbā' al-Haṣr fī Abnā' al-'Aṣr ("Informing the Lion about Scions of the Age"), was a panegyric chronicle of the reign of Qaitbay. Ali apparently intended to present this work to the sultan as a gift and thus find favor at court, but it's unknown if he ever finished it because only fragments survive. The surviving part is extremely detailed and covers the years 873-877 AH (1468-1473 CE), with parts from 885-86 AH (1480-81 CE) attached.
