= Ibn al-Sam'ani =

12th-century Islamic scholar

- إبن السمعاني
- Title: Al-Ḥāfiẓ

Personal life
- Born: (506 AH/1113 AD) Merv
- Died: (562 AH/1166 AD) Merv
- Era: Islamic golden age
- Main interest(s): Fiqh, Hadith, History, Tafsir
- Notable work(s): Kitāb al-Ansāb, History of Baghdad
- Occupation: Muhaddith, Scholar, Muslim Jurist, Historian, Biographer

Religious life
- Religion: Islam
- Denomination: Sunni
- Jurisprudence: Shafi'i
- Creed: Ash'ari

Muslim leader
- Influenced by: Al-Shafi'i Abu Hasan al-Ash'ari Al-Khatib al-Baghdadi Aḥmad Samʿānī Ibn Asakir
- Influenced: Ibn al-Athir Ibn al-Dubaythi

Ibn al-Samʿānī (Arabic: إبن السمعاني, 1113–1166), full name Abū Saʿd ʿAbd al-Karīm ibn Abī Bakr Muḥammad ibn Abi ʾl-Muẓaffar Manṣūr al-Tamīmī al-Marwazī al-Shafiʿī al-Samʿānī, (Note: The kunya Abū Saʿd is sometimes incorrectly spelled Abū Saʿīd. Manṣūr may be given the definite article, al-Manṣūr. The nisab al-Tamīmī, al-Marwazī, al-Shafiʿī and al-Samʿānī indicate, respectively, tribal affiliation, hometown, madhhab and branch of the family.) nicknamed Tāj al-Islām (Crown of Islam) (Note: Sometimes given as Tāj al-Dīn.) and Qiwām al-Dīn (Support of the Faith), was an Arab Muslim scholar of biography, history, hadith, Shafi'i jurisprudence and scriptural exegesis. According to Ibn al-Subki, Ibn al-Sam'ani was considered the second greatest hadith scholar of his time after his companion and master, Ibn Asakir.

A native of Merv in central Asia, al-Samʿānī's formal education began at the age of two under the tutelage first of his father and then of his uncles. He travelled widely throughout his life in search of learning. He composed over 50 works, but many are lost. His magnum opus is the Kitāb al-Ansāb, a vast biographical dictionary of scholars with over 10,000 entries.

== Life ==
A long but incomplete genealogy of ʿAbd al-Karīm al-Samʿānī is known. He belonged to the Samʿān (Note: or Simʿān) branch of the Arab tribe of Tamīm. He was born in Merv on 10 February 1113. His grandfather, Abu ʾl-Muẓaffar Manṣūr (died 1096), had switched from the Ḥanafī to the Shāfiʿī school of law, and his father, Abū Bakr Muḥammad (born 1074), was an authority on Shāfiʿiyya, ḥadīth and preaching, who took the two-year-old ʿAbd al-Karīm with him to lectures on ḥadīth. In 1115, the young ʿAbd al-Karīm accompanied his father and elder brother to Nīshāpūr for further training in ḥadīth. His father died shortly after returning to Merv in 1116, and entrusted his son to his two brothers.

Under his uncles' guidance, ʿAbd al-Karīm studied adab (etiquette), ʿarabiyya (Arabic language and literature), fiqh (jurisprudence) and the Qurʾān. He began his formal ṭalab al-ʿilm (search for knowledge) (Note: i.e., the path to receiving ijāza, authorization to teach) when he was not yet twenty years old. Accompanied by his uncle Aḥmad al-Samʿānī, he went to Nīshāpūr to study the Ṣaḥīḥ of Muslim ibn al-Ḥajjāj. He also studied in Ṭūs.

Although he made his permanent residence in Merv, where he also taught, Ibn al-Samʿānī travelled extensively as part of his personal ṭalab al-ʿilm. He twice performed the Ḥajj, the pilgrimage to Mecca. His travels kept him away from Merv for three long periods: 1135–1143, 1145–1151 and 1154–1157. On his last trip, he was accompanied by his son, ʿAbd al-Raḥīm (1143–1220). Besides Mecca, he visited Medina, Damascus, Iṣfahān, Hamadān, Khwārazm, Samarqand, Bukhārā, Balkh and Herāt, always stopping at the schools. He even visited Jerusalem, which at the time was under Christian rule.

Ibn al-Samʿānī died in Merv on 26 December 1166.

== Works ==
Ibn al-Samʿānī wrote over 50 works. Many of them are lost, presumably victims of the Mongol sack of Merv in 1221. Some of his works are excerpted by Yāqūt al-Rūmī, who knew ʿAbd al-Raḥīm and had access to the family library.

Ibn al-Samʿānī wrote at least three biographical dictionaries:

- Kitāb al-Ansāb contains 5,348 entries in alphabetical order by nisba. Each entry gives the pronunciation and meaning of the nisba, followed by the scholar's full name, then his teachers, disciples, places of activity and date of death. Other notable persons with the same nisba will be grouped under the same heading. Thus, the total number of biographies is two or three times greater than the number of entries. He sometimes quotes his sources. He made use of the smaller Kitāb al-Ansāb of Ibn al Qaysarānī. Although he produced a finished version a few years before his death, he continued to add to it until his death. An abridgement, al-Lubāb fī tahdhīb al-Ansāb, was produced by Ibn al-Athīr, which in turn was further abbreviated and supplemented by al-Suyūṭī in his Lubb al-Lubāb fī taḥrīr al-Ansāb.

The Ansāb covers scholars from eastern Islamic lands from all schools of fiqh. In that respect it has been compared to the earlier works of Abū Isḥāq al-Shīrāzī and ʿAbd al-Wahhāb al-Fārisī as "a work of conciliation" at a time "of increasing inter-school rivalries", in the words of Chase Robinson. Many Muslim scholars offered praise of al-Samʿānī for the Ansāb: Ibn ʿAsākir, Ibn al-Athīr, Ibn Khallikān, al-Dhahabī, al-Ṣafadī, Ibn Nāṣir al-Dīn and Ibn al-ʿImād. The work was more critically received by his contemporary Ibn al-Jawzī, whose critique was reproduced in Ibn Kathīr's short biography of al-Samʿānī.

- al-Taḥbīr fi ʾl-Muʿjām al-kabīr contains over 1,200 entries of persons whom Ibn al-Samʿānī either met (mainly in Nīshāpūr or Iṣfahān), corresponded with or received an ijāza (authorization to teach) from. He is said to have completed this work in the year before his death. The only surviving manuscript is missing a beginning and end, perhaps an indication that he died before completing it. There is some debate over whether this manuscript is the full work or an abridgement.
- Muntakhab Muʿjām al-shuyūkh contains biographical entries for all of Ibn al-Samʿānī's teachers. The sole surviving manuscript was copied in 1250. It may be an excerpt from the unabridged al-Taḥbīr.

Ibn al-Samʿānī also wrote on history and customs:

- A dhayl (continuation) of the Taʾrīkh Baghdād of al-Khaṭīb al-Baghdādī is known only from quotations and excerpts.
- Adab al-imlāʾ wa ʾl-istimlāʾ is a treatise on dictation as a method of transmitting texts and knowledge. It is known only from a manuscript copied in Merv in 1152 (during al-Samʿānī's lifetime).
- Adab al-qāḍī, a book on judges, survives in three manuscripts.
- Faḍāʾil al-Shaʾm (Virtues of Syria) is known from a manuscript from Cairo.

Several of Ibn al-Samʿānī's lost works are known by title. In his Adab al-imlāʾ wa ʾl-istimlāʾ, he mentions a fuller work on the subject, Ṭirāz al-dhahab fī adab al-ṭalab. Yāqūt mentions how he read Ibn al-Samʿānī's own copy of Taʾrīkh Marw, one of his early works. Three other biographical works are known: Wafayāt al-mutaʾakhkhirīn min al-ruwāt, Muʿjām al-shuyūkh (biographies of his son's teachers) and Muʿjām al-buldān.

== Bibliography ==
- Chittick, W. C. (1995). "al-Samʿānī, Abu ʾl-Ḳāsim". In Bosworth, C. E.; van Donzel, E.; Heinrichs, W. P. & Lecomte, G. (eds.). The Encyclopaedia of Islam, Second Edition. Volume VIII: Ned–Sam. Leiden: E. J. Brill. p. 1024. ISBN 978-90-04-09834-3.
- Sellheim, R. (1995). "al-Samʿānī, Abū Saʿd". In Bosworth, C. E.; van Donzel, E.; Heinrichs, W. P. & Lecomte, G. (eds.). The Encyclopaedia of Islam, Second Edition. Volume VIII: Ned–Sam. Leiden: E. J. Brill. pp. 1024–1025. ISBN 978-90-04-09834-3.
- Yazigi, Maya (2011). "A Claim of Tajdīd for the Sixth/Twelfth Century? al-Samānī, his Kitāb al-Ansāb and a Legacy Contested" (PDF). Oriens. 39 (2): 165–198. doi:10.1163/187783711X588105.
