= Siyar A'lam al-Nubala' =

Biographical dictionary by al-Dhahabi

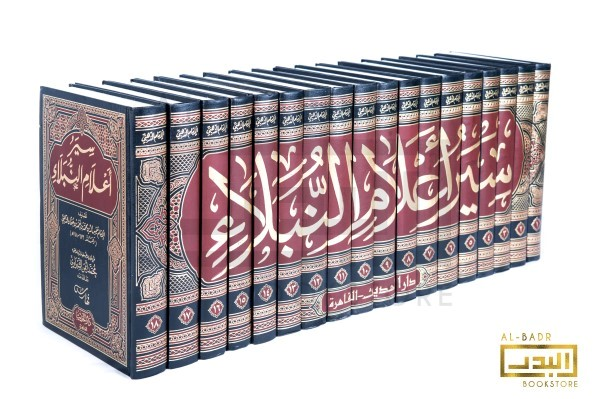
- Book of Siyar A'lam an-Nubala
- Author: Al-Dhahabi
- Original title: سير أعلام النبلاء
- Language: Arabic
- Subject: Biographical dictionary
- Genre: Biography
- Published: 14th century
- Publication place: Mamluk Sultanate
- Media type: Manuscript
- Pages: 28 volumes

Siyar A‘lām al-Nubalā’ (Arabic: سير أعلام النبلاء, lit. 'Biographies of Eminent Nobles') is a biographical dictionary written by al-Dhahabi containing biographies of eminent Muslims throughout Islamic history up to al-Dhahabi's era. The first two of the Siyar's fourteen volumes, which concern the life of Muhammad and the Rashidun caliphs, are reproduced from al-Dhahabi's more expansive Tarikh. Al-Dhahabi divided the book into chapters according to the generations in which the different personalities lived.

== See also ==
- Tabaqat al-Shafi'iyya al-Kubra
