= Abd al-Ghani al-Maqdisi =

Sunni scholar and hadith master (1146–1203)

- Title: Taqi al-Dīn

Personal life
- Born: 1146 CE/541 AH
- Died: 1203 CE/600 AH
- Resting place: Al-Qurāfah cemetery, Egypt
- Era: Islamic golden age
- Region: Ash-Sham
- Main interest: Hadith
- Notable works: al-Kamal fi ma`rifat al-rijal; Umdat al-Ahkam (The Foundation of Rulings)
- Occupation: Islamic scholar

Religious life
- Religion: Islam
- Jurisprudence: Hanbali
- Tariqa: Qadiri
- Creed: Athari

Muslim leader
- Influenced by: Abu-al-Faraj Ibn Al-Jawzi

Abd al-Ghani ibn Abd al-Wahid al-Maqdisi (Arabic: عبد الغني بن عبد الواحد المقدسي, romanized: ʿAbd al-Ghāni ibn ʿAbd al-Waḥīd al-Maqdisī; 1146 – 1203) was a classical Sunni Islamic scholar and a prominent hadith master. He was born in 1146 CE (541 AH) in the village of Jummail in Palestine. He studied with scholars in Damascus; many of whom were from his own extended family. He studied with the Imam of Tasawwuf, Shaykh Abdul Qadir al-Jilani. He was the first person to establish a school on Mount Qasioun near Damascus. He died in 1203 CE (600 AH).

He was a relative of Diya al-Din al-Maqdisi, as his mother and Diya al-Din al-Maqdisi's grandmother were sisters. He had three sons named Muhammad, Abdullah and Abdur-Rahman, all of whom became prominent scholars. The scholar, Ibn Qudamah al-Maqdisi was the maternal cousin of Abdul-Ghani, and Ibn Qudāmah described his association with Abdul-Ghani as:

"My friend in childhood and in seeking knowledge, and never did we race to goodness except that he would precede me to it, with the exception of [a] small [number of occasions]"

He was the author of Al-Kamal fi Asma' al-Rijal, a collection of biographies of hadith narrators within the Islamic discipline of biographical evaluation.

== Works ==
His works include:

- Kitāb ut-Tawḥīd
- Akhbār Ad-Dajjāl
- Al-`Itiqād - A short text that outlines the foundational creed.
- Al-Jāmi' as-Saghīr Li Ahkām al-Bashīr an-Nadhīr
- I`tiqād ul-Imām Ash-Shafi`ī -The author shows the complete agreement between all the Imams on foundational theology and particularly the Imam’s dislike for speculative theology (Kalam).
- Al-Ahkām
- Al-Arba'īn Min Kalām Rabbil-Aalamīn
- Amr bi-l-Maʿrūf wa-n-Nahy ʿani-l-Munkar
- At-Targhīb fid-Du'ā al-Hathth Alayhi
- At-Tawakkul was Su'āl Allāh Azza wa Jall
- Al-Aathār al-Mardiyyah Fī Fadā'il Khayr il-Bariyyah
- Al-Iqtiṣād fil-I'tiqād-This is a book on advanced theology that itemises creed into a series of themes.
- Al-Miṣbaḥ fī `Uyun il-Aḥādith aṣ-Ṣiḥaḥ
- Mukhtaṣar Sīrah an-Nabī wa Sīrah Aṣḥabihi al-‘Asharah (Short Biographies of the Prophet and His Ten Companions who were given the Tidings of Paradise)
- Ṭuḥfat ut-Ṭālibīn fīl Jīhad wal-Mujāhidīn
- Umdat ul-Aḥkām min Kalām Khayr il-Kalām
- Umdat ul-Aḥkām al-kubrā - Extended version of Umdat ul-Aḥkām min Kalām Khayr il-Kalām.
- Faḍā'il ul-Hajj
- Faḍā'il us-Ṣadaqah
- Faḍā'il Ashar Dhil-Hijjah
- Faḍā'il Umar bin al-Khattāb
- Faḍā'il Makkah
- Al-Kamāl Fī Ma'rifat ir-Rijāl
- Miḥnah Imām Aḥmad bin Ḥanbal

== See also ==
- Maqdisi (nesbat)
- History of Hadith

== Bibliography ==
- Drory, Joseph (1988). "Hanbalis of the Nablus Region in the Eleventh and Twelfth Centuries". Asian and African Studies. 22: 93–112.
- Talmon-Heller, D. (2009). "'Ilm, Baraka, Shafa'a – the Resources of Ayyubid and Early Mamluk 'Ulama". Mamluk Studies Review. 13/2: 1–23.
