= Mizan al-Itidal =

- Author: Imam al-Dhahabi (675-748 AH)
- Original title: ميزان الاعتدال
- Language: Arabic
- Genre: Ilm al-Rijal (عِلْمُ الرِّجال) Biographical evaluation

Mizan al-Itidal (Arabic: لميزان الاعتدال) or Mizan al-I'tidal fi Naqd ar-Rijal (Arabic: لميزان الاعتدال) is one of the most important works of Ilm al-Rijal (Science of Narrators or Biographical evaluation) written by Imam al-Dhahabi (675-748 AH) in the 8th century of Islamic History in Hijri calendar.

== Description ==
Mizan al-Itidal is the rework of an Imam Ibn 'Adi al-Jurjani's (277-375 H) book by the name of al-Kamil fi Dhu'afa' al-Rijal. Imam al-Dhahabi has since extended it, refined it, and called it Mizan al-Itidal. It is one of the most famous books in the field of Ilm al-Rijal (Science of Narrators or Biographical evaluation), and is published in five volumes that contain more than 3000 pages. The book is in alphabetical order, in which the author identifies liar narrators, unknown narrators, and those narrators who are to be abandoned. He also distinguishes weak narrators from scholars in hadith whose degree is low due to memory or certain other breaches. He also took care to avoid some misleading statements that may exist in some Hadith Scholars (Muhaddiths) and which are ambiguous on the weakness of the narrator.

== Publications ==
The book has been published by many organizations around the world:

- Mizan al-I'tidal fi Naqd al-Rijal 5 VOLUMES (مِيزَانُ الإِعْتِدَال فِي نَقْدِ الرِّجَال) by Imam Shams al-Din al-Dhahabi: Published: al-Risalah al-'Alamiyyah | Beirut, Lebanon
- Mizan al-I'tidal fi Naqd ar-Rijal - Dhahabi ('Ilm Jarh wa Ta'dil): Published:مؤسسة الرسالة
- Mizan al-I'tidal fi Naqd al-Rijal - Dhahabi : Published: Al-Resalah, 2017

== See also ==
- List of Sunni books
- Kutub al-Sittah
