= Ibn Asakir =

Islamic scholar and historian (1105–1176)

Ibn‘Asākir
- ابن عساكر

Personal life
- Born: Damascus Muharram 499AH / September, 1105
- Died: Damascus 11 Rajab, 571AH/ 24 January 1176 (aged 71)
- Era: Islamic golden age
- Region: Syria (Burid dynasty/Zengid dynasty)
- Main interest(s): Hadith, Fiqh History
- Notable work(s): History of Damascus, Tabyin Kadhib al-Muftari
- Occupation: Muhaddith, Scholar, Muslim Jurist, Historian

Religious life
- Religion: Islam
- Denomination: Sunni
- Jurisprudence: Shafi'i
- Creed: Ash'ari

Muslim leader
- Influenced by: Al-Shafi'i Abu al-Hasan al-Ash'ari Al-Hakim al-Nishapuri Al-Bayhaqi Al-Khatib al-Baghdadi
- Influenced: Late Hadith Scholars, Late Muslim Historians

Ibn Asakir (Arabic: ابن عساكر, romanized: Ibn ‘Asākir; 1105–c. 1176) was a Syrian Sunni Islamic scholar, who was one of the most prominent and renowned experts on Hadith and Islamic history in the medieval era, and a disciple of the Sufi mystic Abu al-Najib Suhrawardi. Ibn Asakir was an accomplished jurist, hadith specialist and a prolific writer. He was the pre-eminent figure of the Asakir dynasty, whose family members occupied the most prominent positions as judges and scholars of the Shafi'i school of the Sunni law in Damascus for almost two centuries.

== Name and Titles ==
His full name was ‘Alī ibn al-Ḥasan ibn Hibat Allāh ibn `Abd Allāh, Thiqat al-Dīn, Abū al-Qasim, known as Ibn `Asakir al-Dimashqi al-Shafi`i al-Ash`ari (الحافظ المؤرخ علي بن الحسن بن ھبة اللہ بن عبداللہ بن الحسین الدمشقي الشافعي).

Ibn Asakir is often given the honorary epithets such as Al-Imam (The Leader), al-'Allamah (The Learned one), al-Hafidh (The Wise one) al-Kabeer (The Noble One), Al-Fakhruddin (The pride of the Religion), al-Mujawwad (The perfect Reciter), Muhaddith ash-Sham (Hadith Master of Levant) and Imam al-Muhaddithin (Leader of Hadith Masters).

== Life ==
Born in Damascus, during the reign of atabeg Toghtekin, he started his religious education at the age of six years old, attending with his father and older brother to the learning centres of several renowned Damascene scholars. Ibn Asakir received an extensive education, as befitting someone from a wealthy family. Between 520/1126 and 535/1141, Ibn Asakir embarked on his two major educational journeys that took him to the most important educational centers in the Islamic world, from Egypt to Hejaz (Mecca and Medina) to Iran and Central Asia (Khurasan and Transoxiana); he wrote a three volume book, Mu al-shuyukh, in which he mentioned some fourteen hundred teachers whom he met and studied with, including studying under 80 female Muslim scholars. The massive knowledge that he had gained, especially in hadith, law, and scriptural exegesis, earned him the title of Ḥāfiẓ (great memorizer), and he became the most learned and renowned scholar of his era.

== Relationship with the rulers ==
Shortly after Ibn Asakir returned from his extensive travels to settle in his hometown of Damascus, Nur ad-Din Zangi conquered the city in (529/1154). Nur al-Din's political and religious plans had two ideas first, to unite both Syria and Egypt under the banner of Sunni Islam and to eradicate the Fatamid Shi'i dynasty; second on organizing an effective military campaign against the crusaders. Nur al-Din found Ibn Asakir as the perfect scholar who could help him achieve his plans: an ardent defender of Sunni Islam, in particular the Ash'ari school. Under the patronage of Nur ad-Din, Ibn Asakir wrote the Tarikh Dimashq. In 1170, Nur al-Din built the Madrasa Dar al-Hadith (School of Hadith) for Ibn Asakir.

== Teaching ==
He first began teaching hadith in the Umayyad mosque and was appointed as the hadith master there in Damascus, then in the Dar al-Sunna madrassa (which was then renamed Dar al-Hadith al-Ashrafiyya) built for him by Nur al-Din as a recognition for his high scholarly prestige and reward for his relentless jihad propaganda. Ibn Asakir shunned all types of material goods and refused the office of head preacher, only to strictly focus on writing, teaching, and worshipping.

As he was world famous, he also lectured in many famous learning centers:

- Adh-Dhuhriyyu
- Al-Jaami' fi-l-Haththi 'alaa Hifzwi-l-'Ilm
- Dhammu-l-Malaahee
- Maddhu-t-Tawaadwu'i Wadhammu-l-Kibbr
- Majjlisaan minn Majaalis fee Masjidi-Dimashqq
- Majjmoo'a Feehi Khawmsi
- Sa'ati Rawhmatullaah
- Nafee Tashbiyah
- Swiffati-Allaah Ta'alaa

== Students ==
Ibn Asakir had a large number of students with some becoming world-class leading scholars in their times; amongst them:

- Ibn al-Sam'ani
- Ibn al-Athir
- Ibn al-Dubaythi
- Izz al-Din ibn 'Abd al-Salam
- Ibn al-Salah
- Ibn Arabi
- Sultan Saladin (famous Islamic conqueror and ruler); was also his student and had a profound impact on Saladin's life to the point he would attend to Ibn Asakir's funeral.

== Creed ==
In his book entitled Tabyin Kadhib al-Muftari, he staunchly defends Imam Abu Hasan al-Ash'ari and his school. The following lines of poetry were included in his book's conclusion:

"I have chosen a doctrine that in no way resembles innovation But which successors faithfully took from predecessors. Those who are impartial declare my doctrine sound While those who criticize it have abandoned impartiality."

== Death ==
Ibn Asakir, the Imam of the hadith scholars and historians died in 24 January 571/1176 at the age of 71 and was buried at the Bab al-Saghir cemetery, next to his father and near to the grave of the Caliph Mu`awiya.

== Legacy ==
His was a tumultuous time: centuries of Shia reign had not long ended in central Syria, rival warlords sought dominate the capital Damascus, and Crusaders had conquered Jerusalem. Seeking the unification of Syria and Egypt, and the revival of Sunni Islam in both regions, Ibn ‘Asakir served successive Muslim rulers, including Nur al-Din and Saladin, and produced propaganda against both the Christian invaders and the Shia's. This, together with his influential writings and his advocacy of major texts, helped to lay the foundations for the eventual Sunni domination of the Levant and Egypt, a domination which continues to this day.

During Ibn Asakir's intense journeys for education to the east. It is said that he was the first scholar in Damascus to bring many copies of books that have never reached Damascus before in history. Due to so much knowledge and information he gathered, he manage to share these new pieces of valuable information in Umayyad Mosque and began teaching there. Due to this, Damascus would later grow into becoming the Islamic center and birth many great scholars. The city would eclipse both Islamic leading centers such as Baghdad and Nishapur after the Mongol invasion. Ibn Asakir's collection's would later spread all over the west impacting further Islamic knowledge.

Al-Qasim the son of Ibn Asakir would narrate two unique reports that prophesize his legacy.

I (Al-Qasim) used to hear my father (Ibn 'Asakir) say that, while his mother was pregnant, his father had a vision in a dream informing him that he would beget a son whom God would use to revivify Sunnism.

When my mother became pregnant with me, she saw in her dream someone telling her: "You will beget a child who will become very important. When you deliver him, bring him on the fortieth day of his birth to the Grotto - meaning the Grotto of Blood in the Mount Qasyun - and give alms, for then God will bless him and bless the Muslims by him."

The famous scholar Ibn Kathir quoted these two reports in his biography of Ibn 'Asakir and commented on it by saying:

"I say that these visions are indeed true, and what proves it is that he brought to Syria the most famous books of Islam, such as the Musnad Ahmad ibn Hanbal and the Musnad Abu Yaʽla and other Hadith books, the massive ones and concise ones. "

== Reception ==
Al-Mundhiri asked his teacher Abu al-Hasan `Ali ibn al-Mufaddal al-Maqdisi: "Which of these four contemporary hadith masters is the greatest?" He replied: "Name them." Al-Mundhiri said: "Ibn `Asakir and Ibn Nasir?" He replied: "Ibn `Asakir." Al-Mundhiri went on: "Ibn `Asakir and Abu al-`Ala' [al-Hasan ibn Ahmad ibn al-Hasan al-Hamadhani]?" He said: "Ibn `Asakir." Al-Mundhiri continued: "Ibn `Asakir and al-Silafi?" Al-Maqdisi said: "Al-Silafi (is) our shaykh. Al-Silafi (is) our shaykh." He impliedly acknowledged Ibn 'Asakir's supremacy but couched it in terms of the pupil's expected deportment towards his master. Ibn al-Subki states Ibn al-Sam'ani was superior than all of them with the exception of Ibn Asakir and claims the reason is because Al-Sam'ani lived far away in Merv while the other hadith scholars lived or near Egypt and Sham.

Ibn al-Najjar said about him: "He was the Imam (leader) of all the hadith scholars of his time and the chief leader in memorization, meticulous verification, thorough knowledge in the sciences of hadith, trustworthiness, nobility, and excellence in writing and beautiful recitation. He is the seal of this science."

Al-Nawawi describes him as: “The Hafiz (great hadith scholar) of Syria, nay! the Hafiz of the entire world!!!”

Al-Dhahabi said: "There was no one in his time equal to him in the command (sciences) of Hadith or more knowledge about Hadith transmitters (Ilm al-Rijal). Whoever reads his Ta'rikh realizes the man's pre-eminence."

Taj al-Din al-Subki said: "He is the leading teacher, the protector of the Sunnah and its servant, the vanquisher of Satan's army by his scholarship and their slayer, the memorizers of Hadith. No one can deny his eminence, for it is the desire of those who embark on the journeys of knowledge and the endpoint for those who have great resolve among the seekers. He is the sine qua non by the unanimous agreement of the community, the attainer of what is beyond aspirations, the ocean that is not bounded by a shoreline, and the erudite who carried the burden of spreading the Sunnah. He spent his days and nights indefatigably pursuing all fields of scholarship. His only companions were knowledge and hard work, for they were his utmost desire. His memory captured even the slightest detail, his precision and combined the new and the old, his command put him on par with those who came before him if not exceeding them, and his breadth of knowledge was so enriching that everyone else was as a beggar compared to him."

== Works ==
1. History of Damascus (Arabic: Tarikh Dimashq) is one of the most important books about the Islamic history and considered his magnum opus (80 volumes).At 8.1 million words it is one of the largest books ever produced in Arabic and the largest Biographical Dictionary ever.
2. Al-Muwaafaqaat `alaa Shuyukhu-l-A'immati-th-Thiqaawt (72 volumes).
3. `Awali Malik ibn Anas wa Dhayl 'alaa `Awali Malik ibn Anas (50 volumes).
4. Manaaqib ash-Shubbaan (15 volumes).
5. Al-Mu`jam (12 volumes) listing only the names of his shaykhs.
6. Fadaa'il Ashaabi-l-Hadeeth (11 volumes): Fadl al-Jumu`a, Fadl Quraysh, Fada'il al-Siddiq, Fada'il Makka, Fada'il al-Madina, Fada'il Bayt al-Muqaddas, Fada'il `Ashura', Fada'il al-Muharram, Fada'il Sha`ban.
7. Ghawraaw'ibb Malik (10 volumes).
8. Al-Suba`iyyat (7 volumes), listing narrations with chains containing only seven narrators up to the Islamic prophet Muhammad.
9. Yawmi-l-Mazeed (3 volumes).
10. Al-Ishraf `ala Ma`rifatu-l-Atraf.
11. Akhbar al-Awza`i.
12. Al-Musalsalat.
13. Bayan al-Wahm wa al-Takhlit fi Hadith al-Atit ("The Exposition of Error and Confusion in the Narration of the [Throne's] Groaning")
14. At-Tawbah wa Sa'atu Rahmatullaah (Repentance and the Intensity of the Mercy of Allaah)
15. Al-Arba'oon fee Manaaqib Ummahaati-l-Mu'mineen (R) (including Fadlu Ummu-l-Mu'mineen Aa'ishah (R))
16. Arba`un Hadithan fi al-Jihad.
17. Arba`un Hadithan `an Arba`ina Shaykhan min Arba`ina Madeenah.
18. Tabyin Kadhib al-Muftari fima Nusiba ila al-Imam Abi al-Hasan al-Ash'ari is a biography of Al-Ash'ari, relaying his ancestry, his conversion from Mu'tazilism and his subsequent "middle position" creed, i.e. Orthodox Sunni Islam.

== See also ==
- List of Ash'aris
- List of Islamic scholars
- Al-Zahiriyah Library

== Sources ==
- Zulfiqar Ayub (2 May 2015). THE BIOGRAPHIES OF THE ELITE LIVES OF THE SCHOLARS, IMAMS & HADITH MASTERS Biographies of The Imams & Scholars. pp. 81–84.
