= Ibn Hajar al-Asqalani =

Egyptian Islamic scholar (1372–1449)

Imam Ibn Hajar al-Asqalani
- ابن حجر العسقلاني
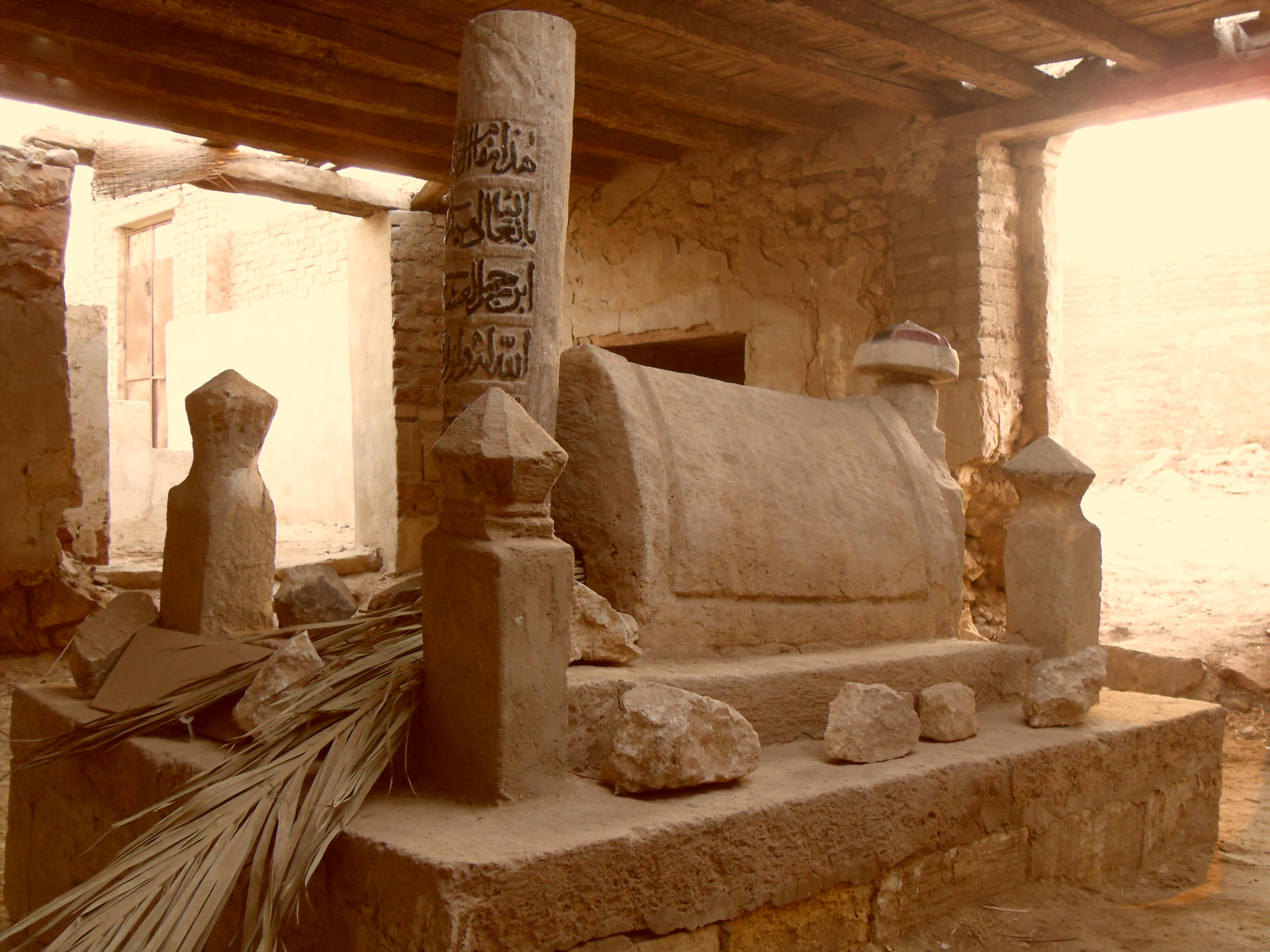
- Tomb of Ibn Hajar al-Asqalani in Cairo
- Title: Shaykh al-Islam; Hafiz

Personal life
- Born: 18 February 1372 Cairo, Mamluk Sultanate
- Died: 2 February 1449 (aged 76) Cairo, Mamluk Sultanate
- Resting place: City of the Dead, Cairo, Egypt
- Era: Bahri Era; Burji Era

Religious life
- Religion: Islam
- Denomination: Sunni
- Jurisprudence: Shafi'i
- Creed: Ash'ari

Muslim leader
- Influenced: Al-Sakhawi Zakariyya al-Ansari Al-Suyuti
- Arabic name
- Personal (Ism): Aḥmad أَحْمَد
- Patronymic (Nasab): Ibn ʿAlī ibn Muḥammad ibn Muḥammad ibn ʿAlī ibn Maḥmūd ٱبْن عَلِيّ ٱبْن مُحَمَّد ٱبْن مُحَمَّد ٱبْن عَلِيّ ٱبْن مَحْمُود
- Teknonymic (Kunya): Abū al-Faḍl أَبُو ٱلْفَضْل
- Epithet (Laqab): Ibn Ḥajar ٱبْن حَجَر
- Toponymic (Nisba): Al-ʿAsqalānī ٱلْعَسْقَلَانِيّ

Ibn Hajar al Asqalani ( full name: Abu al Fadl Ahmad ibn Ali ibn Muhammad al Kinani). (Arabic: ابن حجر العسقلاني; (Note: Full name: Shihāb al-Dīn Abū al-Faḍl Aḥmad ibn Nūr al-Dīn ʿAlī ibn Muḥammad ibn Ḥajar al-ʿAsqalānī al-Kināni) 18 February 1372 – 2 February 1449), or simply ibn Ḥajar, was a classic Islamic scholar "whose life work constitutes the final summation of the science of hadith." He authored some 150 works on hadith, history, biography, exegesis, poetry, and the Shafi'i school of jurisprudence, the most valued of which being his commentary of Sahih al-Bukhari, titled Fath al-Bari. He is known by the honorific epithets Hafiz al-Asr (lit. "Hafiz of the Time"), Shaykh al-Islam ("Shaykh of Islam"), and Amir al-Mu'minin fi al-Hadith ("Commander of the Faithful in Hadith").

He was regarded as the foremost scholar of the fifteenth century across all fields of Islamic law.

== Early life ==
He was born into an Arab Kinani family in Cairo on 22 Shaʿbān 773 AH, corresponding to February 28th 1372.He was the son of the Shafi'i scholar and poet Nur ad-Din 'Ali. His parents had moved from Alexandria, originally hailing from Ascalon (Arabic: عَسْقَلَان, ʿAsqalān). His mother was named Sitt al-Tujjar ("Mistress of Merchants").

"Ibn Hajar" was the nickname of one of his ancestors, which was extended to his children and grandchildren and became his most prominent title. He was known by the kunya Abū al-Faḍl, and he was called al-ʿAsqalānī in attribution to Aqsalān (Ashkelon) in Palestine, the homeland of his family; and al-Kinānī in attribution to Kināna, to which his lineage goes back.

His father, Ali bin Muhammad Asqalani, was also a scholar who, besides engaging in trade like his forefathers, knew the seven canonical Qurʾānic readings (qirāʾāt al-sabʿ), composed poetry, and wrote a supplement (istidrāk) to al-Nawawī’s al-Adhkār. For a while, he was the deputy of Ibn Aqeel Baha'udin, Abu Muhammad Abdullah bin Abdur Rahman Shafi'i. He was also a poet and had several diwans and was allowed to give fatwas . Both of his parents died in his infancy, and he and his sister, Sitt ar-Rakb, became wards of his father's first wife's brother, Zaki ad-Din al-Kharrubi, who enrolled Ibn Hajar in Qur'anic studies when he was five years old. Here he excelled, learning Surah Maryam in a single day and memorising the entire Qur'an by the age of 9. He progressed to the memorization of texts such as the abridged version of Ibn al-Hajib's work on the foundations of fiqh.

== Education ==
When he accompanied al-Kharrubi to Mecca at the age of 12, he was considered competent to lead the Tarawih prayers during Ramadan. When his guardian died in 1386, Ibn Hajar's education in Egypt was entrusted to hadith scholar Shams ad-Din ibn al-Qattan, who entered him in the courses given by Sirajud-Din al-Bulqini (d. 1404) and Ibn al-Mulaqqin (d. 1402) in Shafi'i fiqh, and Zain al-Din al-'Iraqi (d. 1404) in hadith, after which he travelled to Damascus and Jerusalem, to study under Shamsud-Din al-Qalqashandi (d. 1407), Badr al-Din al-Balisi (d. 1401), and Fatima bint al-Manja at-Tanukhiyya (d. 1401). He learned the fundamentals of Hadith and other subjects from the renowned scholar Izz al-Din Ibn Jama'ah,. After a further visit to Mecca, Medina, and Yemen, he returned to Egypt. Al-Suyuti said: "It is said that he drank Zamzam water in order to reach the level of adh-Dhahabi in memorization—which he succeeded in doing, even surpassing him."

Ibn Ḥajar benefited from 628 teachers, 55 of them women. Among his female teachers were Fāṭima al-Tanūkhiyya and Fāṭima al-Maqdisiyya, from whom he read various works. Rivalries arose between Ibn Ḥajar and scholars such as Walī al-Dīn al-Seftī, Muḥammad b. ʿAṭāʾ Allāh al-Harawī, Shams al-Dīn al-Hirmāwī, and Muḥammad b. Ismāʿīl al-Wanāʾī due to posts such as chief judgeship and teaching.

== Personal life ==
In 1397, at the age of twenty-five, Al-'Asqalani married the celebrated hadith expert Uns Khatun, who held ijazat from 'Abdur-Rahim al-'Iraqi and gave public lectures to crowds of 'ulama', including as-Sakhawi. He had five daughters from Uns, and one daughter from a later wife. All of his daughters died during his lifetime. He married a third time, but his only son was Abū al-Maʿālī Badr al-Dīn Muḥammad, born 815 AH / 1412 CE to a slave woman of Tatar origin. It is not known for sure, but there is good reason to suspect that his son was not qualified for the scholarly positions in which his father tried to place him, nor was he a good administrator of either college finances or his own.

Ibn Ḥajar was of medium height, refined-looking, yet awe-inspiring and energetic. He did not give importance to food and drink.Because of his quick comprehension and strong memory, he could follow and correct texts being read to him while he was writing something else.

== Positions ==
Ibn Hajar went on to be appointed to the position of Egyptian qadi (chief judge) several times. He had a scholarly rivalry with the Hanafi scholar Badr al-Din al-Ayni.

== Death ==
Ibn Hajar died after 'Isha' (night prayer) on 8th Dhul-Hijjah 852 (2 February 1449), aged 79. The funeral prayer was led by the ʿAbbāsid caliph, and an estimated 50,000 people attended his funeral in Cairo, including Sultan Sayfud-Din Jaqmaq (1373–1453 CE) and Caliph of Cairo Al-Mustakfi II (r. 1441–1451 CE). He was buried in Karāfat al-Ṣughrā Cemetery.

== Works ==
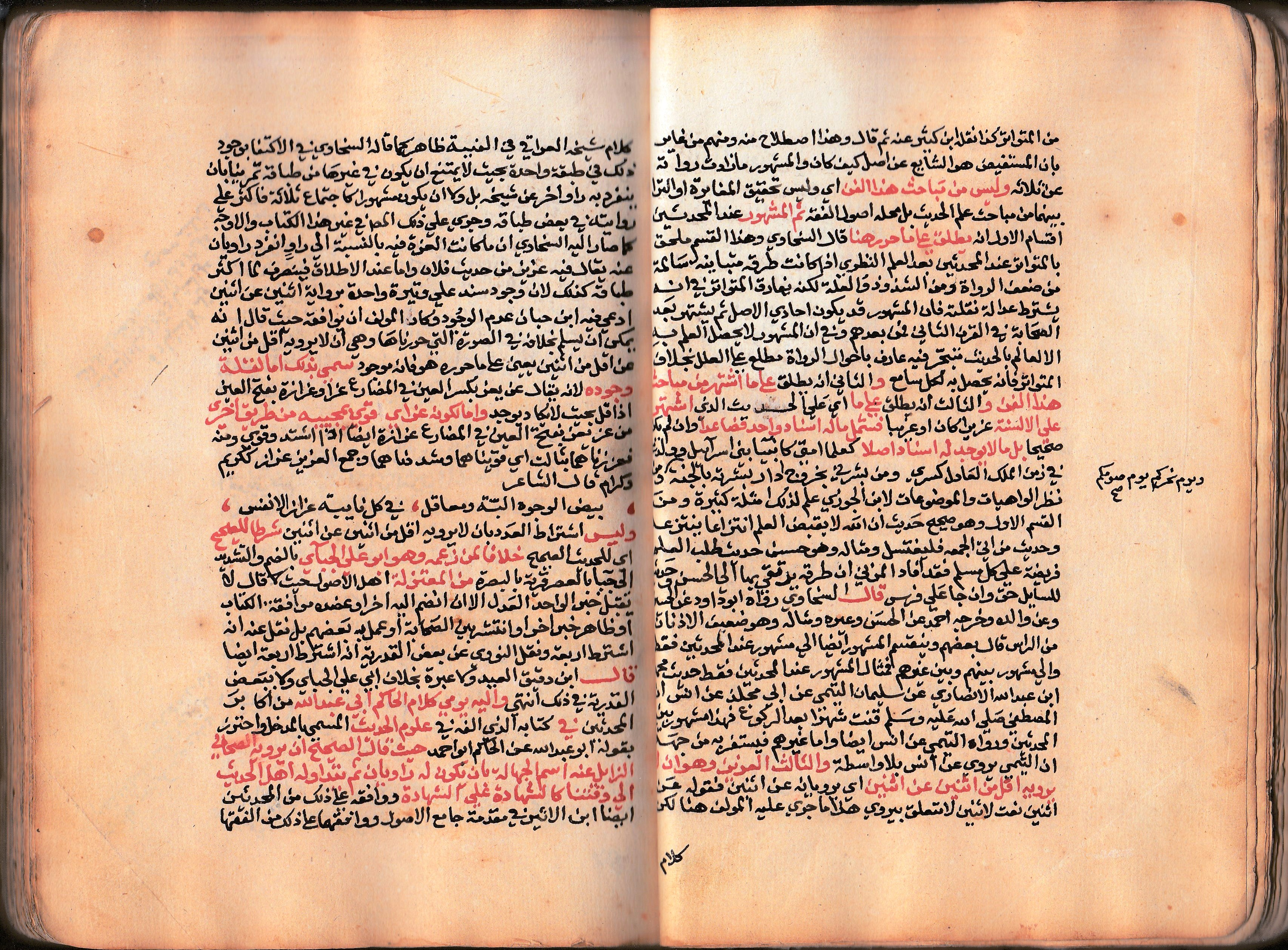
18th-century manuscript of Ibn Hajar's Sharh al-Nukhba fi Mustalah al-Hadith

Ibn Hajar wrote approximately 150 works on hadith, hadith terminology, biographical evaluation, history, tafsir, poetry and Shafiʽi jurisprudence, however, he was not satisfied with many of his works and expressed a desire to revise them, but circumstances didn't allow him the opportunity. Al Sakhawi, a student of Ibn Hajar, documented his teacher's dissatisfaction with many of his works. According to him, Ibn Hajar authored many of his works during the early stages of his career, and he regretted not having the opportunity to revise or refine them to his satisfaction. However, he made specific exceptions for certain key works, stating:

Only my commentary on Ṣaḥīḥ al-Bukhārī (Fatḥ al-Bārī), its introduction, al-Muštabiḥ, Tahḏīb al-Tahḏīb, and Lisān al-Mīzān are works I consider to be somewhat complete and polished.

His major works include

- Fath al-Bari – Ibn Hajar's commentary of Sahih al-Bukhari's 1414 Jamiʿ al-Sahih, completing an unfinished work begun by Ibn Rajab in the 1390s. It became the most celebrated and highly regarded work on the author. Celebrations near Cairo on its publication in December 1428 were described by historian Ibn Iyas (d. 1522/4), as "the greatest of the age". Many of Egypt's leading dignitaries were among the crowds, ibn Hajar gave readings, poets gave eulogies and gold was distributed. Jaques focuses on the most widely read of Ibn Hajar's works—the commentary on the greatest compilation of hadiths, Sahih al-Bukhari, and his history of the Mamluks—and explains how he drew on the theories, ideas, and aspirations of the preceding centuries of Islamic scholarship to project an enduring solution to the crises of his time.
- al-Isabah fi tamyiz al Sahabah – the most comprehensive dictionary of the Companions of the Prophet.
- Merits of the Plague (بذل الماعون في أخبار الطاعون), a discussion of the Black Death and meditations on illness and the Divine, which contains excerpts from Fatḥ al-Bārī
- al-Durar al-Kāminah – a biographical dictionary of leading figures of the eighth century.
- Tahdhib al-Tahdhib – an abbreviation of Tahdhib al-Kamal, the encyclopedia of hadith narrators by Jamal al-Din al-Mizzi
- Taqrib al-Tahdhib – the abridgement of Tahdhib al-Tahdhib.
- Ta'jil al-Manfa'ah – biographies of the narrators of the Musnads of the four Imams, not found in at-Tahthib.
- Bulugh al-Maram – on hadith used in Shafi'i fiqh.
- Nata'ij al-Afkar fi Takhrij Ahadith al-Adhkar
- Lisan al-Mizan – a reworking of Mizan al-'Itidal by al-Dhahabi, which in turn is a reworking of an earlier work.
- Talkhis al-Habir fi Takhrij al-Rafiʿi al-Kabir
- al-Diraya fi Takhrij Ahadith al-Hidaya
- Taghliq al-Taʿliq ʿala Sahih al-Bukhari
- Risala Tadhkirat al-Athar
- al-Matalib al-ʿAliya bi Zawa'id al-Masanid al-Thamaniya
- Nukhbat al-Fikar along with his explanation of it entitled Nuzhah al-Nadhar in hadith terminology
- al-Nukat ala Kitab ibn al-Salah – commentary on the Introduction to the Science of Hadith by ibn al-Salah
- al-Qawl al-Musaddad fi Musnad Ahmad a discussion of hadith of disputed authenticity in the Musnad of Ahmad ibn Hanbal
- Silsilat al-Dhahab
- Taʿrif Ahl al-Taqdis bi Maratib al-Mawsufin bi al-Tadlis
- Raf' al-isr 'an qudat Misr – a biographical dictionary of Egyptian judges. Partial French translation in Mathieu Tillier, Vie des cadis de Misr. Cairo: Institut français d'archéologie orientale, 2002.

== See also ==
- List of Ash'aris and Maturidis
- Nur al-Din Ali ibn Da'ud al-Jawhari al-Sayrafi, a student of Ibn Hajar
