= Aḥmad Samʿānī =

Arab scholar, preacher, poet and Sufi (1094 – 1140)

Abu ʾl-Qāsim Aḥmad ibn Manṣūr ibn Muḥammad ibn ʿAbd al-Jabbār al-Samʿānī (1094 – 11 June 1140), known in Persian as Aḥmad Samʿānī, was an Arab scholar, preacher and poet. He was the author of Rawḥ al-arwāḥ fī sharḥ asmāʾ al-malik al-fattāḥ, a Persian prose commentary on the names of God in Islam that extends for some six hundred pages.

According to the genealogies, the Samʿān were a branch of the Arab tribe of Tamīm. Aḥmad's family was from Merv. His father, Abu ʾl-Muẓaffar Manṣūr (1035–1096), was a noted Shāfiʿī scholar who wrote about tafsīr, ḥadīth and fiqh. In 1135, Aḥmad and his nephew ʿAbd al-Karīm, son of his elder brother Abū Bakr Muḥammad, went to Nīshāpūr to study ḥadīth. In his nephew's biographical dictionary, al-Ansāb, Aḥmad's elegant preaching and poetry are praised, but his writings are not mentioned.

Rawḥ al-arwāḥ ("Comfort of Spirits") is a work of the highest literary quality. Intended for recitation, it ranks with the best prose works of the period, such as those of al-Ghazālī. It is the earliest Persian commentary on the subject of the divine names. It covers 101 names in 74 chapters. The names, however, are dealt with briefly, being in fact only starting points for discussions of salvation and love. Love is the central theme of the work. God is to be obeyed out of love not fear, and suffering exists to increase mankind's desire for God, whose mercy and compassion Samʿānī stresses over his wrath.

Rawḥ al-arwāḥ was once a little-known work, but since Najīb Hirawī published an edition in 1989, it has come to be regarded as a classic of Ṣūfī literature.

== Excerpt ==
An example of Samʿānī's approach can be found in his discussion of the role of Adam:

In the row of purity they gave Adam, the chosen, a cup full of the unmixed wine of love. From the distant Pleiades to the end of the earth they set up the hat of his good fortune and the mirror of his magnificence. Then they commanded the angels of the celestial kingdom to prostrate themselves before him. But his magnificence, honor, eminence, good fortune, high level, and purity did not appear in that prostration. It appeared in "Adam disobeyed" (Qurʾān 20:121). In certainty and in truth, these words extend higher than the Throne of God's majesty. Why? Because being treated kindly in the time of conformity is no proof of honor. Being treated kindly in the time of opposition is the proof of honor.

The chosen and beautiful Adam sat on the throne of majesty and perfection with the crown of prosperity on his head and the robe of bounty across his breast. The mount of beneficence was at the door, the pillars of his good fortune's seat were higher than the Throne, the umbrella of kingship was opened above his head, and he himself had raised the exalted banner of knowledge in the world. If the angels and the celestial spheres should kiss the ground before him, that is no surprise. What is surprising is that he fell into the pit of that slip. His straight stature, which had been pulled up by "God elected Adam" (Qurʾān 3:33), became bent because "Adam disobeyed." Then from the heaven of eternal gentleness the crown of "Then He chose him" (Qurʾān 20:122) took wing. O dervish, if God had not wanted to accept him with all his defects, He would not have created him with all those defects. . .

Do not think that Adam was brought out of Paradise for eating some wheat. God wanted to bring him out. He did not break any commandments. God's commandments remained pure of being broken. Tomorrow, God will bring a million people who committed great sins into Paradise. Should He take Adam out of Paradise for one small act of disobedience?

== Editions ==
- Hirawī, Najīb M., ed. Rawḥ al-arwāḥ fī sharḥ asmāʾ al-malik al-fattāḥ. Tehran: Shirkat-i Intishārāt-i ʿIlmī wa-Farhangī, 1989.

== Bibliography ==
- Chittick, W. C. (1993). "The Myth of Adam's Fall in Aḥmad Samʿānī's Rawḥ al-arwāḥ". In Leonard Lewisohn (ed.). Classical Persian Sufism: From Its Origins to Rumi (700–1300). Khaniqahi Nimatullahi Publications. pp. 337–359.
- Chittick, W. C. (1995). "al-Samʿānī, Abu ʾl-Ḳāsim". In Bosworth, C. E.; van Donzel, E.; Heinrichs, W. P. & Lecomte, G. (eds.). The Encyclopaedia of Islam, Second Edition. Volume VIII: Ned–Sam. Leiden: E. J. Brill. p. 1024. doi:10.1163/1573-3912_islam_SIM_6570. ISBN 978-90-04-09834-3.
- Rustom, Mohammed (2018). "Notes on the Semantic Range of 'Deliverance' in the Quran" (PDF). Journal of the American Oriental Society. 138 (2): 361–367.
- Sellheim, R. (1995). "al-Samʿānī, Abū Saʿd". In Bosworth, C. E.; van Donzel, E.; Heinrichs, W. P. & Lecomte, G. (eds.). The Encyclopaedia of Islam, Second Edition. Volume VIII: Ned–Sam. Leiden: E. J. Brill. pp. 1024–1025. doi:10.1163/1573-3912_islam_COM_0994. ISBN 978-90-04-09834-3.
