= Al-Dhahabi =

Muslim historian and traditionist (1274–1348)

- شَمْسُ الدِّينِ الذَّهَبِيُّ
- Title: Imam

Personal life
- Born: 5 October 1274 (672 AH) Damascus, Mamluk Sultanate
- Died: 3 February 1348 (748 AH) (aged 73) Damascus, Mamluk Sultanate (now Syria)
- Era: Medieval Era (Middle Ages)
- Region: Sham
- Main interest(s): History, Fiqh, Hadith, Aqidah
- Notable work(s): Siyar A'lam al-Nubala'; Mizan al-Itidal
- Occupation: Historian, Scholar, Jurist, Muhaddith

Religious life
- Religion: Islam
- Denomination: Sunni
- Jurisprudence: Shafi'i
- Creed: Athari

Muslim leader
- Influenced by: Ibn Asakir, Ibn Daqiq al-'Id, Al-Dimyati, Zaynab bint ʿUmar b. al-Kindī, Ibn Taymiyya
- Influenced: Salah al-Din al-Ala'i, Ibn Kathir, Taj al-Din al-Subki, Ibn Rajab, Ibn Hajar al-Asqalani

Shams al-Dīn al-Dhahabī (Note: Arabic: (شمس الدين الذهبي)) (Note: Full name: Shams ad-Dīn Abū ʿAbdillāh Muḥammad ibn Aḥmad ibn ʿUthmān ibn Qāymāẓ ibn ʿAbdillāh at-Turkumānī al-Fāriqī ad-Dimashqī) (5 October 1274 – 3 February 1348) was a Syrian Sunni Muslim historian, biographer, and hadith scholar. He authored major biographical and historical works including Siyar A'lam al-Nubala, Tadhkirat al-Huffaz, and Tarikh al-Islam.

Among his best-known teachers and scholarly associates were al-Mizzi, al-Birzali, and Ibn Taymiyya.

== Life ==
Of Turkmen descent, al-Dhahabi was born in Damascus. His name, Ibn al-Dhahabi (son of the goldsmith), reveals his father's profession. He began his study of hadith at age eighteen, travelling from Damascus to Baalbek, Homs, Hama, Aleppo, Nabulus, Cairo, Alexandria, Jerusalem, Hijaz, and elsewhere, before returning to Damascus to teach and write. He authored many works and was widely renowned as a perspicuous critic and expert examiner of the hadith. He wrote an encyclopaedic biographical history and was the foremost authority on the canonical readings of the Qur'an. Some of his teachers were women. At Baalbek, Zaynab bint ʿUmar b. al-Kindī was among his most influential teachers.

al-Dhahabi lost his sight two years before he died, leaving three children: the eldest, his daughter, Amat al-'Aziz, and his two sons, 'Abd Allah and Abu Hurayra 'Abd al-Rahman. The latter son taught the hadith masters Ibn Nasir-ud-din al-Damishqi and Ibn Hajar, and through them transmitted several works authored or narrated by his father.

== Teachers ==
Among al-Dhahabi's most notable teachers in hadith, fiqh and aqida:

- Abd al-Khaliq bin ʿUlwān
- Zaynab bint ʿUmar bin al-Kindī
- Abu al-Hasan 'Ali ibn Mas‘ud ibn Nafis al-Musali
- Ibn Taymiyyah Taqi ad-Din Ahmad ibn Taymiyyah
- Ibn al-Zahiri, Ahmad ibn Muhammad ibn 'Abd Allah al-Halabi
- Al-Dimyati, the foremost Egyptian authority on hadith in his time.
- Ibn Daqiq al-'Id, whom he identified in his youth as Abu al-Fath al-Qushayri, later as Ibn Wahb.
- Jamal-ud-din Abu al-Ma`ali Muhammad ibn 'Ali al-Ansari al-Zamalkani al-Damishqi al-Shafi`i (d. 727), whom he called "Qadi al-Qudat, the Paragon of Islam, the standard-bearer of the Sunna, my shaykh".
- Ahmad ibn Ishaq ibn Muhammad al-Abarquhi al-Misri (d. 701).
- Ibn al-Kharrat al-Dawalibi

== Notable students ==
- Salah al-Din al-Ala'i
- Ibn Kathir
- Taj al-Din al-Subki
- Al-Ṣafadī
- Abu al-Fadl Ja'far ibn 'Ali al-Dimashqi
- Ibn al-Furat
- Also Shams al-Din Dhahabi has written about bibi Heravi and her famous role in Tarikh al-Kabir.

== Works ==
Al-Dhahabi authored nearly a hundred works of history, biography and theology. His history of medicine begins with Ancient Greek and Indian practices and practitioners, such as Hippocrates, Galen, etc., through the Pre-Islamic Arabian era, to Prophetic medicine — as revealed by the Muslim prophet Muhammad— to the medical knowledge contained in works of scholars such as Ibn Sina. The following are the better known titles:

- Tarikh al-Islam al-kabir (تاريخ الإسلام) 'Great History of Islam' (50 vols., in Arabic); Ibn Hajar received it from Abu Hurayra ibn al-Dhahabi; comprising over 30,000 biographical records.
- Siyar A'lam al-Nubala' (سير أعلام النبلاء) ('The Lives of Noble Figures'), 28 volumes, a unique encyclopaedia of biographical history.

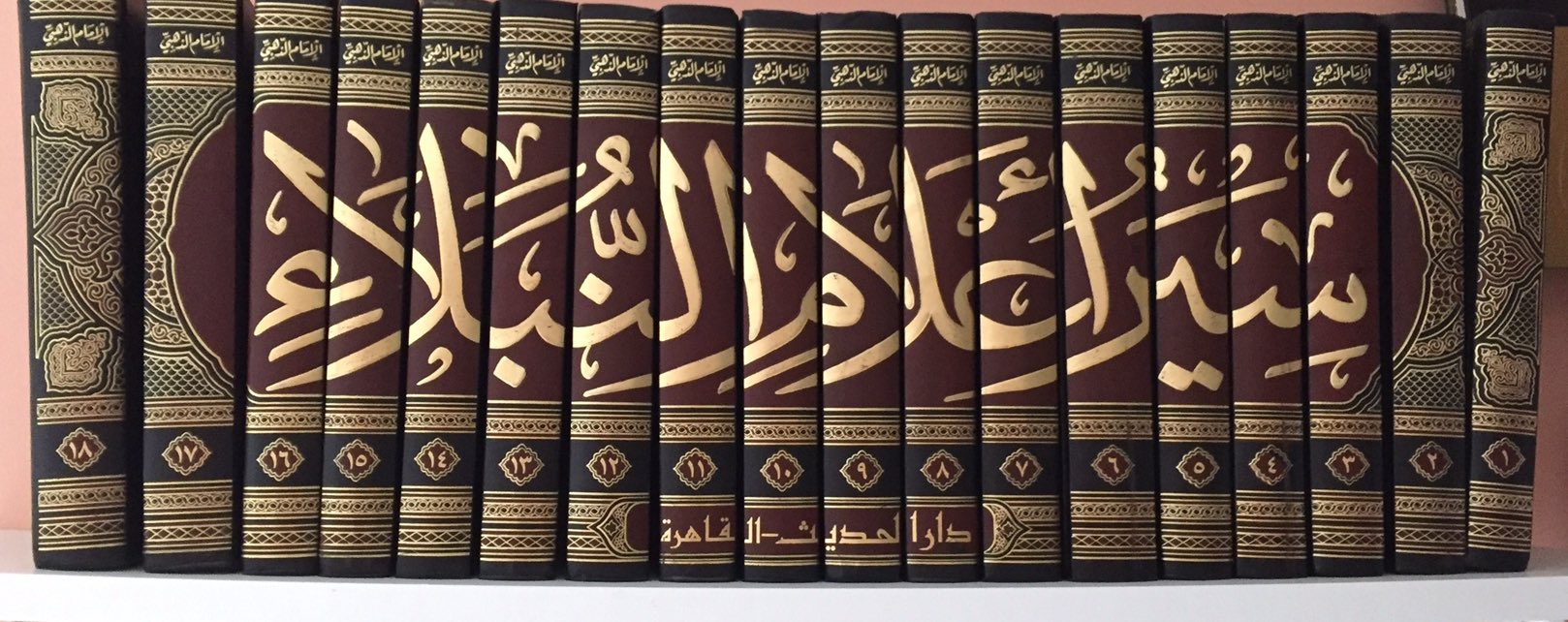
The most famous book of Imam Ad-Dhahabi

- al-'Uluww
- al-Mowqizah
- Al-'Ibar fī khabar man ghabar (العبر في خبر من غبر ويليه ذيول العبر)
- Tadhhib Tahdhib al-Kamal; abridgement of al-Mizzi's abridgement of al-Maqdisi's Al-Kamal fi Asma' al-Rijal, a biographical compendium of hadith narrators from the Six major Hadith collections.
- Al-Kashif fi Ma`rifa Man Lahu Riwaya fi al-Kutub al-Sitta; abridgment of the Tadhhib.
- Al-Mujarrad fi Asma' Rijal al-Kutub al-Sitta; abridgment of the Kashif.
- Mukhtasar Kitab al-Wahm wa al-Iham li Ibn al-Qattan.
- Mukhtasar Sunan al-Bayhaqi; selected edition of Bayhaqi's Sunan al-Kubara.
- Mukhtasar al-Mustadrak li al-Hakim, an abridgement of Hakim's Al-Mustadrak alaa al-Sahihain.
- Al-Amsar Dhawat al-Athar (Cities Rich in Historical Relics); begins with a description of Madina al-Munawwara.
- Al-Tajrid fi Asma' al-Sahaba; dictionary of the Companions of the prophet Muhammad.
- Tadhkirat al-ḥuffāẓ. (The Memorial of the Hadith Masters); chronological history of the biography of hadith masters. Ibn Hajar received it from Abu Hurayra ibn al-Dhahabi.
- Tabaqat al-Qurra (Categories of the Qur'anic Scholars); Biographic anthology.
- Al-Mu`in fi Tabaqat al-Muhaddithin, a compendium of hadith scholars (Muhaddithin).
- Duwal al-Islam (The Islamic Nations); concise political histories of Islamic nations.
- Al-Kaba'ir (Cardinal Sins)
- Manaaqib Al-imam Abu Hanifa wa saahibayhi Abu Yusuf wa Muhammad Ibn al-Hasan (The Honoured status of Imam Abu Hanifa and his two companions, Abu Yusuf and Muhammad ibn Al-Hasan)
- Mizaan-ul-I’tidaal, a reworking of al-Kamil fi Dhu'afa' al-Rijal by Ibn 'Adi al-Jurjani (d. 277 H)

== See also ==
- Islamic scholars
