= History of Nishapur (book) =

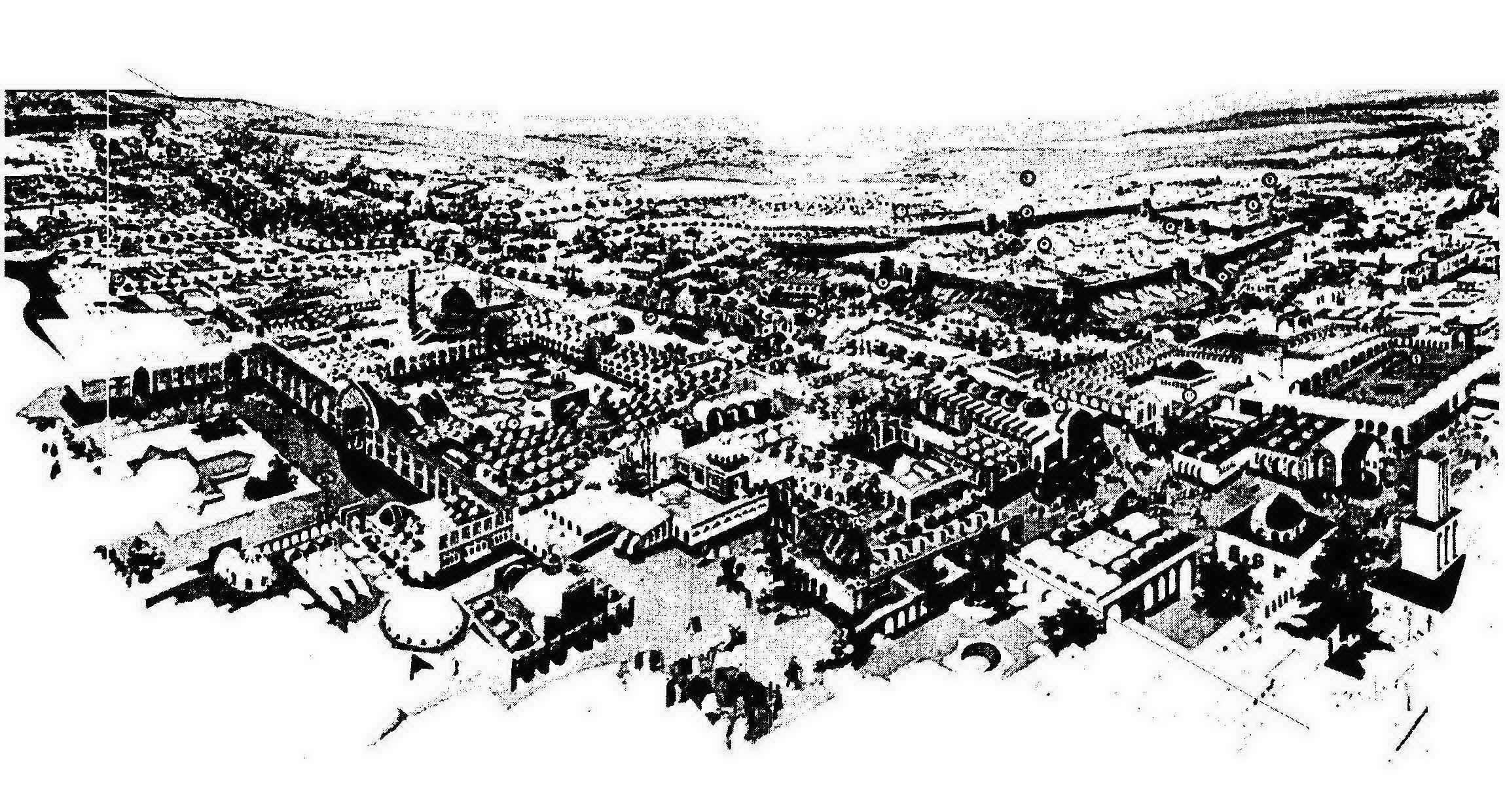
- A modern reconstruction of Nishapur in the Middle Ages shown in the edited version of the book "History of Nishapur" held in the National Library of Iran.
- Editor: Mohammad-Reza Shafiei Kadkani
- Author: Al-Hakim al-Nishapuri
- Translator: محمد بن حسین خلیفه نیشابوری
- Language: Arabic (translated to Persian)
- ISBN: 9789644160202

History of Nishapur is an encyclopedia written in Arabic by Hakim Nishapuri (933 - 1014 CE) for an introduction of the city and the quarter of Nishapur in Khorasan. It also introduces its reader to the scientists and the people of importance in Nishapur of the Middle Ages. Only a small part of it remains and its original version is lost. This book has been translated to Persian by Mohammad Ibn Hossein Khalife Nishapuri (c. 1291-?).
