= Biographical evaluation =

Islamic religious studies to distinguish reliable from unreliable hadith

Biographical evaluation (Arabic: عِلْمُ الرِّجال, romanized: ʿilm al-rijāl; literally meaning 'Knowledge of Men', but more commonly understood as the Science of Narrators) refers to a discipline of Islamic religious studies within hadith terminology in which the narrators of hadith are evaluated. Its goal is to establish the credibility of the narrators, using both historic and religious knowledge, in order to distinguish authentic and reliable hadiths from unreliable hadiths. ʿIlm ar-rijāl is synonymous with what is commonly referred to as al-jarḥ wa al-taʿdīl (discrediting and accrediting) – the criticism and declared acceptance of hadith narrators. (Note: Al-Suyūṭī mentioned in the chapter of Tadrib al-Rawi entitled 'Recognizing the trustworthy, reliable narrators and those who are weak and unreliable': "al-Jarḥ wa al-Taʻdīl is permissible...")

== Significance ==
Ali ibn al-Madini, an early authority on the subject, said, "Knowing the narrators is half of knowledge."

In his Introduction to the Science of Hadith, Ibn al-Salah, a renowned hadith specialist, explained the importance of the study of hadith narrators. Introducing the chapter entitled, 'Recognizing the trustworthy, reliable narrators and those who are weak and unreliable,' Ibn al-Salah said, "This is from the most distinguished and noble types (of hadith study) as it results in recognizing the authenticity of a hadith or its weakness." He then explained that any criticism directed at a narrator was permissible due to the "maintenance of the Shariah, purging it of any mistakes or misinformation".

Stressing the importance of biographical evaluation, Ali ibn al-Madini, an early authority on the subject, said, "Knowing the narrators is half of knowledge." (Note: The other half of knowledge, according to Ibn al-Madini, is "having understanding of the meanings of hadith".)

== History ==
The following Qur'anic verse established a general principal in biographical evaluation: "O you who believe, if a wrongdoer should approach you conveying information, then verify that so as not to fall into ignorance thus regretting what you have done."

=== Time of the Companions ===
While many Companions narrated hadith, according to Ahmad ibn Hanbal there were six who were the most prolific narrators of them, who lived long lives enabling them narrate to a large extent. They were: Abu Huraira, Abdullah ibn Umar, Aisha, Jabir ibn Abdullah, Ibn Abbas and Anas ibn Malik with Abu Huraira being the most prolific of them. According to Ibn al-Salah the most prolific narrators from the Companions was Abu Huraira followed by Ibn Abbas.

In spite of the Companions' efforts in narrating their hadith, there was no need for them to evaluate each other's narrating capabilities or trustworthiness. This is because, as Al-Khatib al-Baghdadi said, that Allah and his Prophet declared the Companions to be upright and trustworthy, and, therefore, there is no need to investigate their reliability, however, one must investigate the condition of those after them. However, there are many established narrations originating from the Companions praising some of the Tabi'un with some criticism of specific individuals from them. and al-Baghdadi's stance is contrary to modern approaches like historical criticism.

=== After the Companions ===
As for the Tabi'un, the generation following the Companions, their praise of narrators was plentiful, while disparagement from them was seldom. Those narrators who were criticized from the Followers were not criticized for fabricating hadith, but, instead, due to heresy, such as the Kharijites, or due to weak memory or due to their condition as narrators being unknown.

Evaluating the narrators of hadith began in the generation following that of the Companions based upon the statement of Muhammad Ibn Sirin, "They did not previously inquire about the isnad. However, after the turmoil occurred they would say, 'Name for us your narrators.' So the people of the Sunnah would have their hadith accepted and the people of innovation would not." The turmoil referred to is the conflicting ideology of the Shias after the passing of the Prophet, and later the Kharijites that had emerged at the time of the third Sunni Caliph Uthman ibn Affan's assassination and the social unrest of the Kharijites in opposition to the succeeding rulers, Ali and Muawiyah. The death of Uthman was in the year 35 after the migration.

In the following generation, Tabi' al-Tabi'in, and afterward, the weak, unacceptable narrators increased in number, necessitating that a group of scholars clarify the condition of the narrators and distinguishing any narrations that were not authentic.

==== Early specialists ====
According to Ibn al-Salah, quoting an early religious authority, the first to specialize in the study of hadith narrators was Shuʿba Ibn al-Ḥajjāj, followed by Yahya ibn Sa'id al-Qattan and then Ahmad ibn Hanbal and Yahya ibn Ma'in. Al-Bulqini added some names to the aforementioned: Ali ibn al-Madini and 'Amr ibn 'Ali al-Fallas, and then mentioned Malik ibn Anas and Hisham ibn Urwah as having preceded them in evaluating narrators.

== Overview ==
The grounds upon which a narrator is subject to criticism are numerous some relating to moral uprightness and others to precision.

=== Narrator criteria ===
A hadith is subject to criticism on the basis of two matters. The first relates to the continuity of the hadith's chain of narration; if there is discontinuity between two or more narrators, that hadith is criticized on this basis as discussed in depth in the hadith terminology article. The second relates to criticism of a narrator, or more, in the chain of narration of a particular hadith.

Hadith narrators are evaluated in light of two qualities in determining the overall grading of a hadith. These qualities are derived from the definition of a hadith that is sahih constituting two of its five conditions. The first, uprightness (al-ʻadālah), is defined as the ability an individual possesses to adhere to moralistic decorum (al-taqwā) and maintaining proper social graces (al-murūʼah). The second, precision (al-ḍabṭ), is of two types, the first is pertaining to memorization and the second to writing. Precision in memorization (ḍabṭ al-ṣadr) refers to the ability to retain the specified information, recalling and conveying it at will. Precision in writing (ḍabṭ al-kitāb) is the preservation of the written information from the time it was heard until its transmission.

=== Grounds for criticism ===
The grounds upon which a narrator is subject to criticism are numerous some relating to moral uprightness and others to precision. Ibn Ḥajr identified and enumerated ten qualities in which a narrator could be criticized. Five relate to trustworthiness and the other five to precision; however, he presented these ten qualities in order according to severity:

1. A narrator intentionally lying, claiming a statement to be a Prophetic hadith when it is not. The inclusion of a narrator of a hadith as such renders that hadith fabricated (Mawḍūʻ).
2. An accusation of fabricating a hadith. This would be due a narration that clearly contradicts established religious principles originating from the direction (as it pertains to that hadith's chain of narration) of that individual. Or, that a narrator is known to lie in his ordinary speech but not while narrating hadith.
3. Plenitude of mistakes in a narrator's hadith.
4. Lack of attention to accuracy.
5. The commission of wrongdoing by statement or action as long as it does not constitute apostasy.
6. Misconception due to narrating on the basis of misunderstanding.
7. Contradiction of that narrator's hadith of another established narrator.
8. Unspecification of that narrator's standing in their narrating capabilities.
9. Heresy, being the belief in an innovated matter that contradicts the established religious practice originating with the Prophet due to a misconception, not obstinateness.
10. Poor memory, differing from number three above in that the mistakes of that narrator outnumber instances in which they are correct.

=== Methods of evaluation ===
Hadith scholars of the past employed various methods by which to evaluate the narrating abilities of a narrator. From these means are the following:

1. Observing that narrator's religiosity and asking others about it.
2. Requesting the narrator in question to narrate from a particular living scholar and then returning to that scholar and comparing his narrations with those of the narrator under examination.
3. If the narrator narrates from a deceased scholar, inquiring when he, the narrator in question, was born, when he met that scholar and where and then comparing the dates provided in his response to the recognized dates of that scholars death and travels. So, perhaps, the dates provided by the narrator may contradict the established dates, for example, claiming that he heard from a particular scholar after the recognized death of that scholar.
4. Comparing the narrations of the narrator with those of narrators of established reliability, comparing them seeking any distinctions that might be unique to that narrator, in particular, while contradicting the others.
5. Examination of the narrations either written or memorized by that narrator after the passage of time observing any discrepancies with their initial narrations.
6. Deliberately altering the wording of a hadith or more for the purpose of examining the ability of the narrator being examined to detect those alterations. This is considered an acceptable practice as long as those alterations are brought to light following the examination process.

== Evaluation terminology ==
A system of terminology developed to codify the standing of each narrator...

As a result of the evaluation of narrators, each scholar would then conclude by describing the standing of each narrator. A system of terminology developed to codify the standing of each narrator, with some variation in usage of terms between the individual evaluators. These are divided into two categories, those terms that constitute praise (taʻdīl) and those that constitute criticism (jarḥ). al-Suyūṭī gathered the various terms and arranged them in order of strength. He quoted four levels of strength for praise from Ibn Abi Hatim and Ibn al-Salah, adding that al-Dhahabi and Abd al-Rahim ibn al-Husain al-'Iraqi added an additional level and Ibn Ḥajr one above that. Thus according to al-Suyūṭī, there are six levels of praise. Similarly, al-Suyūṭī described six levels of terms used to criticize a narrator; he arranged them beginning with the least severe and concluding with the most severe criticism.

=== Levels of praise ===
1. Ibn Ḥajr held that the highest level of praise was expressed was through the use of the superlative, for example, the most established of the people (athbat al-nās), or the most reliable of the people (awthaq al-nās).
2. Al-'Iraqi and al-Dhahabi were of the opinion that the highest level was the repetition of adjective, or adjectives, in praising a narrator. For example, reliably reliable (thiqah thiqah), or reliable, firm (thiqah thabt).
3. The highest level according to Ibn Abi Hatim and Ibn al-Salah the highest is the use of a single adjective in describing a narrator. Examples of this are: reliable (thiqah), precise (mutqin) or firm (thabt).
4. Trustworthy (ṣadūq) and worthy of trust (maḥallahu al-ṣidq) are both examples of the next category to Ibn Abi Hatim and Ibn al-Salah while al-'Iraqi and al-Dhahabi consider the latter term to be from the next level.
5. Next is respectable (shaykh) along with worthy of trust (maḥallahu al-ṣidq) according to some. This level would also be inclusive of an individual accused of heresy.
6. The lowest of the levels of praise is, for example, satisfactory in hadith (ṣāliḥ al-ḥadīth), meaning according to Ibn Ḥajr, this includes acceptable (maqbūl) meaning, when supported by other narrators.

=== Levels of criticism ===
1. The least severe level for the criticism of a narrator is soft in hadith (layyin al-ḥadīth) and, according to al-'Iraqi, they have spoken about him (takallamū fīhi). This level would also be taken into consideration as a corroborating narrator, but at a level less than the lowest level of praise.
2. Next is he is not strong (laysa bi l-qawī). The hadith of a narrator determined to be at this level would also be taken into consideration, as with the previous level, however, this narrator is weaker than one of the previous level.
3. More severe than he is not strong is weak in hadith (ḍaʻīf al-ḥadīth), however, none of these first three categories are rejected outright.
4. The fourth of the levels of severity of criticism includes terms such as: his hadith is rejected (rudd al-ḥadīth) and very weak (ḍaʻīf jiddan).
5. The fifth includes terms such as: his hadith is abandoned (matrūk al-ḥadīth) and destroyed (hālik).
6. From the most severe level of terms of criticism are: compulsive liar (kadhdhāb), he lies (yakdhib) and fabricator (waḍḍāʻ) among other terms.

== Collections of narrator biographies ==
=== Sunni ===
Collections of narrator biographies are sometimes general and sometimes specific to particular categories of narrators. Among the most common of these categories are:

==== General evaluation ====
- The Great History by Muhammad al-Bukhari.
- al-Jarḥ wa al-Taʻdīl by Ibn Abi Hatim.

==== Chronologically ordered ====
===== Particular to a specific period of time =====
Books particular to the Companions:

- The Book of Knowledge about the Companions by Ali ibn al-Madini.
- The Comprehensive Compilation of the Names of the Prophet's Companions by Yusuf ibn abd al-Barr.
- Finding the Truth in Judging the Companinons by Ibn Ḥajr.
- The Lions of the Forest and the knowledge about the Companions by Ali ibn al-Athir.

===== General chronology =====
- Kitab al-`Ilal wa Ma‘rifat al-Rijal: "The Book of Narrations Containing Hidden Flaws and of Knowledge of the Men (of Hadeeth)" by Ahmad ibn Hanbal.
- The Book of the Major Classes by Ibn Sa'd al-Baghdadi.
- Tadhkirat al-huffaz, The Memorial of the Hadith Masters, a chronological history of hadith scholars' biographies by al-Dhahabi.
- Mizan al-Itidal by al-Dhahabi
- Lisan al-Mizan by Ibn Hajar al-Asqalani, a reworking of Mizan al-'Itidal by al-Dhahabi.
- Tahdhib al-Tahdhib by Ibn Hajar al-Asqalani
- Taqrib al-Tahzib by Ibn Hajar al-Asqalani
- Tarikh al-Islam al-kabir (تاريخ الإسلام) 'Great History of Islam' (50 vols., in Arabic); Ibn Hajar received it from Abu Hurayra ibn al-Dhahabi; comprising over 30,000 biographical records.
- Siyar a`lam al-nubala (سير أعلام النبلاء) ('The Lives of Noble Figures') by al-Dhahabi, 28 volumes, a unique encyclopedia of biographical history.

==== Geographically specific ====
- History of Baghdad by Al-Khatib al-Baghdadi.
- History of Damascus by Ibn Asakir.

==== Gender specific ====
- Al-Wafa bi Asma al-Nisa by Akram Nadwi

==== Evaluation of the narrators of specific books ====
- Al-Kamal fi Asma' al-Rijal, by Abd al-Ghani al-Maqdisi, is a collection of the biographies of the narrators of the hadith contained in the Six major Hadith collections.
- Tadhhib Tahdhib al-Kamal by al-Dhahabi; abridgement of al-Mizzi's abridgement of al-Maqdisi's Al-Kamal fi Asma' al-Rijal, a biographical compendium of hadith narrators from the Six major Hadith collections.

=== Shi'i ===
Early Shi'ite rijāl collections include:

- Rijāl al-Barqī ("al-Barqī's Men"), by Aḥmad al-Barqī (died c. 893)
- Ikhtiyār maʿrifat al-rijāl ("The Selection of the Knowledge of the Men"): an abridgement made by Shaykh Tusi (995–1067 CE) from the Rijāl al-Kashshī ("al-Kashshī's Men") by Muhammad ibn Umar al-Kashshi (c. 854–941/951)
- Rijāl al-Najāshī ("al-Najāshī's Men"), by Aḥmad ibn ʿAlī al-Najāshī (c. 982–1058)
- Fihrist kutub al-shīʿa ("The Catalogue of the Books of the Shi'ites"), by Shaykh Tusi (995–1067 CE)
- Rijāl al-Ṭūsī ("al-Ṭūsī's Men"), by Shaykh Tusi (995–1067 CE)
