= Umdat al-Talib =

Genealogy book about Shiite first Imam, Ali

Umdat al-Talib fi Ansab Al Abi Talib
- Author: Ibn Inabah
- Language: Originally Arabic, also translated into Persian
- Subject: Genealogy and biography of the family of Abi Talib
- Genre: Scientific, Genealogy
- Publication date: The first handwritten compilation was completed in 802 AH–1399 AD/CE; The first printed academic version was published in 1380 AH–1960 AD/CE
- Publication place: – The manuscript of the book written in Iraq. – Re-editing, cataloging, and publishing in the modernized form in Iran.
- Media type: The first version was handwritten on paper, and several academic editions were published years later.

Umdat al-Talib fi Ansab Al Abi Talib (Arabic: عُمْدَةُ ألطّالِب فی أنْسابِ آلِ أبي طالب, lit. 'The Seeker's Guide to the Genealogies of the Family of Abi Talib') is a genealogy book written by Ahmad ibn Ali ibn Husayn al-Husayni, known as Ibn Inabah (died 828 AH ‍–‍ 1425 AD/CE), a famous Shiite scholar and noble genealogist of the 9th century AH‍–‍15th century AD/CE.

This book deals with the genealogy of Abu Talib ibn Abd al-Muttalib and the descendants of Ali ibn Abi Talib in details.

== Synopsis ==
"Umdat al-Talib fi Ansabi Ale Abi Talib" (in Arabic: عمدة الطالب فی انساب آل ابی طالب, lit. 'The Seeker's Guide to the Genealogies of the Family of Abi Talib'), is the Ibn Inabah's most important work. This book is of great importance in the science of genealogy in the Islamic sources.

In this book, Ibn Inabah describes the biography of Abu Talib's ancestors and then his descendants. Finally, he describes in more detail the lineage of Ali ibn Abi Talib (the first Shia Imam) through his children in five chapters:

– The first chapter:
- Hasan ibn Ali (the second Shia Imam, the first son of Ali ibn Abi Talib)
– The second chapter:
- Husayn ibn Ali (the third Shia Imam, the second son of Ali ibn Abi Talib)
– The third chapter:
- Muhammad ibn al-Hanafiyya (one of the sons of Ali ibn Abi Talib)
– The fourth chapter:
- Abbas ibn Ali (also known by the kunya "Abu al-Fadl", in Arabic: أَبو الْفَضْل, lit. 'The Father of the Virtue', was a son of Ali ibn Abi Talib)
– The fifth chapter:
- Umar ibn Ali known as "Umar al-Atraf" (in Arabic: عُمَر بن عَلیّ, in Arabic: عمر الاَطرف, one of the children of Ali ibn Abi Talib who accompanied his brother, Husayn ibn Ali, to Karbala and was killed on the day of Ashura)

In the book "Umdat al-Talib fi Ansabi Ale Abi Talib", after a preface, the author lists in a detailed introduction the ancestors of Prophet Abraham (the common Hebrew patriarch of the Abrahamic religions, including Judaism, Christianity, and Islam) and then his children up to Abu Talib ibn Abd al-Muttalib (the leader of Banu Hashim, uncle of the Islamic Prophet Muhammad) known as "Abu Talib" or "Abi Talib". Then Ibn Inabah mentions the children of Abu Talib: Aqil ibn Abi Talib, Ja'far ibn Abi Talib, and Ali ibn Abi Talib (the first Shia Imam, the only successor whom the Prophet Muhammad introduced him clearly in the public, refer to Ghadir Khumm).

After going through these chapters, Ibn Inabah briefly mentions the children and grandchildren of the sons of Abu Talib in several another chapters. Finally, the author Ibn Inabah, describes in more detail the lineage of Ali ibn Abi Talib through his children in five chapters: Hasan ibn Ali (known as "Imam Hassan" in Shia doctrine, the second Shia Imam), Husayn ibn Ali (known as "Imam Hossein" in Shia doctrine, the third Shia Imam), Muhammad ibn al-Hanafiyya, Abbas ibn Ali (known as "Abu al-Fadl", in Arabic: أَبو الْفَضْل, lit. 'The Father of the Virtues', son of Ali ibn Abi Talib, he fought until his last breath to save his elder brother, Husayn ibn Ali, when he was surrounded in Karbala to force him to swear allegiance, so "Abu al-Fadl" was killed on the day of Ashura), and Umar ibn Ali (in Arabic: عُمَر بن عَلیّ, son of Ali ibn Abi Talib who accompanied his brother, Husayn ibn Ali, to Karbala and was killed on the day of Ashura too).

This genealogical report by Ibn Inabah provides brief but useful information about how the Alawi clan spread across its lands and places of residence, which is a suitable guide for historians. Later historians and Hadith scholars such as "Kia Gilani" in the book "Seraj al-Ansab" (in Arabic: سراج الأنساب lit. 'The light-way of genealogy'), Hurr Amili in the book "Amal ol-Aamel" (in Arabic: اَمَلُ الآمِل فی عُلماء جَبَل عامِل lit. 'The Hope of the Hopeful in the Scholars of Jabal Amil'), and Mohammad-Baqer Majlesi known as "Allamah Majlesi" in the book "Bihar al-Anwar" (in Arabic: بِحَار ٱلْأَنْوَار lit. 'The Seas of The Lights'), have greatly benefited from the book "Umdat al-Talib fi Ansabi Ale Abi Talib" by Ibn Inabah.

== About the author ==
"Sayyid Ahmad ibn Ali ibn Al-Hussein ibn Ali ibn Muhanna ibn Inabah" known as "Ibn Inabah" was born in 748 AH–1347 AD/CE, probably in the city of Hillah in Iraq. Ibn Inabah died in the city of Kerman in Iran in the month of Safar 828 AH–January 1425 AD/CE at the age of 77.

According to Ibn Inabah autobiography, his lineage reaches back to Ali ibn Abi Talib (the first Shia Imam) through 20 intermediaries. He is considered a descendant of Abd Allah al-Mahd (an Islamic scholar, theologian and hadith narrator, grandson of both Hasan ibn Ali and Husayn ibn Ali), hence his lineage is "Hassani-Husseini". His relationship is to Hasan ibn Ali (the second Shia Imam) through his father and to Husayn ibn Ali (the third Shia Imam) through his mother.

"Ibn Inabah" was a Shiite historian and genealogist. He was one of the special students of "Ibn Mu'ayyah" (the prominent genealogist and historian). He lived at the same time as Muhammad ibn Makki (known as "Al-Shahid al-Awwal", Arabic: ٱلشَّهِيد ٱلْأَوَّل lit. '"The First Martyr"', a prominent Shia scholar and author, and the first jurist who sacrificed his life and brutally murdered for defending his school, Shia).

From his early youth, "Ibn Inabah" studied genealogy under the supervision of "Abu Abdullah Muhammad ibn Qasim ibn Mu'ayyah Dibaji" (in Arabic: ابوعبدالله‌ محمد بن قاسم بن معیه دیباجی, died 776 AH–1374 AD/CE) known as "Ibn Mu'ayyah" (in Arabic: ابن مُعَيَّه). Ibn Inabah became the beloved and the noble of his master "Ibn Mu'ayyah" among colleagues. During his education, Ibn Inabah benefited from numerous sources and teachers, but he undoubtedly gained the most scientific knowledge from the works of his bold master "Ibn Mu'ayyah". As can be seen from Ibn Inabah circumstances, after the death of his master "Ibn Mu'ayyah", he embarked on a journey of exploration and traveled to Isfahan, Herat, Samarkand, Mecca, and Mazaar (in the Mishan Plain), and benefited from the knowledge of many genealogists.

His most important work is "Umdat al-Talib fi Ansabi Ale Abi Talib" (in Arabic: عمدة الطالب فی انساب آل ابی طالب, lit. 'The Seeker's Guide to the Genealogies of the Family of Abi Talib') which is written in Arabic language. In this book, Ibn Inabah describes the biography of Abu Talib ibn Abd al-Muttalib's ancestors and then his descendants. Finally, he describes the descendants of Ali ibn Abi Talib with more detail.

As can be seen from "Ibn Inabah's" writings, he was a trusted and reliable person in transmitting authentic documents and Hadiths (a form of Islamic oral tradition containing the sayings, actions, and approvals of the prophet Muhammad or his progeny, specially descendants of Ali, the twelve Imams in Twelver Shia) of Imams from the previous generation to the newer generation. This reputation has made his books very practical in the Shiite religion. His book "Umdat al-Talib fi Ansabi Ale Abi Talib" (Arabic: عُمْدَةُ ألطّالِب فی أنْسابِ آلِ أبی‌طالب, lit. 'The Seeker's Guide to the Genealogies of the Family of Abi Talib') is one of the basic books on the Shiite Imams genealogy in Islamic scholarly circles. The authenticity and purity of Hadiths are determined by the people who transmit them. In narrating Hadiths and transmitting pure Islamic knowledge, "Ibn Inabah" took his method from his prominent master "Ibn Mu'ayyah" (has a strong reputation among colleagues and was a highly trusted Hadith narrator and transmitter of the time) and then in the root, a reliable source that scholars use to verify Hadiths, "Ibn Inabah" reached out to al-Allama al-Hilli (one of the few purest narrator and transmitters, one of the most influential Twelver Shi'i Muslim authors of all time).

"Ibn Inabah's" sect is not very clear in the historical reports and evidences, and there are disagreements among scholars over his school of thoughts. There is some evidence that he was either a Zaydi or a Twelver Shia. Some have doubted whether he is a Shiite. But this seems to be incorrect, although it is not certain that he was a Twelver Shia. However, most likely, "Ibn Inabah" was either a Zaydi or a Twelver Shiite.

Ibn Inabah has written several other books too. Some of these works include "Al-Fosul al-Fakhriyah fi Usul al-Bariyah" (in Arabic: الفصول‌ الفخریة فی‌ اصول‌ البریة, lit. 'Honorary Chapters in the Principles of Creation'), "Al-Tohfat al-Jalaaliate fi Ansabi al-Talibiyyah" (in Arabic: التحفة الجلالیة فی‌ انساب‌ الطالبیة, lit. 'The Aesthetic Masterpiece in the Lineages of the Talibiyyah'), "Bahr al-Ansab fi Nasabi Bani Hashim" (in Arabic: بحر الانساب‌ فی‌ نسب‌ بنی‌ هاشم‌, lit. 'The Base of Genealogies in the Lineage of Bani Hashim'), "Risalah fi Usul Shajarat al-Sadah Ale Abi Alawi" (in Arabic: رسالة فی‌ اصول‌ شجرة السادة آل‌ ابی‌ علوی‌, lit. 'A Note on the Origins of the Family Tree of the Nobles of the Family of Abi Alawi') and “Ansabi Ale Abi Talib” (in Arabic: انساب‌ آل‌ ابی‌ طالب‌, lit. 'Genealogy of the Family of Abi Talib').

== Editions ==
Ibn Inabah has written the book "Umdat al-Talib fi Ansabi Ale Abi Talib" (Arabic: عُمْدَةُ ألطّالِب فی أنْسابِ آلِ أبی‌طالب, lit. 'The Seeker's Guide to the Genealogies of the Family of Abi Talib') three times in different volumes and editions as follows:

The first edition
The first edition, which is the most comprehensive version, but it is disorganized. It is possibly written in 802 AH‍–‍1399 AD/CE. It is known as the "Umdat al-Talib Timuri" (with the suffix "Timuri" due to its dedication to the emperor of the time, Timur Gurkani). At the beginning of the book, the author says that he has adopted most of the content from the concise book written by his teacher, "Ibn Sufi", and from another book written by "Sheikh Abu Nasr al-Sahl ibn Abdullah al-Bukhari" and that he has also added some points from other sources.
The second edition
The second edition is known as "Umdat al-Talib Jalali" (with the suffix "Jalali" due to its dedication to the twenty-fifth Nizari Isma'ili Imam, Jalaluddin Hassan), and the author, Ibn Inabah, compiled it in 812 AH‍–‍1409 AD/CE by selecting about two-thirds of the first edition and adding an introduction. The author organized this edition with an introduction and three chapters. Each chapter has divided into several sections.
The third edition
Ibn Inabah prepared the third edition for Sultan Muhammad ibn Falah Musha'sha'ie (an Iraqi-born theologian who founded the Musha'sha'iya, a Shia sect, the living ancestor of Sadat and the ruler of "Huwayzah" at the time) and finished writing it on 10 Safar 827 AH‍–‍22 January 1424 AD/CE.

Shahab ud-Din Mar'ashi Najafi (an Iraqi Shia Grand Ayatollah and Marja') called the three editions as follows: The first edition as "Kubra" (lit. 'the big'), the second edition as "Wusta" (lit. 'the middle') and the third edition as "Sughra" (lit. 'the small') respectively.

== Structure ==
In the original manuscript of "Umdat al-Talib fi Ansabi Ale Abi Talib", the text of the book is rich and full of information, but it does not follow a specific order. In the book, the information is presented one after the other in a narrative manner. The divisions and chapters of the book "Umdat al-Talib fi Ansabi Ale Abi Talib" are not clear and informative, and in order to find a person or his\her lineage, one must search its contents sufficiently. For example, to finding the description of descendants and lineage of an Imam, the audience may have to examine a great deal of detail and needs to extensively search around them. Finding a specific lineage and progeny in this book takes a considerable amount of time. In the such valuable genealogical descriptions, the book subject may move from ancient classes to very distant generations and suddenly return to the original ancestors and the discussion becomes prolonged and from old generations goes back to far before that to their ancient ancestors. The classification of the original handwritten version of the book is traditional and abstruse. The author does not cite all of his sources, but in some cases he mentions the name of the narrator or the book from which he quoted a specific matter.

The fame of the book "Umdat al-Talib fi Ansabi Ale Abi Talib" is due to the rare information it provides on the subject of genealogical examination of the Fourteen Infallibles (The Fourteen Infallibles are the Islamic prophet Muhammad, his daughter Fatima, and the Twelve Imams).

== Motivation for writing ==
Because Ibn Inabah traveled to different regions, he saw people claiming to be Alawi (the descendant of Ali the first Shia Imam called Alids or Alawis) and no one identified or denied it, because they were not aware of the lineage of the Alids; Therefore, he wrote the book "Umdat al-Talib fi Ansabi Ale Abi Talib" to explain the principles and branches of the sacred lineage of Alids. In the preface to the first two editions of "Umdat al-Talib" (in Arabic: عُمْدَةُ ألطّالِب, lit. 'The Seeker's Guide'), Ibn Inabah says that he wrote this book because a group of people doubted the genealogy of the family of Abi Talib.

== Time of publication ==
The first handwritten compilation was probably completed in 802 AH–1399 AD/CE in Iraq by its author, Ibn Inabah. The first printed academic version was probably published in 1380 AH‍–‍1960 AD/CE in Iran.

== See also ==
- Al-Majdi fi Ansab al-Talibiyyin
- Alids
- The Fourteen Infallibles
- Family tree of Muhammad
- Kashf al-Ghumma
- Bihar al-Anwar
- Du'a' Kumayl
- Aban ibn Abi Ayyash
- Abu Basir al-Asadi
- Al-Urwah al-Wuthqa
- Abu Basir al-Moradi
- Ibn Khaldun
- Al-Zubayr ibn Bakkar
- Encyclopaedia of Shia
- Encyclopedia of Imam Ali
- Mirza Muhammad al-Akhbari
- Hisham ibn al-Hakam
