= Al-Sayyid al-Tanukhi =

Theologian

Al-Amir al-Sayyid Jamal al-Din 'Abdalla al-Tanukhi (May 1417 – September 1479) was a Druze theologian and commentator. He has been described as "the most deeply revered individual in Druze history after the hudud who founded and propagated the faith." He is mostly famous for writing many books referred to as "al sharh" or الشرح in Arabic which means "the explanation." As their title suggests, these books are a deep explanation of the Epistles of Wisdom. His tomb in Aabey, Lebanon is a site of pilgrimage for the Druze. He is credited with establishing a council of Initiates which brought together the Druze of the Chouf mountains.

== See also ==
- Ibn Duqmaq
- Ignatius Noah of Lebanon
- Abu'l-Hasan Bayhaqi
- Ali ibn Makula
- Ma'mar ibn al-Muthanna
- Muhammad ibn Habib al-Baghdadi
