= Al-Nijat =

Book on old philosophy by Avicenna

- Author: Avicenna
- Original title: النجاة من الغرق فى بحر الضلالات
- Language: Arabic
- Subject: Philosophy; Logic; Physics; Mathematics; Theology

Al-Nijat min al-Qarq fi Bahr al-Zalalaat (Arabic: النجاة من الغرق في بحر الضلالات, transl. salvation from falling into the sea of misguidances) known as Al-Nijat is one of the most famous philosophical works of the Persian philosopher Avicenna (ibn Sīnā, 980-1037). The general theme of the book is philosophy and includes topics in the fields of logic, physics, mathematics and theology.

== Epistemology and approach ==
The book "Al-Nijat min al-Qarq fi Bahr al-Zalalaat" written in Arabic and includes a course of theoretical philosophy (logic, physics, mathematics and theology). According to some researchers, "Al-Nijat" is a selection from The Book of Healing. The great similarity of the book of "Al-Nijat" to The Book of Healing in the order of the chapters and in the content is the reason for these opinions. Some points can be considered about this view:

- Avicenna's introduction at the beginning of the book of "Al-Nijat" contains the point that his purpose is not to write summaries, but the goal is to write the minimum things that should be known.
- Avicenna's definitions and expressions in the book of "Al-Nijat" are close to his definitions and expressions in the Book of Healing.
- The order of the chapters and topics discussed in the book of "Al-Nijat" corresponds step by step to the "book of healing". Of course, in some cases, there has been a shift and the topics have become more accurate than in the "book of healing".

The headings are arranged this way:

- "Al-Nijat min al-Qarq fi Bahr al-Zalalaat"
  - Logic
    - with 149 chapters
  - Physics
    - with 6 articles (46 chapters in total)
  - Mathematics
    - with 29 titles and chapters
  - Theology
    - with 2 articles (total with 62 chapters)

== Content ==
=== Logic ===
The logic section of the book "Al-Nijat min al-Qarq fi Bahr al-Zalalaat" is very similar in definitions and titles to the logic section of The Book of Healing, and from this point of view "Al-Nijat" is an excerpt from it. But the ease and clarity of the definitions, the expression based on division, the avoidance of prolongation of the word, and the omission and displacement of some issues, have made "Al-Nijat" in these respects both superior to the extensive book of healing and more valuable than the excerpt book of "Oyoun al-Hikma" of Avicenna. Some of the topics in the logic section of the book are:

- Perception and affirmation
- The benefit of logic
- Types of particles
- Intrinsic and transversal
- Theorem and its types
- Material of theorems
- Directions, inversion, analogy and its types
- Trilogy forms
- Induction, allegory, argument and its types and preliminaries

=== Physics ===
Avicenna's purpose in writing the physics sections was to establish a scientific style for future generations, but he did not necessarily include the latest scientific material in it. Although Avicenna was a follower of Aristotle in meteorology and he himself acknowledged it, he did not follow Aristotle's views in cases where a new and appropriate theory seemed to him or he himself reached a different conclusion. Avicenna on various aspects of geophysics, meteorology and atmospheric effects, including the formation of mountains, groundwater, earthquakes, mining, clouds, rain, water vapor, dew, snow, hail, halo, sunbow, wind (origin, types, quantity, temperature, power, rainfall, effects, duration, direction, etc.), thunder, lightning, comet and meteor. Some of the topics of the physics section are:

- Motion and related issues
- Time, place, finite and infinite and related issues
- The unity of the universe and the impossibility of its multiplicity
- The effects of heat and cold on objects
- The ego and related issues

=== Mathematics ===
In mathematics, Avicenna studied and analyzed the principles of Euclid, but did not elaborate and stated only what was necessary to understand the theorems and prove them in order to acquaint the learner with the basics of geometry as soon as possible. Avicenna has also dedicated section 7 of the book of "Al-Nijat" to geometry. Avicenna openly considered music to be mathematics. He has also dealt with shapes, their properties and performances. Avicenna's theories on mathematics have not yet been fully explored, but Karl Lukuc has examined part of his mathematics (flat geometry) in his book "Avicenna as a Mathematician". Some of the topics in mathematics section are:

- Rules about sides, angles and triangles
- Rules about the proportion of surfaces
- Relations and guilds and their properties
- Quality of extraction of the size of the mass of the earth and the moon and the sun relative to each other
- Cognition of observation and the quality of observing
- Tunes, sounds, materials, instruments, improvements, etc.

=== Theology ===
Avicenna begins the issue of knowing existence from the very concept of "being and existence". According to him, existence and existent are the most obvious concepts and no explanation can be given about existence or existent except their name. "Existence can not be described except by its name, it is the first source of any description, so there is not a description for it, but its form is immediately placed in the mind (ego)." In Avicenna's ontology, not all beings have the same concept of existence, but some are more deserving and worthy in this sense than others. Thus beings are in order. Avicenna says in this regard:

The most suitable things for existence are essences, then the objects, and the essences that are not in matters are the most suitable essences for existence, except the first matter (first hyle); Because these essences are threefold: matter, form and separated, which is neither a matter nor a part of the matter and its existence is inevitable, because the matter and its components are caused and existence of man finally reaches a essence which is a discontinuous cause (to matter), but completely separate. So the first beings in merit for existence are the essence of discontinuous separation from the matter, then the form, then matter, and although this is a cause for the matter, it is not a cause of existence, but a receptive (place) for the attainment of existence. The matter has a hyle and in addition has a face that is more complete than a hyle. After these comes the accident; And in each of these classes, a number of beings are found who are different in existence. Some of the topics of the theology section are:

- The concurrence of coexistence with the existing
- Intrinsic and exotic indications
- The reason for the need for the possible to the self-existent is for its possibility not for its occurrence
- The vastness of the self-existent and the fact that it is complete and there are no expected states in it
- The proof of the self-existent
- Resurrection
- Inspirations
- Answered prayers
- Heavenly retributions
- Prophecy
- Worship and its benefits in this world and the hereafter

== Explanations ==
The book Al-Nijat has several explanations such as:

- Explanation of Mulla Sadra
- Explanation of Fakhr al-Din Esfarayeni

== Publication ==
The book Al-Nijat min al-Qarq fi Bahr al-Zalalaat, first published in Cairo by Mohyeddin Sabori al-Kordi in 1913 and secondly in 1938. Also Al-Nijat has been edited by Mohammad Taqi Danesh Pajouh in 1985, published by University of Tehran Press in Iran. This version has an introduction in Persian written by Danesh Pajouh which describes subjects in detail. Then there are pictures of the Arabic manuscript of the book, then the text of book in Arabic. The "Theology" section was translated into English by Nematullah Karamollahi and published in Rome in 1926. The English translation of the "Ego" (psychology) section was also published by Fazlur Rahman Malik in his book "Avicenna's Psychology", first published in 1952 and secondly in 1981 in London.

== See also ==
- The Canon of Medicine
- The Principles of Philosophy and the Method of Realism
- Tariq ut-tahqiq
- Makhzan ol-Asrar
- Ibn Inabah
