= Ibn Inabah =

Shiite historian and genealogist

- اِبْن‌ِ عِنَبه‌

Personal life
- Born: 748 AH; 1347 AD/CE Hillah, Iraq
- Died: 828 AH; 1425 AD/CE (aged 77) Kerman, Iran
- Parent(s): Abd Allah al-Mahd, Inaba ibn Muhammad Wared (Inaba Akbar)
- Era: 9th century AH - 15th century AD/CE
- Notable work: Umdat al-Talib fi Ansab Al Abi Talib "عمدة الطالب فی أنساب آل أبي طالب"
- Education: Traditional genealogist
- Occupation: Historian; Genealogist
- Relatives: Muhammad ibn Dawood ibn Mousa al-Thani

Religious life
- Religion: Islam
- Denomination: Shia

Sayyid Jamal al-Din Ahmad ibn Ali ibn Hussein ibn Muhanna al-Hassani al-Husseini (Arabic: سید جمال‌ الدین‌ أحمد بن‌ علي بن‌ حسین‌ بن مهنا الحسني الحسيني) (born 748 AH, 1347 AD/CE - died 828 AH, 1425 AD/CE), commonly known as Ibn Inabah (Arabic: اِبْن‌ِ عِنَبه‌) was a Shiite historian and genealogist. He is from the clan of Alawi Sayyids and his genealogy is related to Hasan ibn Ali through his father and to Husayn ibn Ali through his mother. He was called Ibn Inabah because "Inabah Asghar" (Arabic: عنبه أصغر) was in his lineage. Although his affiliations has been disputed, some claim that he was a Zaydi while others claim he was a Twelver.

His most important work is "Umdat al-Talib fi Ansabi Al Abi Talib" (Arabic: عمدة الطالب فی أنساب آل أبي طالب, lit. 'The Seeker's Guide to the Genealogies of the Family of Abi Talib') which is written in Arabic language. In this book, Ibn Inabah describes the biography of Abu Talib ibn Abd al-Muttalib's ancestors and then his descendants. Finally, he describes in more detail the descendants of Ali ibn Abi Talib, through his children: Hasan ibn Ali, Husayn ibn Ali, Muhammad ibn al-Hanafiyya, Abbas ibn Ali, and Umar ibn Ali, in five chapters.

== Life and lineage ==
Ahmad ibn Ali ibn Al-Hussein ibn Ali ibn Muhanna ibn Inabah known as Ibn Inabah was born in 748 AH - 1347 AD/CE. Ibn Inabah passed away in the city of Kerman in Iran in the month of Safar 828 AH - January 1425 AD/CE at the age of 77.

Ibn Inabah was probably born in Hillah, Iraq. According to his autobiography, his lineage reaches back to Ali ibn Abi Talib through 20 intermediaries. He is considered a descendant of Abd Allah al-Mahd, hence his lineage goes back to Hasan ibn Ali and Husayn ibn Ali. His relationship is to Hasan ibn Ali through his father and Husayn ibn Ali through his mother, and this is why Ibn Inabah is sometimes called "Hassani" and sometimes "Husseini". He is also called "Dawoodi" because Muhammad ibn Dawood ibn Mousa al-Thani was one of his ancestors.

== Name ==
His fame as Ibn Inabah is due to the fact that his grandfather was called "Inabah Asghar" (Arabic: عنبه أصغر), who in turn was a descendant of "Inaba ibn Muhammad Wared" (Arabic: عنبة بن محمد وارد). "Inabah Akbar" (Arabic: عنبه اکبر) was the ancestor of a tribe of "Bani al-Hassan" nobles who lived in Iraq, around Hillah city.

== Teachers ==
From his early youth, Ibn Inabah studied genealogy under the supervision of "Abu Abdullah Muhammad ibn Qasim ibn Mu'ayyah Dibaji" (Arabic: أبو عبدالله‌ محمد بن قاسم بن معیه ديباجي, died 776 AH - 1374 AD/CE) known as "Ibn Mu'ayyah" (Arabic: ابن مُعَيَّه). Ibn Inabah became the beloved and the noble of his master "Ibn Mu'ayyah" among colleagues. During his education, Ibn Inabah benefited from numerous sources and teachers, but he undoubtedly gained the most scientific knowledge from the works of his bold master "Ibn Mu'ayyah". As can be seen from Ibn Inabah circumstances, after the death of his master "Ibn Mu'ayyah", he embarked on a journey of exploration and traveled to Isfahan, Herat, Samarkand, Mecca, and Mazaar (in the Mishan Plain), and benefited from the knowledge of many genealogists.

Ibn Inabah can be considered to be on the same level with Muhammad ibn Makki (known as "First Martyr", Arabic: الشهيد الأول, a famous jurist who sacrificed his life for his religion). Both of these individuals were engaged in narrating and transmitting hadiths through "Ibn Mu'ayyah" from al-Allama al-Hilli (one of the most influential Twelver Shi'i Muslim authors of all time).

== Views ==
Ibn Inabah's affiliation is not very clear in the history, and several opinions have been expressed on this matter. Some have doubted whether he is a Shiite or not. But this seems to be incorrect, although it is not certain that he was a Twelver Shia.

=== Zaydi ===
Some have considered Ibn Inabah a Zaydi (one of the three main branches of Shia Islam), because his expressions and his references confirm that he was a member of Zaydism sect. For example, Ibn Inabah says about Muhammad al-Mahdi: "There is a twelfth Imam according to the Imamiyyah, and he is the awaited Mahdi according to them." In the preface to "Umdat al-Talib Timuri" (the same book "Umdat al-Talib fi Ansabi Ale Abi Talib" by Ibn Inabah which was dedicated to the then emperor, Timur), where Ibn Inabah speaks about the qualities of Amir Timur Gurkani, he praises Ibn Inabah in the following words: "... the owner of the sublime kingdoms, possessing the prophetic knowledge, the truthful eloquence, the noble verifier with immunity, the luminous generosity, and the approved enthusiasm...". These reasons are used as evidence that he was a Zaydi by supporters of that view.

=== Twelver ===
Some have also considered Ibn Inabah an Twelver Shia and believe that the possibility of him being both a Shia and an Twelver is more acceptable. Especially since Ibn Inabah was the student and son-in-law of the Shiite scholar, Ibn Mu'ayyah, and spent the first part of his life in his service, benefiting from his knowledge, and always remaining loyal to his master.

== Works ==
The surviving works or those attributed to Ibn Inabah are all in the field of genealogy and are of great value and credibility.

=== Umdat al-Talib ===
"Umdat al-Talib fi Ansabi Ale Abi Talib" (in Arabic: عمدة الطالب فی انساب آل ابی طالب, lit. 'The Seeker's Guide to the Genealogies of the Family of Abi Talib'), is the Ibn Inabah's most important work. This book is of great importance in the science of genealogy. Ibn Inabah has written this work 3 times in different volumes. The first edition, which is the most detailed but irregular, is known as the "Umdat al-Talib Timuri" (with the suffix "Timuri" due to its dedication to the emperor of the time, Timur Gurkani). The second edition is known as "Umdat al-Talib Jalali" (with the suffix "Jalali" due to its dedication to the 25th Nizari Isma'ili Imam, Jalaluddin Hassan), and the author, Ibn Inabah, compiled it in 812 AH - 1409 AD/CE by selecting about two-thirds of the first edition and adding an introduction. Ibn Inabah prepared the third edition for Sultan Muhammad ibn Falah Musha'sha'ie (an Iraqi-born theologian who founded the Musha'sha'iya, a Shia sect, the living ancestor of Sadat and the ruler of "Huwayzah" at the time) and finished writing it on 10 Safar 827 AH - 22 January 1424 AD/CE.

In the preface to the first two editions, Ibn Inabah says that he wrote this book because a group of people doubted the genealogy of the family of Abi Talib. In this book, Ibn Inabah describes the biography of Abu Talib's ancestors and then his descendants. Finally, he describes in more detail the lineage of Ali ibn Abi Talib (the first Shia Imam) through his children: Hasan ibn Ali (the second Shia Imam), Husayn ibn Ali (the third Shia Imam), Muhammad ibn al-Hanafiyya, Abbas ibn Ali (also known by the kunya Abu al-Fadl, in Arabic: أَبو الْفَضْل, lit. 'The Father of the Virtue', was a son of Ali ibn Abi Talib), and Umar ibn Ali (in Arabic: عُمَر بن عَلیّ, one of the children of Ali ibn Abi Talib who accompanied his brother, Husayn ibn Ali, to Karbala and was killed on the day of Ashura) in five chapters.

=== Al-Fosul al-Fakhriyah ===
Ibn Inabah's another book, "Al-Fosul al-Fakhriyah fi Usul al-Bariyah" (in Arabic: الفصول‌ الفخریة فی‌ اصول‌ البریة, lit. 'Honorary Chapters in the Principles of Creation'), is in Persian language and was published in Tehran in 1346 SH - 1967 AD/CE with the efforts of "Jalaluddin Hosseini Mohaddes Armavi". This book briefly describes the lineage from Adam to Noah.

This book has an introduction and 3 chapters, the title of the introduction is "On the Explanation of the Origin of Generation". In this book, the human lineage from Adam to Noah is briefly described, then Noah's descendants are followed in greater detail and with clearer classification, and the descendants of each of Noah's descendants are mentioned, especially the kings of Mesopotamia, Iran, and other places. The scope of this genealogy extends to the Arab tribes and the ancestors of the Prophet "Muhammad" and is linked to Abu Talib, and finally the children of Abu Talib are examined and arranged in the style and context of the main author, like the edition "Jalali Umdat al-Talib". In this book, Ibn Inabah sometimes criticizes the opinions of others.

Ibn Inabah wrote this book for "Fakhruddin Hassan ibn Shamsuddin Muhammad", who was a famous scholar in Sabzevar, a descendant of Imam Ali al-Sajjad (also known as "Zayn al-Abidin", in Arabic: زين العابدين, lit. 'The Ornament of the Worshippers', was the great-grandson of the Islamic prophet Muhammad, and the fourth imam in Shia Islam), succeeding his father, Husayn ibn Ali (the third Shia Imam), his uncle, Hasan ibn Ali (the second Imam in Shia), and his grandfather, Ali ibn Abi Talib (the first Imam in Shia).

=== Other works ===
Other works by Ibn Inabah, manuscripts of which are available, are as follows:

1. "Bahr al-Ansab fi Nasabi Bani Hashim" (in Arabic: بحر الأنساب‌ فی‌ نسب‌ بني هاشم‌, lit. 'The Base of Genealogies in the Lineage of Bani Hashim'), in Arabic, is available at the Astan Quds Razavi, the Dar el-Kotob in Egypt, the Institute of Arabic Manuscripts, and the "Hakim Library" in Najaf.
2. "Al-Tohfat al-Jalaaliate fi Ansabi al-Talibiyyah" (in Arabic: التحفة الجلالیة في أنساب‌ الطالبیة, lit. 'The Aesthetic Masterpiece in the Lineages of the Talibiyyah'), in Persian, a copy of which is available in the Mar'ashi Najafi Library in Qom.
3. Khayr al-Din al-Zirikli (a Syrian historian) also mentions a handwritten book entitled "Risalah fi Usul Shajarat al-Sadah Ale Abi Alawi" (in Arabic: رسالة فی‌ أصول‌ شجرة السادة آل‌ ابي علوی‌, lit. 'A Note on the Origins of the Family Tree of the Nobles of the Family of Abi Alawi') authored by Ibn Inabah.
4. Agha Bozorg Tehrani attributed another book entitled “Ansabi Ale Abi Talib” (in Arabic: أنساب‌ آل‌ ابي طالب‌, lit. 'Genealogy of the Family of Abi Talib') to Ibn Inabah and suggested that this book is a translation of "Umdat al-Talib" with minor changes.

== See also ==
- Al-Zubayr ibn Bakkar
- Al-Maqrizi
- Ibn Duqmaq
- Ignatius Noah of Lebanon
- Abu'l-Hasan Bayhaqi
- Ali ibn Makula
- Muhammad ibn Habib al-Baghdadi
- Ibn Sufi
