= On the Science of the Pulse =

On the Science of the Pulse (Persian: اندر دانش رگ Andar dāneš-e rag, also known as Resāla-ye nabż) is a Persian medical book written by Abū Alī ibn Sīnā (Avicenna). It is one of the author's only two books in Persian language.

== Subject matter ==
The book is skillfully organized into nine chapters. The first three provide a general view of the functions of the human body as prologue to the main subject, being the study of the pulse. The following three chapters deal with the pulse. Chapters 7 and 8 summarize ideas about the pulse from The Canon of Medicine. The final chapter closes the book with complementary remarks on the relevant parts in The Canon of Medicine.

== Intended audience ==
Unlike his Arabic works, Avicenna intended this book for general readership, thus composing it in the vernacular.
