= Makhzan ol-Asrar =

Persian poem book from 12th century by Nizami Ganjavi

- by Nizami Ganjavi
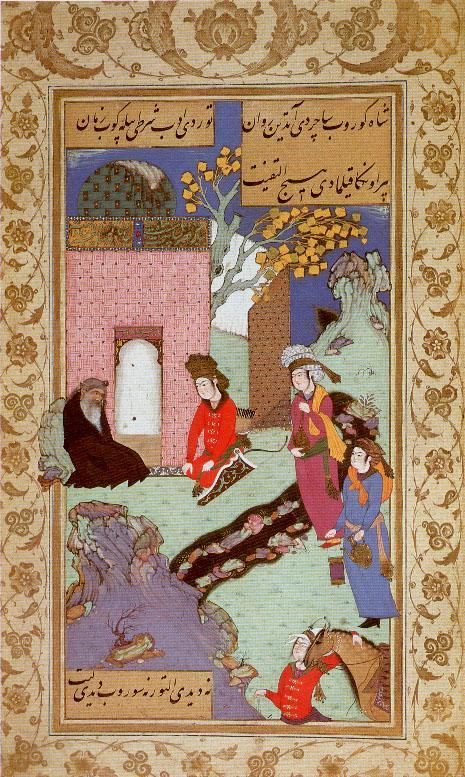
- Miniature from an illustrated manuscript of Makhzan ol-Asrar, depicting a visit to a dervish
- Original title: مخزن‌الاسرار
- Translator: Gholam H. Darab
- Language: Persian
- Subjects: self-knowledge; theology; mysticism
- Publication date: 12th century

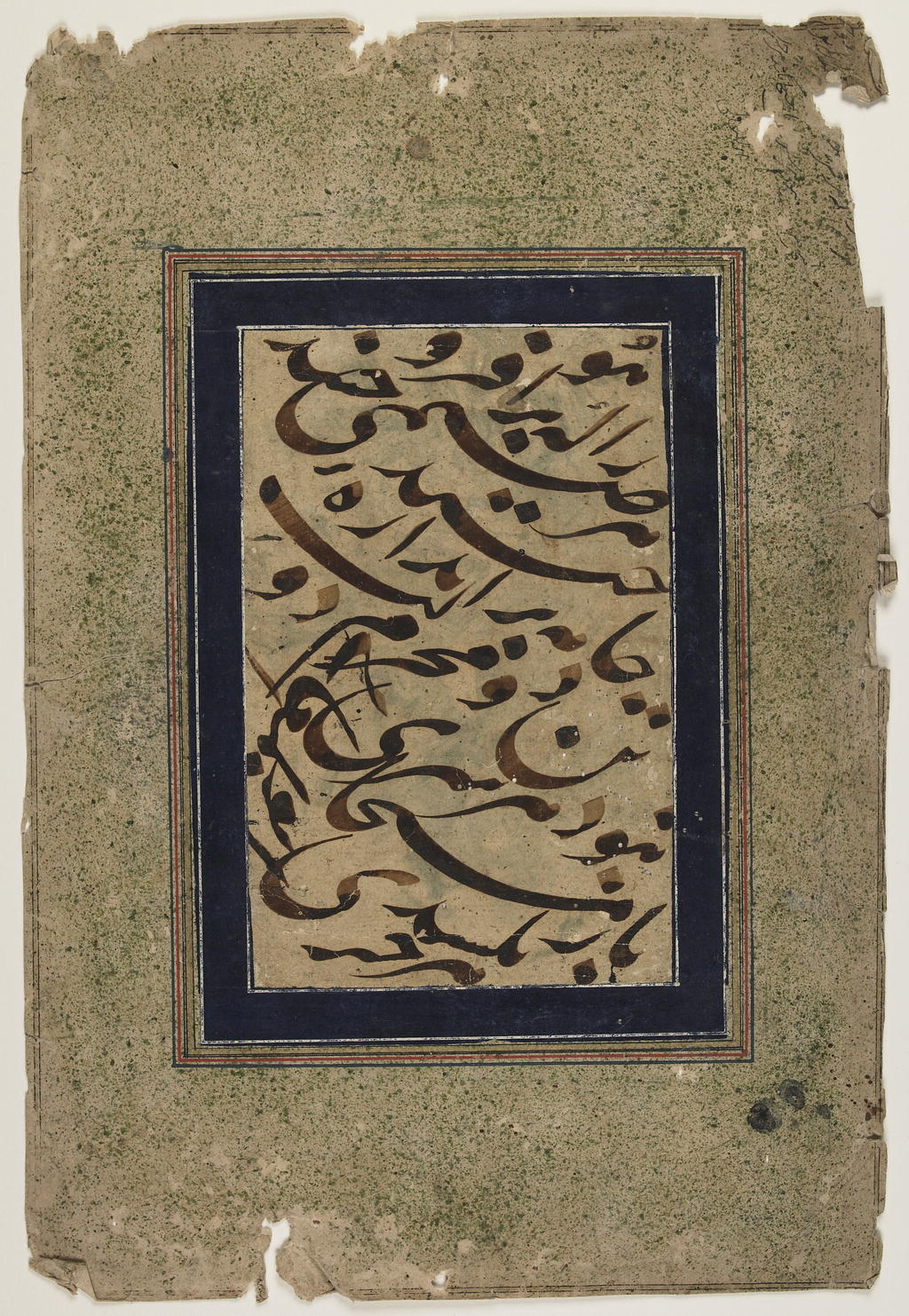
A calligraphic page from Makhzan ol-Asrar by Nizami Ganjavi in Nastaliq script.

Makhzan ol-Asrar or Makhzan al-Asrar (Persian: مخزن‌الاسرار, lit. 'The treasury of mysteries') is a famous mathnawi poem by the Persian poet Nizami Ganjavi (1141–1209). It is the first of Nizami's five long poems known collectively as the Khamsa. It is a didactic and philosophical work consisting of about 2,250 Persian distichs. It was completed when Nizami was forty years old, and since then it has been considered one of the most important poetic and written works in Persian literature.

== Plot ==
The main purpose of the book Makhzan ol-Asrar is to invite people to self-knowledge, theology and choosing good habits and behavior. The poem begins with the traditional invocation of the name of God (basmala):

Original Persian

بسم الله الرحمن الرحیم
هست کلید در گنج حکیم

Transliteration

bi-smi llāhi r-rahmāni r-rahīm
hast kalīd-i dar-i ganj-i hakīm

English translation

In the name of God, the Most Gracious, the Most Merciful,
It (the phrase / the name of God) is the key to the treasury of The Wise.

After this, the author points to one of the main principles of mysticism and Sufism: the unity of God's existence and his obligatory existence. Makhzan ol-Asrar is full of mystical points and advice that are presented to the audience in the form of lyrical stories.

According to scholar Hamidreza Shayeganfar, the main themes of the Makhzan ol-Asrar can be categorized as follows: first, about human neglect in the world; second, about the unreliability and instability of the world; third, about man's relationship with God; fourth, about social issues; and finally, about politics and government.

Nizami says that when he wanted to compose Makhzan ol-Asrar, the archangel told him "you want to write poetry for people, so you should know what you want to sing. Therefore, refine yourself with your heart and follow your heart so that you can build yourself". Then Nizami says that I followed archangel's words and followed "the heart preceptor". From then on, he talks about the nights when he meditated with his heart. Those verses are very complex and beautiful at the same time. They may be considered the first surrealist texts in world literature. Because it speaks to issues that are similar to surrealist texts. He even goes so far as to say that "I went into my heart and saw his houses".

== An excerpt ==
"Makhzan ol-Asrar" has 60 sections, the following poem is from section 15 titled "In describing the night and knowing the heart":

دور شو از راهزنان حواس راه تو دل داند دل را شناس

Translation:

Get away from the bandits of your attention
The heart knows your path, get to know [your] heart

عرش روانی که ز تن رسته‌اند شهپر جبریل به دل بسته‌اند

Translation:

Those mystics who escaped their bodies
Bound their hearts with the great wings of Gabriel

وانکه عنان از دو جهان تافتست قوت ز دیواره دل یافتست

Translation:

He who liberates himself from both worlds
Has found [the] strength [to do so] in the walls of his heart

== Date of composition ==
Since the book itself does not directly or indirectly mention the date of composition and also in other authoritative works the exact date of creation of this work is not mentioned, its date can not be determined with certainty; However, considering that Nezami gives other very accurate histories of the works, the age of the child and the material of other histories in his other works, as well as by examining the history of Azerbaijan and Arran, and comparative studies, it can be said that this work was created between 1165 and 1173 (probably close to 1173).

== Dedication ==
Nizami Ganjavi, dedicated the book to Fakhr al-Din Bahramshah, the governor of Erzincan at the time.

== Translations ==
The book has been translated into English, German, Turkish, Kurdish, and Russian.

== See also ==
- Khosrow and Shirin
- Layla and Majnun
- Haft Peykar
- Al-Nijat
