= Ali ibn Makula =

Islamic Scholar of Later Abbasid era

Ali ibn Makula ابن ماكولا
- Born: 1030; Ukbara, Iraq
- Died: 1083, 1086 or 1095; Jurjan, Iran
- Cause of death: Murder

Academic work
- Era: Later Abbasid era, (Islamic Golden Age)
- Main interests: biography history, genealogy, etymology, orthography
- Notable works: Kitāb al-Ikmāl

Abū Naṣr Alī ibn Hibat Allāh ibn Ja'far ibn Allakān ibn Muḥammad ibn Dulaf ibn Abī Dulaf al-Qāsim ibn 'Īsā al-Ijlī, surnamed Sa’d al-Muluk and known as Ibn Mākūlā (Arabic: ابن ماكولا; 1030/31–1082/83) was a highly regarded Arab muḥaddith (Ḥadīth scholar) and historian who authored several works. His magnum opus was his biographical-genealogical history on etymology and orthography of Islamic names, Al-Ikmāl.

== Life ==
Abū Naṣr ibn Mākūlā was born in the village Ukbara on the Tigris north of Baghdad to a noble Arab family. He was the son of Hibat Allah ibn Makula, vizier to the Buyid ruler of Basrah, Jalal al-Dawla.

He gained the title 'al-Amīr' (أمير), or 'prince', maybe in his own right, or in reference to his famous ancestor Abu Dulaf al-Ijli. His family had originally come from Jarbāzakān, between Hamadan and Isfahan in Iran, but his paternal uncle, was a muḥaddith (traditionist), and qāḍī (chief justice) in Baghdād where Ibn Mākūlā began his studies. He continued his education by travelling to the regional centres of learning across Irāq, Khurasan, Syria, Egypt, and Fars. In the last years of his life he held various official posts in the imperial administration of the Seljuk Empire, and once led an embassy to Bukhara to obtain the recognition of the new Abbasid Caliphate caliph al-Muqtadi (1075–1094).

One anecdote tells of a personal application made by Ibn Mākūlā on behalf of the grammarian Al-Akhfash al-Asghar|al-Akhfash the Younger, requesting a pension from the vizier Abu al-Hasan Ali ibn Isa. This was angrily rejected it seems and the scholar was left in abject poverty.

In the account of his eventual assassination the sources differ on details of location and date. It seems that sometime, either in 475 h. [1082/1083] or 487 h. [1094/95], or 479 h. [1086/87], he was on a trip for Khurasan when he was murdered and robbed by his Mamluk guards, (Note: Khallikān describes them as his Turkish slaves) either in Jurjan in Golestan province, or al-Ahvaz in Khuzestan; or in Kirman, Iran.

== Works ==
- Al-Ikmāl (الإكمال) ('Completion'); full title al-Ikmāl fī raf' al-irtiyāb 'an al-mu’talif wa al-mukhtalif min al-asmā' wa al-kunā wa al-ansāb (الإكمال في رفع الارتياب عن المؤتلف والمختلف في الأسماء والكنى والأنساب); 4 vols., (written 1071 – 1075) standard treatise on orthography and pronunciation of proper names. – Note: Originally published as a supplement to Al-Khātib Abū Bakr's Al-Mutanif Takmila al-Mukhtalif ('The recommenced, being the completion of the Mukhtalif'), or Al-Takmila, itself the combined works of: i) Al-Mūtalif wa Mukhtalif (المؤتلف والمختلف) by Al-Daraqutni and ii) Al-Mushtabih Al-Nisba from the Al-Kamāl fī ma’rifat asmā' al-Rijāl (الكمال في معرفة أسماء الرجال) by ḥāfiẓ Abd al-Ghānī.

— In 1232, muhaddith Ibn Nukta (ابن نقطة), published Takmila al-Ikmāl (تكملة الإكمال), as an addendum to Al-Ikmāl.

- Kitāb Tahdhib mustamar al-Awham 'alā dhuī al-ma’rifat wa awwalī al-Afhām (تهذيب مستمر الأوهام على ذوي المعرفة وأولي الأفهام)
- Mufākharat al-qalam wa’l-sayf wa’l-dīnār (مفاخرة القلم والسيف والدينار);
- Taʾrīkh al-Wuzarā ('History of the Viziers').

== See also ==
- Ibn Inabah

== External links/References ==
- Ali ibn Makula's publications
- ARABIC BOOKS BY IBN MAKULA, ALI IBN HIBAT ALLAH

== See also ==
- Encyclopædia Britannica Online
- List of Arab scientists and scholars
- Brockelmann, Carl (2016). History of the Arabic Written Tradition Volume 1. BRILL. ISBN 978-90-04-32626-2.
- Athīr (Ibn al-), Abū al-Ḥusayn 'Alī (1862). Carl Johan Tornberg, C.J. (ed.). Al-Kāmi fī al-Ta'rikh (Chronicon Quod Perfectissimum Inscribitur.) (in Arabic). Leiden: Brill.
- Baghdādī (al-), al-Khatib Abū Bakr Aḥmad ibn 'Alī (1931). Taʾrīkh Baghdād (in Arabic). Vol. VIII. Beirut: Al-Sa’ādah Press. p. 80.
- Kathīr (Ibn), Ismail (1966). Kitāb al-Bidāya Wa'l-Nihāya (in Arabic). Vol. XII. Beirut: Riyadh. pp. 18, 22, 24, 32, 46, 123.
- Khallikān (Ibn), Aḥmad ibn Muḥammad (1843). Ibn Khallikān's Biographical Dictionary (translation of Wafayāt al-A'yān wa-Anbā' al-Zamān). Vol. II. Translated by McGuckin de Slane, William. London: W.H. Allen. pp. 248–250.
- Mākūlā (ibn), 'Alī (1962). Al-Yamānī, ʿAbd-al-Raḥmān b. Yaḥyā (ed.). Kitāb al-Ikmāl. Vol. I. Hyderabad. pp. 1–61.
- Mākūlā (ibn), 'Alī (1990). Sayyid Kasrawī Ḥasan (ed.). Tahdhīb mustamirr al-awhām : ʻalá dhawī al-maʻrifah wa-ūlī al-afhām (in Arabic). Bayrūt: Dār al-Kutub al-ʻIlmīyah.
- Taghrībirdī (Ibn), Abū al-Maḥāsin Yūsuf (1956). Popper, William (ed.). al-Nujūm al-zāhirah fī mulūk Miṣr wa-al-Qāhirah. Cairo: Dār al-Kutub al-Miṣrīyah.
- Vadet, J.-C . "Ibn Mākūlā." Encyclopaedia of Islam, second edition. Edited by: P. Bearman, Th. Bianquis, C.E. Bosworth, E. van Donzel, W.P. Heinrichs. Brill Online, 2016. Reference. June 7, 2016 http://referenceworks.brillonline.com/entries/encyclopaedia-of-islam-2/ibn-makula-SIM_3280
- Yāqūt, Shihab al-Dīn 'Abd Allāh al-Ḥamawī (1927). Margoliouth, D. S. (ed.). Irshād al-Arīb alā Ma'rifat al-Adīb (Yaqut's Dictionary of Learned Men), Odabāʾ. Vol. V. Leiden: Brill. pp. 435–40.
- al-Ziriklī, Khayr al-Dīn (2007). Al-Aʻlām, qāmūs tarājim li-ashhar al-rijāl wa-al-nisāʼ min al-ʻArab wa-al-mustaʻribīn wa-al-mustashriqīn (in Arabic) (17 ed.). Bayrūt: Dār al-ʻIlm lil-Malāyīn.
