= Muhammad ibn Habib al-Baghdadi =

Iraqi historian, writer and linguist

Personal life
- Born: Abu Ja'far Muhammad ibn Habib ibn Umayyah ibn 'Amr al-Hashimi Baghdad, Abbasid Caliphate
- Died: 860 CE Baghdad, Abbasid Caliphate
- Main interest(s): Islamic history, history of pre-Islamic Arabia
- Notable work: Kitāb al-Muḥabbar
- Occupation: Writer, historian, and linguist

Religious life
- Religion: Islam
- Denomination: Sunni Islam

Muhammad ibn Habib al-Baghdadi (Arabic: محمد بن حبيب البغدادي), full name Abu Ja'far Muhammad ibn Habib ibn Umayyah ibn 'Amr al-Hashimi, was a ninth-century historian, writer and linguist who lived in Baghdad, Iraq.

== Career ==
Al-Baghdadi was a staunch supporter of the Abbasid Caliphate and wrote more than ten works on history, genealogy, biographies and the Arabic language, including poetry collections and linguistic works. Muhammad ibn Habib al-Baghdadi died in the year 860 CE (year 245 of the Hijri calendar).

== Notable works ==
- Kitāb al-Muḥabbar
- Asmāʼ al-mughtālīn min al-ashrāf fī al-Jāhilīyah wa-al-Islām: Wa-yalīhi Kuná al-shuʻarāʼ wa-man ghalabat kunyatuhu ʻalá ismih (Prominent Murder Victims of the Pre-Islamic and Early Islamic Periods: Including the Names of Murdered Poets)
- al-Munmaq fi 'Akhbar al-Quraysh (The Broad Histories of the Quraysh)
- al-Shu'ara wa an-Sabuhum (The Poets and Their Lineages)

== See also ==
- List of Muslim historians
- Ibn Inabah
