= Al-Zubayr ibn Bakkar =

Arab Historian and genealogist of Abbasid era (788–870)

al-Zubayr ibn Bakkār
- Title: al-Nassābah (lit. 'The Genealogist')

Personal life
- Born: 788 CE/172 AH; Medina, Abbasid Caliphate
- Died: 870 CE/256 AH; Mecca, Abbasid Caliphate
- Era: Islamic Golden Age (Abbasid era)
- Region: Abbasid Caliphate
- Main interest(s): History, Genealogy, Poetry
- Occupation: Arab historian

Religious life
- Religion: Islam
- Creed: Sunni

al-Zubayr ibn Bakkār (Arabic: أبو عبدالله الزبير بن بكار بن عبد الله بن مصعب بن ثابت بن عبد الله بن الزبير بن العوام, (788-870 CE / 172–256 AH), a descendant of al-Zubayr ibn al-ʻAwwām, was a leading Arab Muslim historian and genealogist of the Arabs, particularly the Hijaz region. He composed a number of works on genealogy that made him a standing authority on the subject of the genealogies of the Quraysh tribe. Ibn Hajar al-Asqalani regarded him as the most reliable authority on Qurayshite genealogy.

== Biography ==
He was born and raised in Medina and served as the qadi of Mecca in 242 AH (c. 864 CE). In one of his visits to Baghdad, Ibn Bakkar was invited by the Abbasid caliph al-Mutawakkil to become the tutor to his son.

He died in Mecca after he fell from a roof.

== Works ==
Works attributed to Ibn Bakkar:

=== Published works ===
- Jamharat nasab Quraysh wa-akhbāruhā (جمهرة نسب قريش وأخبارها)
- Al-Akhbār al-muwaffaqīyāt (الأخبار الموفقيات)
- Ah̲bār Abī Abī Dahbal al-Jumaḥī (أخبار أبي دهبل الجمحي)
- Azwāj al-Nabī (أزواج النبي). The edited version is named: Al-Muntakhab min Kitāb azwāj al-Nabī (المنتخب من كتاب أزواج النبي)
- Commentary on "Kitāb al-Amthāl" of Abū ʻUbayd al-Qāsim ibn Sallām
- Commentary on "Kitāb al-Nasab" of Abū ʻUbayd al-Qāsim ibn Sallām

=== Lost works ===
- Akhbār al-ʻArab wa-ayyāmuhā (أخبار العرب وأيامها)- translit., "Arabs & Their Times"
- Nawādir akhbār al-nasab (نوادر أخبار النسب)
- Al-ikhtilāf (الاختلاف) or Al-aḥlāf (الأحلاف)- translit., "Alliances"
- Nawādir al-madanīyīn (نوادر المدنيين)
- Al-nakhīl (النخيل)- translit., "Palm Trees"
- Al-ʻaqīq wa-akhbāruhu (العقيق وأخباره)
- Al-Aws wa-al-Khazraj (الأوس والخزرج) - translit., "The Aws & The Khazraj (Tribes)"

== See also ==
- Ibn Inabah
