= The Book of Healing =

Scientific and philosophical encyclopedia by Avicenna

- Author: Ibn Sina
- Original title: كتاب الشفاء
- Language: Arabic
- Subject: Philosophy, Natural sciences, Mathematics, Logic, Metaphysics
- Genre: Scientific and philosophical encyclopedia
- Published: 1027 (Arabic)
- Publication place: Islamic world (Persia)
- Media type: Manuscript (original); hardcover/paperback (modern editions)

The Book of Healing (Arabic: کتاب الشفاء, romanized: Kitāb al-Shifāʾ; Latin: Sufficientia; also known as The Cure or Assepha)is a scientific and philosophical encyclopedia written by Abu Ali ibn Sīna (also known as Avicenna). He most likely began to compose the book in 1014, completed it around 1020, and published it in 1027.

This work is Ibn Sina's major work on science and philosophy, and is intended to "cure" or "heal" ignorance of the soul. Thus, despite its title, it is not concerned with medicine, in contrast to Avicenna's earlier The Canon of Medicine (5 vols.) which is, in fact, medical.

The book is divided into four parts: logic, natural sciences, mathematics (a quadrivium of arithmetic, geometry, astronomy), and metaphysics. It was influenced by ancient Greek philosophers such as Aristotle; Hellenistic thinkers such as Ptolemy; and earlier Persian/Muslim scientists and philosophers, such as Al-Kindi (Alkindus), Al-Farabi (Alfarabi), and Al-Bīrūnī.

== Sciences ==
=== Astronomy ===
In astronomy, the book proposes the theory that Venus is closer to Earth than the Sun.

=== Chemistry ===
Ibn Sina's theory on the formation of metals combined the alchemical sulfur-mercury theory of metals (although he was a critic of alchemy) with the mineralogical theories of Aristotle and Theophrastus. He created a synthesis of ideas concerning the nature of the mineral and metallic states.

=== Earth sciences ===
Toulmin and Goodfield (1965), commented on Avicenna's contribution to geology:

Around A.D. 1000, Avicenna was already suggesting a hypothesis about the origin of mountain ranges, which in the Christian world, would still have been considered quite radical eight hundred years later.

Paleontology

Ibn Sina also contributed to paleontology with his explanation of how the stoniness of fossils was caused. Aristotle previously explained it in terms of vaporous exhalations, which Ibn Sina modified into the theory of petrifying fluids (succus lapidificatus), which was elaborated on by Albertus Magnus in the 13th century and accepted in some form by most naturalists by the 16th century. Ibn Sina made the following observation on the theories held at the time on fossils and the petrifaction of plants and animals:

"If what is said concerning the petrifaction of animals and plants is true, the cause of this (phenomenon) is a powerful mineralizing and petrifying virtue which arises in certain stony spots, or emanates suddenly from the earth during earthquake and subsidences, and petrifies whatever comes into contact with it. As a matter of fact, the petrifaction of the bodies of plants and animals is not more extraordinary than the transformation of waters."

=== Psychology ===
In The Book of Healing, Avicenna discusses the mind, its existence, the mind–body relationship, sensation, perception, etc. He writes that at the most common level, the influence of the mind on the body can be seen in voluntary movements, in that the body obeys whenever the mind wishes to move the body. He further writes that the second level of influence of the mind on the body is from emotions and the will. As an example, he states that if a plank of wood is placed as a bridge over a chasm, a person could hardly creep over it without falling if that person only pictures themself in a possible fall so vividly that the "natural power of limbs accord with it."

He also writes that strong negative emotions can have a negative effect on the vegetative functions of an individual and may even lead to death in some cases. He also discusses hypnosis (al Wahm al-Amil), stating that one could create conditions in another person so that they accepts the reality of hypnosis. Avicenna was also the first to divide human perception into the five external senses (the classical senses of hearing, sight, smell, taste and touch known since ancient history) and the five internal senses which he discovered himself:

1. sensus communis ('common sense'), which integrates sense data into percepts;
2. the imaginative faculty, which conserves the perceptual images;
3. imagination, which acts upon these images by combining and separating them, serving as the seat of the practical intellect;
4. wahm (instinct), which perceives qualities (such as good and bad, love and hate, etc.) and forms the basis of a person's character whether or not influenced by reason; and
5. ma'ni (intentions), which conserve all these notions in memory.

Avicenna also gives psychological explanations for certain somatic illnesses, always linking the physical and psychological illnesses together. He describes melancholia (i.e. depression) as a type of mood disorder in which the person may become suspicious and develop certain types of phobias. He states that anger heralds the transition of melancholia to mania, and explains that humidity inside the head can contribute to mood disorders. He recognizes that this occurs when the amount of breath changes: happiness increases the breath, which leads to increased moisture inside the brain, but if this moisture goes beyond its limits, the brain would lose control over its rationality and lead to mental disorders. He also writes about symptoms and treatments for nightmare, epilepsy, and weak memory.

Avicenna often used psychological methods to treat his patients. One such example is when a Persian prince had melancholia, suffering from the delusion that he was a cow. He would moo and cry out, "Kill me so that a good stew may be made of my flesh," and would never eat anything. Avicenna was persuaded to take the case. Avicenna sent a message to the patient, asking him to be happy as the butcher was coming to slaughter him, and the sick man rejoiced. When Avicenna approached the prince with a knife in his hand, he asked "where is the cow so I may kill it." The patient then mooed like a cow to indicate where he was. The patient was laid on the ground for slaughter. When Avicenna approached the patient, pretending to be ready to slaughter him, he said, "the cow is too lean and not ready to be killed. He must be fed properly and I will kill it when it becomes healthy and fat." The patient was then offered food which he ate eagerly, and gradually "gained strength, got rid of his delusion, and was completely cured."

== Philosophy ==
In the medieval Islamic world, due to Avicenna's successful reconciliation of Aristotelianism and Neoplatonism along with Kalam, Avicennism eventually became the leading school of early Islamic philosophy by the 12th century, with Avicenna becoming a central authority on philosophy.

Avicennism was also influential in medieval Europe, particular his doctrines on the nature of the soul and his existence-essence distinction, along with the debates and censure that they raised in scholastic Europe. This was particularly the case in Paris, where Avicennism was later proscribed in 1210. Nevertheless, his Muslim psychology and theory of knowledge influenced William of Auvergne and Albertus Magnus, while his metaphysics influenced the thought of Thomas Aquinas and John Duns Scotus.

=== Logic ===
Avicenna discussed the topic of logic in Islamic philosophy extensively in his works, and developed his own system of logic known as "Avicennian logic" as an alternative to Aristotelian logic. By the 12th century, Avicennian logic had replaced Aristotelian logic as the dominant system of logic in the Islamic world. After the Latin translations of the 12th century, his writings on logic were also an important influence on Western medieval writers such as Albertus Magnus.

He wrote on the hypothetical syllogism and on the propositional calculus, which were both part of the Stoic logical tradition. He developed an original theory of “temporally modalized” syllogistic and made use of inductive logic, such as the methods of agreement, difference and concomitant variation which are critical to the scientific method.

=== Metaphysics ===
Early Islamic metaphysics, imbued as it is with Islamic theology, distinguishes more clearly than Aristotelianism the difference between essence and existence. Whereas existence is the domain of the contingent and the accidental, essence endures within a being beyond the accidental. The philosophy of Ibn Sīnā, particularly that part relating to metaphysics, owes much to al-Farabi. The search for a truly definitive Islamic philosophy can be seen in what is left to us of his work.

Following al-Farabi's lead, Avicenna initiated a full-fledged inquiry into the question of being, in which he distinguished between essence (mahiat) and existence (wujud). He argued that the fact of existence can not be inferred from or accounted for by the essence of existing things and that form and matter by themselves cannot interact and originate the movement of the universe or the progressive actualization of existing things. Existence must, therefore, be due to an agent-cause that necessitates, imparts, gives, or adds existence to an essence. To do so, the cause must be an existing thing and coexist with its effect.

Avicenna's proof for the existence of God was the first ontological argument, which he proposes in the "Metaphysics" section of The Book of Healing. This was the first attempt at using the method of a priori proof, which utilizes intuition and reason alone. Avicenna's proof of God's existence is unique in that it can be classified as both a cosmological argument and an ontological argument. "It is ontological insofar as ‘necessary existence’ in intellect is the first basis for arguing for a Necessary Existent". The proof is also "cosmological insofar as most of it is taken up with arguing that contingent existents cannot stand alone and must end up in a Necessary Existent."

=== Philosophy of science ===
In the "Al-Burhan" ('On Demonstration') section of the book, Avicenna discusses the philosophy of science and describes an early scientific method of inquiry. He discusses Aristotle's Posterior Analytics and significantly diverges from it on several points. Avicenna explains the issue of a proper methodology for scientific inquiry and the question of "How does one acquire the first principles of a science?" He asks how a scientist would arrive at "the initial axioms or hypotheses of a deductive science without inferring them from some more basic premises?" He explains that the ideal situation is when one grasps that a "relation holds between the terms, which would allow for absolute, universal certainty." Avicenna then adds two further methods for arriving at the first principles: the ancient Aristotelian method of induction (istiqra), and the method of examination and experimentation (tajriba). Avicenna criticizes Aristotelian induction, arguing that "it does not lead to the absolute, universal, and certain premises that it purports to provide." In its place, he develops a "method of experimentation as a means for scientific inquiry."

== Sections of the text ==
Critical editions of the Arabic text have been published in Cairo, 1952–83, originally under the supervision of Ibrahim Madkour; some of these editions are given below.

- Al-Mantiq (Logic), Part 1, al-Ahwani, Cairo: al-Matba’ah al-Amiriyah, 1952. (Volume I, Part 1 of al-Shifa’.)
- Al-‘Ibarah (Interpretation), edited by M. El-Khodeiri. Cairo: Dar al-Katib al-Arabi, 1970. (Volume 1, Part 3 of al-Shifa’.)
- Al-Qiyas (Syllogism), edited by S. Zayed and I. Madkour, Cairo: Organisme General des Imprimeries Gouvernementales, 1964. (Volume I, Part 4 of al-Shifa’.)
  - Shehaby, N., trans. 1973. The Propositional Logic of Ibn Sina, Dordrecht: Reidel.
- Al-Burhan (Demonstration), edited by A. E. Affifi. Cairo: Organisme General des Imprimeries Gouvernementales, 1956. (Volume I, Part 5 of al-Shifa’.)
- Al-Jadal (Dialectic), edited by A.F. Al-Ehwany. Cairo: Organisme General des Imprimeries Gouvernementales, 1965. (Volume I, Part 6 of al-Shifa’.)
- Al-Khatabah (Rhetoric), edited by S. Salim, Cairo: Imprimerie Nationale, 1954. (Volume I, Part 8 of al-Shifa’.)
- Al-Ilahiyat (Theology), edited by M.Y. Moussa, S. Dunya and S. Zayed, Cairo: Organisme General des Imprimeries Gouvernementales, 1960;
  - R. M. Savory and D. A. Agius, ed. and trans. 1984. ‘Ibn Sina on Primary Concepts in the Metaphysics of al-Shifa’, in Logos Islamikos, Toronto, Ont.: Pontifical Institute for Mediaeval Studies;
  - Anawati, G. C., trans. 1978, 1985. "La metaphysique du Shifa’ [The Metaphysics of al-Shifa’]," (Etudes Musulmanes 21 and 27). Paris: Vrin. (Vol. I, Books 1-5; Vol. II. Books 6-10.)
  - Marmura, Michael E. 2005. The Metaphysics of the Healing. A parallel English-Arabic text, with introduction and annotation by M. E. Marmura. Provo, UT: Brigham Young University Press.
- Al-Nafs (The Soul), edited by G. C. Anawati and S. Zayed. Cairo: Organisme General des Imprimeries Gouvernementales, 1975;
  - Rahman, F., ed. 1959. Avicenna's De Anima, Being the Psychological Part of Kitab al-Shifa’, London: Oxford University Press, 1959. (Volume 1, part 6 of al-Shifa’.)

== In English Translation ==
BYU's Islamic Translation Series includes two parts of The Healing.

- Avicenna (2005). The Metaphysics of The Healing. Translated by Marmura, Michael E. Provo, Utah: Brigham Young University.
- Avicenna (2010). The Physics of The Healing: A Parallel English-Arabic Text in Two Volumes. Translated by McGinnis, Jon. Provo, Utah: Brigham Young University.

== See also ==
- Avicenna
  - The Canon of Medicine
- Islamic Golden Age
  - Early Islamic philosophy
  - Islamic science
- Medical literature
