= The Canon of Medicine =

1025 Encyclopedia of medicine compiled by Avicenna

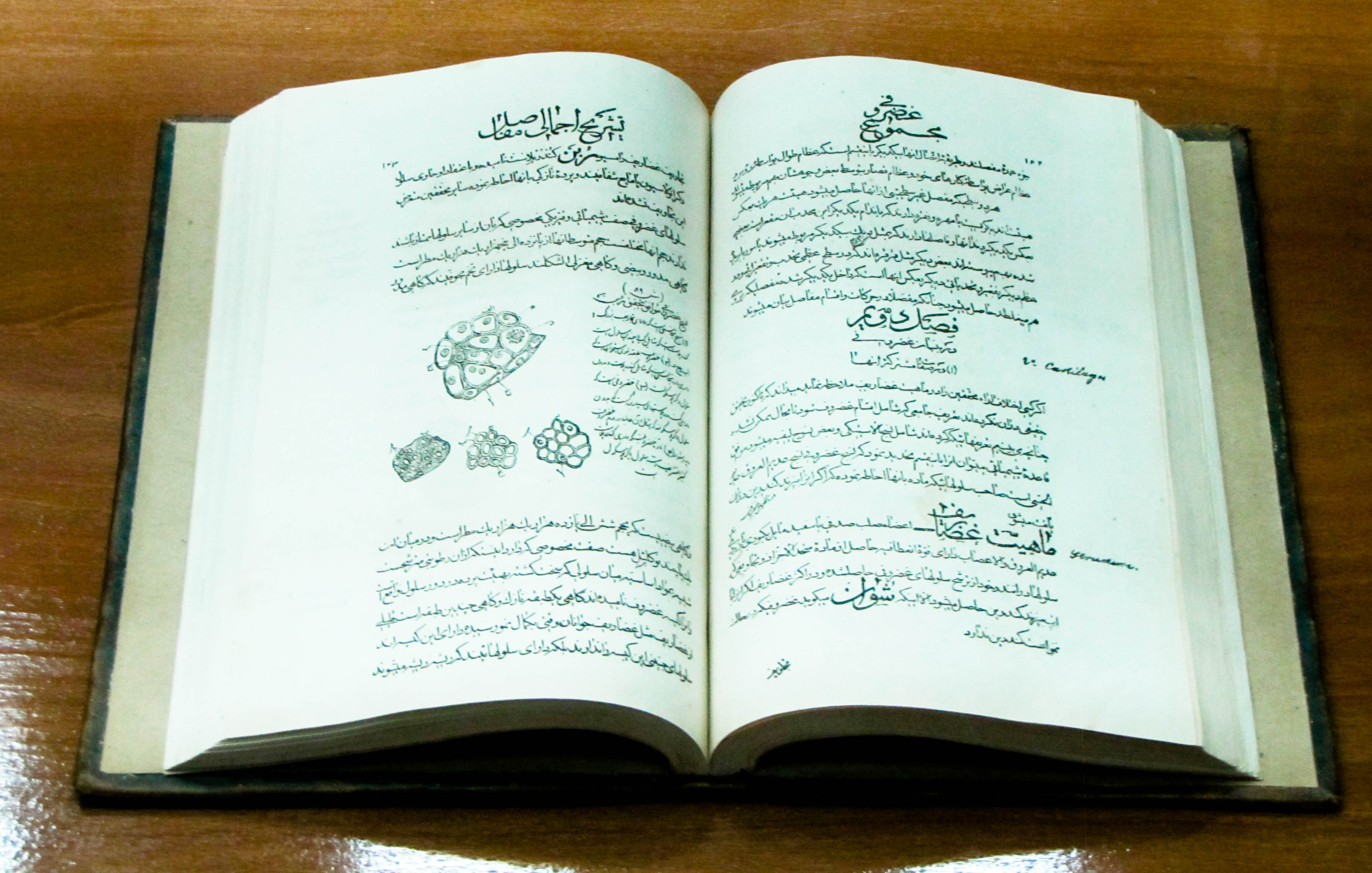
- Persian version of The Canon of Medicine at Avicenna's mausoleum in Hamedan
- Author: Ibn Sina
- Original title: القانون في الطب
- Language: Arabic
- Genre: Medical literature
- Published: 1025 (Arabic)

The Canon of Medicine (Arabic: القانون في الطب, romanized: al-Qānūn fī l-ṭibb) is an encyclopedia of medicine in five books compiled by Ibn Sina (ابن سینا, Avicenna) and completed in 1025. It is among the most influential works of its time. It presents an overview of the contemporary medical knowledge of the Islamic world, which had been influenced by earlier traditions including Greco-Roman medicine (particularly Galen), Persian medicine, Chinese medicine and Indian medicine. Its translation from Arabic to Latin in 12th century Toledo greatly influenced the development of medieval medicine. It became the standard textbook for teaching in European universities into the early modern period.

The Canon of Medicine remained a medical authority for centuries. It set the standards for medicine in medieval Europe and the Islamic world and was used as a standard medical textbook through the 18th century in Europe. It is an important text in Unani medicine, a form of traditional medicine practiced in India.

== Title ==
The English title Canon of Medicine is derived from the common medieval Latin Canon Medicinae, itself a translation of the original Arabic القانون في الطب (al-Qānūn fī aṭ-Ṭibb), with the same meaning. "Canon" (often translated in English as "law" or "legal code") here connotes an ordered system, or complete, universal encyclopedia. The common medieval version of the title was Liber Canonis.

== Development ==
The medical traditions of Galen, and thereby Hippocrates, had dominated Islamic medicine from its beginnings. Avicenna sought to fit these traditions into Aristotle's natural philosophy. He began writing the Canon in Gorganj, continued in Rey and completed it in Hamadan in 1025. The result was a "clear and ordered "summa" of all the medical knowledge of Ibn Sīnā's time". It served as a more concise reference in contrast to Galen's twenty volumes of medical corpus.

== Overview ==
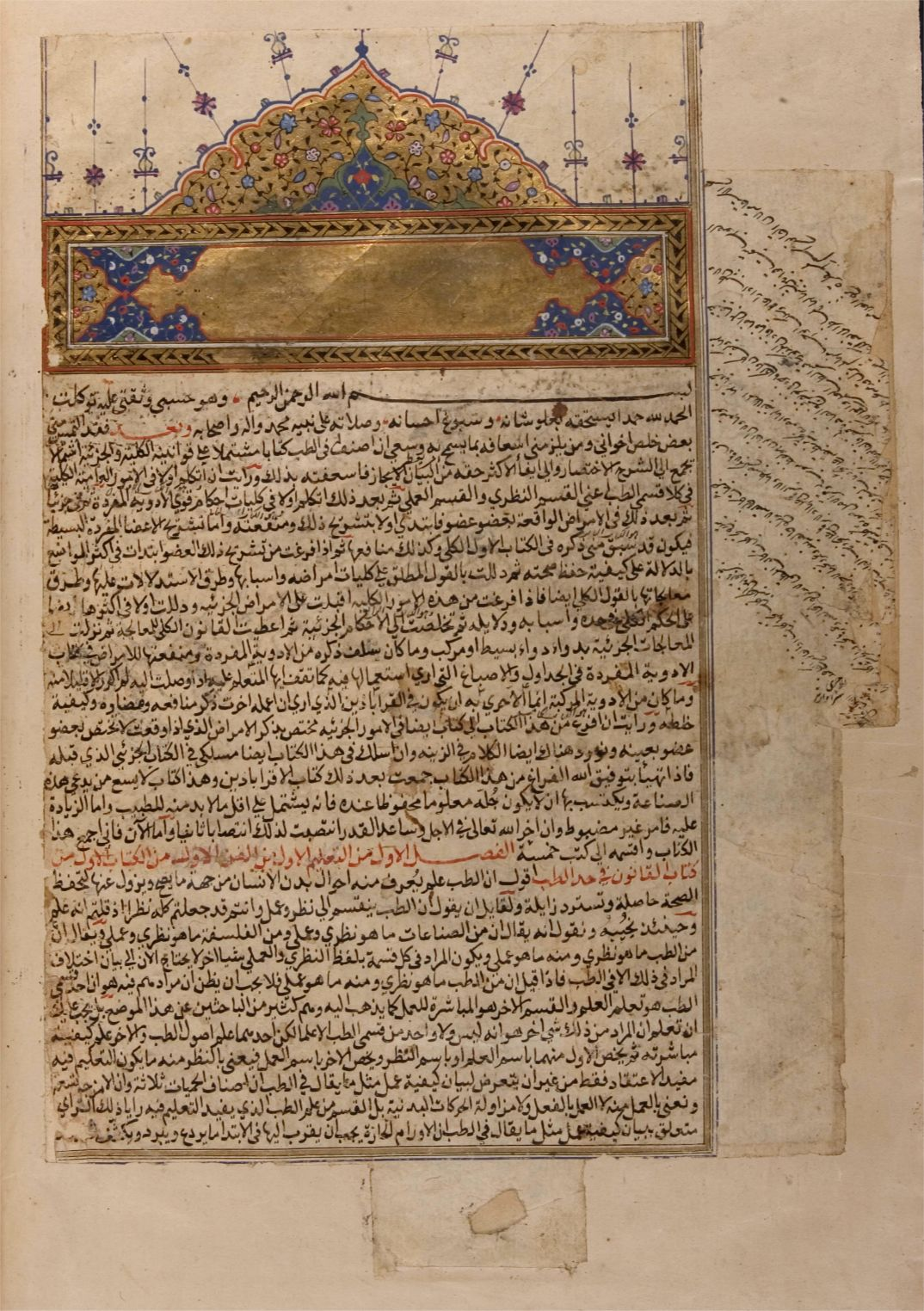
First page of the introduction to the first book (Arabic manuscript, 1597)

The Canon of Medicine is divided into five books:

1. Essays on basic medical and physiological principles, anatomy, regimen and general therapeutic procedures.
2. List of medical substances, arranged alphabetically, following an essay on their general properties.
3. Diagnosis and treatment of diseases specific to one part of the body
4. Diagnosis and treatment of conditions covering multiple body parts or the entire body.
5. Formulary of compound remedies.

Books 1, 3, and 4 are each further divided into parts (fanns), chapters (ta’līms), subchapters (jumlahs), sections (faṣls), and subsections (bābs).

== Book 1 ==
Book 1 is made up of six theses which give a general description of medicine in general, the cosmic elements that make up the cosmos and the human body, the mutual interaction of elements (temperaments), fluids of the body (humours), human anatomy, and physiology. The book explains the causes of health and disease. Avicenna believed that the human body cannot be restored to health unless the causes of both health and disease are determined. He defined medicine (tibb) as follows:

"Medicine is the science by which we learn the various states of the body; in health, when not in health; the means by which health is likely to be lost; and, when lost, is likely to be restored. In other words, it is the art whereby health is concerned and the art by which it is restored after being lost."

=== Thesis I Definition and Scope of Medicine ===
Avicenna begins part one by dividing theoretical medicine and medical practice. He describes what he says are the "four causes" of illness, based on Aristotelian philosophy: The material cause, the efficient cause, the formal cause, and the final cause:

1. Material Cause: Avicenna says that this cause is the human subject itself, the "members or the breath" or "the humours" indirectly.
2. Efficient Cause: The efficient cause is broken up into two categories: The first is "Extrinsic", or the sources external to the human body such as air or the region we live in. The second efficient cause is the "Intrinsic", or the internal sources such as our sleep and "its opposite-the waking state", the "different periods of life", habits, and race.
3. Formal Cause: The formal cause is what Avicenna called "the constitutions; the compositions". According to Oskar Cameron Gruner, who provides a treatise within Avicenna's Canon of Medicine, this was in agreement with Galen who believed that the formal cause of illness is based upon the individual's temperament.
4. Final Cause: The final cause is given as "the actions or functions".

=== Thesis II The Elements of Cosmology ===
Avicenna's thesis on the elements of the cosmos is described by Gruner as "the foundation of the whole Canon". Avicenna insists here that a physician must assume the four elements that are described by natural philosophy, although Avicenna makes it clear that he distinguishes between the "simple" element, not mixed with anything else, and what we actually experience as water or air, such as the sea or the atmosphere. The elements we experience are mixed with small amounts of other elements and are therefore not the pure elemental substances. The "light" elements are fire and air, while the "heavy" are earth and water:

1. The Earth: Avicenna upholds Aristotelian philosophy by describing Earth as an element that is geocentric. The Earth is at rest, and other things tend towards it because of its intrinsic weight. It is cold and dry.
2. The Water: Water is described as being exterior to the sphere of the Earth and interior to the sphere of the Air, because of its relative density. It is cold and moist. "Being moist, shapes can be readily fashioned (with it), and as easily lost (and resolved)."
3. The Air: The position of Air above Water and beneath Fire is "due to its relative lightness". It is "hot and moist", and its effect is to "rarefy" and make things "softer".
4. The (sphere of the) Fire: Fire is higher than the other elements, "for it reaches to the world of the heavens". It is hot and dry; it traverses the substance of the air, and subdues the coldness of the two heavy elements; "by this power it brings the elementary properties into harmony."

=== Thesis III The Temperaments ===
The Canon of Medicine divides the thesis on temperaments into three subsections; a general overview, one based on members of the body, and temperaments based on age.

==== I The Temperaments (General description) ====
The temperaments are reported to be the interaction between the four different element's qualities, such as the conflict between dryness, wetness, cold, and hot. Avicenna suggests that these qualities battle between each other until an equilibrium state is reached and this state is known as the temperaments.

The Canon also adopted the ancient theory of Four Temperaments and extended it to encompass "emotional aspects, mental capacity, moral attitudes, self-awareness, movements and dreams". This expanded theory of four temperaments is given in the following table:

Evidences of the four primary temperaments
Evidence	Hot	Cold	Moist	Dry
Morbid states	Inflammations become febrile Loss of vigour	Fevers related to serous humour Rheumatism	Lassitude	
Functional power	Deficient energy	Deficient digestive power	Difficult digestion	
Subjective sensations	Bitter taste Excessive thirst Burning cardiac orifice	Lack of desire for fluids	Mucoid salivation Sleepiness	Insomnia, wakefulness
Physical signs	High pulse rate, approaching lassitude	Flaccid joints	Diarrhea; Swollen eyelids	Rough skin Acquired habit
Foods & medicines	Calefacients harmful	Infrigidants harmful	Moist aliments harmful	Dry regimen harmful
Foods & medicines	Infrigidants beneficial	Calefacients beneficial		Humectants beneficial
Relation to weather	Worse in summer	Worse in winter		Bad in autumn

The Eight Varieties of Equipoise

Canon describes humans as having eight different "varieties of equipoise", or differing temperaments. The temperaments fall under two categories; In relation to beings other than men and in relation to the individual himself.

A. In relation to beings other than men

i. "the equability of the temperament seen in man as compared with other creatures"
ii. the temperament of other human beings

Avicenna describes a hot versus cold / moist versus dry equilibrium between the members of the human body. The heart, for example, is hot and must be in equilibrium of other cold parts of the body such as the brain. When this equilibrium between these members are achieved, the person is considered to be in "ideal equability".

iii. external factors "such as race, climate, atmosphere"

This third gauge for temperament assumes that each race has their own equilibrium. As an example he says, "The Hindus, in health, have a different equability to the Slaves, and so on." Avicenna explains that the differing climates contribute to differing temperaments among the races.

iv. in relation to extreme climates

B. In relation to the individual himself

v. "as compared to another person"

Although Avicenna had listed the fifth mode "as compared to another person", he seems to contradict that statement by explaining that every individual has a temperament that is unique to themselves and unlike anyone else.

vi. comparison of the individual himself
vii. comparing one member of the body with another member of the body

The Canon here makes the distinction of the members into categories of their individual "moistness", "dryness", "hotness", and "coldness".

viii. comparison of a member to itself

The Canon continues to explain the sun's position in relation to ideal temperament and the role that climate and human skin play. Organs are nowhere near ideal in temperament, but skin comes the closest. Avicenna says that the hand, especially the palm and the tip of the index finger, is the most sensitive of all and attuned to tactile contact. Medicine is described as "hot" or "cold", not based upon its actual temperature but with regard to how it relates to the temperament of the human body.

The Canon then describes when temperaments are unequal, in other words, illness. Avicenna separates these into two categories, which are fairly self explainable within the context of what he had already defined as the temperaments.

A. Simple "intemperaments"

1. Hot temperament (hotter than normal)
2. Cold temperament (colder than normal)
3. Dry temperament (drier than usual)
4. Moist temperament (more moist than usual)

B. Compound "intemperaments"

The compound intemperaments are where two things are wrong with the temperament, i.e. hotter and moister; hotter and drier; colder and moister; colder and drier. There are only four because something cannot be simultaneously hotter and colder or drier and moister. The four simple temperaments and four compound intemperaments can each be divided into "Those apart from any material substance" and "Those in which some material substance is concerned", for a total of sixteen intemperaments. Examples of the sixteen intemperaments are provided in the "third and fourth volumes."

==== II The Temperament of the Several Members ====
Each member of the body is described to be given each its individual temperament, each with its own degree of heat and moisture. Avicenna lists members of the body in "order of degree of Heat", from hottest to coldest.

1. The breath and "the heart in which it arises";
2. The blood; which is said to be generated from the liver;
3. The liver, which may be looked upon as concentrated blood;
4. The flesh, which would be as hot as the liver were it not for the nervous tissue which pervades it;
5. The muscles, which are cooler than the flesh because of their tendons and ligaments, as well as the nerves;
6. The spleen, which is colder because of the faex of the blood;
7. The kidneys;
8. The wall of the arteries;
9. The veins;
10. The skin of the palms and soles.

Then a list is given of coldest members to hottest.

1. The serious humour;
2. The hairs;
3. The bones;
4. The cartilage;
5. The ligaments;
6. The tendon;
7. The membranes;
8. The nerves;
9. The spinal cord;
10. The brain;
11. The fat;
12. The oil of the body;
13. The skin.

Then a list is given in order of moisture. Avicenna credits Galen with this particular list.

1. The serious humour
2. The blood
3. The oil
4. the fat
5. the brain
6. the spinal cord
7. the breasts and the testicles
8. the lung
9. the liver
10. the spleen
11. the kidneys
12. the muscles
13. the skin

Finally, a list is given in order of dryness

1. the hair
2. the bone
3. cartilage
4. ligaments
5. tendons
6. sereous membranes
7. arteries
8. veins
9. motor nerves
10. heart
11. sensory nerves
12. skin

==== III The Temperaments Belonging to Age ====
The Canon divides life into four "periods" and then subdivides the first period into five separate categories.

The following table is provided for the four periods of life:

Period	Title	Name	Year of Age
I	The Period of Growth	Adolescence	Up to 30
II	The Prime of Life	Period of beauty	Up to 35 or 40
III	Elderly life	Period of decline. Senescence.	Up to about 60
IV	Decrepit Age	Senility	To the end of life

Avicenna says that the third period shows signs of decline in vigor and some decline in intellectual power. In the fourth period, both vigor and intelligence decline.

Avicenna divides the beginning stage of life in the following table, according to Oskar Cameron Gruner's edition of the Canon of Medicine:

Sub-division	Name	Distinctive Characters
First	Infancy	The period before the limbs are fitted for walking
Second	Babyhood	The period of formation of the teeth. Walking has been learnt, but is not steady. The gums are not full of teeth.
Third	Childhood	The body shows strength of movement. The teeth are fully out. Pollutions have not yet appeared
Fourth	Juvenility. "Puberty"	The period up to the development of hair on the face and pubes. Pollutions begin.
Fifth	Youth	The period up to the limit of growth of the body (to the beginning of adult life). Period of athletic power.

Avicenna generalizes youth as having a "hot" temperament, but comments that there is controversy over which periods of youth are hotter. The general notion that youth are "hot" in temperament is due to youth's supposed relationship to members of the body that are hot. For example, blood was considered "hot" as was mentioned earlier, therefore youth is assumed to be hot partially due to blood being more "plentiful" and "thicker", according to Avicenna. Evidence for youth having an excess of blood is suggested by Avicenna's observation that nose bleeds are more frequent within youth. Other contributing factors are the youth's association with sperm and the consistency of their bile. Further description of youth in regards to heat and moisture is given with respect to sex, geographical location, and occupation. The Canon says, for example, that females are colder and more moist.

=== The Humours ===
The Canon of Medicine is based upon the Four Humours of Hippocratic medicine, but refined in various ways. In disease pathogenesis, for example, Avicenna "added his own view of different types of spirits (or vital life essences) and souls, whose disturbances might lead to bodily diseases because of a close association between them and such master organs as the brain and heart". An element of such belief is apparent in the chapter of al-Lawa, which relates "the manifestations to an interruption of vital life essence to the brain." He combined his own view with that of the Four Humours to establish a new doctrine to explain the mechanisms of various diseases in another work he wrote, Treatise on Pulse:

"From mixture of the four [humors] in different weights, Allah Almighty [God the most high] created different organs; one with more blood like muscle, one with more black bile like bone, one with more phlegm like brain, and one with more yellow bile like lung.

Allah Almighty [God the most high] created the souls from the softness of humors; each soul has its own weight and amalgamation. The generation and nourishment of proper soul takes place in the heart; it resides in the heart and arteries, and is transmitted from the heart to the organs through the arteries. At first, it [proper soul] enters the master organs such as the brain, liver or reproductive organs; from there it goes to other organs while the nature of the soul is being modified in each [of them]. As long as [the soul] is in the heart, it is quite warm, with the nature of fire, and the softness of bile is dominant. Then, that part which goes to the brain to keep it vital and functioning, becomes colder and wetter, and in its composition the serous softness and phlegm vapor dominate. That part, which enters the liver to keep its vitality and functions, becomes softer, warmer and sensibly wet, and in its composition the softness of air and vapor of blood dominate.

In general, there are four types of proper spirit: One is brutal spirit residing in the heart and it is the origin of all spirits. Another – as physicians refer to it – is sensual spirit residing in the brain. The third – as physicians refer to it – is natural spirit residing in the liver. The fourth is generative – i.e. procreative – spirits residing in the gonads. These four spirits go-between the soul of absolute purity and the body of absolute impurity".

==== Definition of body fluid ====
The Canon defines a humour as "that fluid, moist 'body' into which our aliment is transformed", and lists the four primary types of fluids as sanguineous, serous, bilious, and atrabilious. The secondary fluids are separated into "non-excrementitious" and "excrementitious".

==== The sanguineous humour ====
Avicenna calls this humour "the most excellent of all" the humours. This section describes blood and compares its healthy states with its unhealthy states. Avicenna describes healthy blood as "red in colour, has no unpleasant odour, and has a very sweet taste." Abnormality of the blood stems from a change in temperament or an unhealthy humour has polluted it.

==== The serous humour ====
The serous humour is described as a sweet fluid that is cold and moist in relation to blood and bilious humours. Serous humour resembles blood and is necessary for body tissues for two reasons: to provide the tissue with nutrients as an auxiliary and to keep the bones and tissues moist.

==== The bilious humour ====
The bilious humour is red and clear in colour and is light and pungent. It can pursue two routes, either into the blood or the gallbladder. When it passes into the blood, its function is to attenuate the blood in such a way, that it enables the blood to transverse the very minutest channels of the body. The part which flows to the gallbladder is needed, since it cleanses the entire body of superfluity and nourishes the gallbladder.

==== The atrabilious humour ====
The atrabilious humor is considered dry and cold, and created from sediment of good blood. It originates from the liver and then is distributed to the blood or spleen. When sent, it is used to reinforce the corresponding part, and perform other functions. For the blood, it is used as nourishment for the bones. In the spleen, it is used to clean the body of waste products and control appetite. Excrementitious atrabilious humor, or the humoral waste products, are described as a bitter ash.

=== Anatomy or "The Members" ===
In his thesis on "The Members", Avicenna explains that the humours help to make up the members of the body, gives a general description and how to repair them.
Some are "simple members" or "elementary tissue" such as bone, cartilage and tendons. Some are "compound members" such as the heart, the liver, and the brain. He also categorizes these into vital organs and auxiliary organs.
Avicenna continues to classify the organs by different systems. "According to actions" organizes members by what they do. "According to their origin" classifies members by assuming that each member originates from the blood or from male or "female sperm".

=== General Physiology ===
In the thesis on General Physiology or "The Faculties of the Body", Avicenna separates life into three different categories: Vital, Natural, and Animal. He contrasts Galen's view that the brain is the "chief seat of sentient life" with Aristotle's view that the heart is the source of all the body's faculties, saying that if physicians considered the matter carefully they would agree with Aristotle that the heart was the ultimate source of all the faculties, even if (for example) the brain is where the rational faculty manifests itself.

== Book 2 Materia Medica ==
Book 2 (the Materia Medica) of the Canon alphabetically lists about 800 "simple" medical substances that were used at the time. The substances are simple in the sense of not being compounded with other substances. The first part gives general rules about drugs and a treatise on what was called "the science of powers of medicines". The second part is a list of 800 simple floral, mineral, and animal substances. Each entry contains the substance's name, its criteria of goodness (which sometimes describes how the substance is found in nature), and its nature or primary qualities. Next are listed one or more of 22 possible general actions, followed by specific properties listed according to a grid of 11 disease types. Finally, potential substitutes for the substances are given.

The Canon contains seven rules for experimenting with new drugs, taken partly from Galen.

1. "The drug must be free from any acquired quality"; for example from being exposed to heat or cold or stored in close proximity to other substances.
2. "The experiment must done on a single, not a composite condition"; in other words it should not be tested on a patient who has complex or multiple illnesses.
3. "The drug must be tested on two contrary conditions"; a drug may act directly on a disease but also it may be effective against a different disease by relieving its symptoms.
4. "The quality of the drug must correspond to the strength of the disease...it is best to experiment first using the weakest [dosage] and then increase it gradually until you know the potency of the drug, leaving no room for doubt."
5. "One should consider the time needed for the drug to take effect. If the drug has an immediate effect, this shows that it has acted against the disease itself."
6. "The effect of the drug should be the same in all cases or, at least, in most. If that is not the case, the effect is then accidental, because things that occur naturally are always or mostly consistent."
7. "Experiments should be carried out on the human body [...] the quality of the medicine might mean that it would affect the human body differently from the animal body..."

== Book 3 Special Pathology ==
Book 3 is arranged by body part, progressing from the top of the body to the bottom of the body and covering the function and diseases of each organ, as well as the etiology, symptoms, diagnosis, prognosis, and treatment for each disease discussed. The third book is also divided into several sections, including:

1. Head, Eye, Ear, Nose, Mouth, Throat, Teeth
2. Chest, Lung, Heart
3. Alimentary tract: stomach, intestines; liver, gall-bladder, and spleen
4. Urinary system
5. Conception, Pregnancy, the Uterus, Diseases of women.
6. The Muscles, The Joints, The Feet.
7. Special subjects: The intemperaments of the Brain; Headache; diseases of the Brain, Epilepsy, Paralysis.

The information presented in Book 3 of the Canon of Medicine represents some of Avicenna's most important contributions to several fields of study, including atherosclerosis, pulsology, migraines, cataracts, vasovagal syncope, and neuroscience.

=== Stroke ===
Strokes are described in extensive detail in Book 3 of the Canon of Medicine. First, two causes of stroke are identified: blockage of vessels in the brain, and blockage of the affective spirit of the brain, a cause that can only be explained using theories on humoral medicine. The blockage of vessels is then further subdivided into two sub-types: collapse and ischemia.[11]

Following this description of the causes of stroke, Avicenna discusses how the blocking agents are derived from the blood or phlegm humors, and how these are most abundant in people with wet and cold natures. Book 3 of the Canon of Medicine also lists several manifestations of stroke: asphyxia, hemiplegia, "headache with jugular vein engorgement, dizziness, vertigo, darkened vision, tremor, anxiety, weakness, grinding teeth during sleep, and dark urine with particles", and it distinguishes between the different causes and types of stroke: cold stroke, coma, subarachnoid hemorrhage, and trauma. Finally, Book 3 discusses several treatments for stroke including the use of herbal medicines and "non-pharmacological interventions such as venesection and dry or wet cupping on the lower neck and upper back". While the accounts of the causes and treatments of stroke are based upon theories of humoral medicine, these descriptions are still similar to the modern understanding of strokes.

=== Neuroscience ===
Book 3 also contains an extensive chapter about neuroscience, which "begins by explaining the structure and function of the nervous system, ...parts of the brain, the spinal cord, the ventricles, meninges, nerves and roots, ... [and] neurological and neuropsychological disorders, including signs and symptoms and treatment strategies".

Furthermore, several specific neurological conditions are described, including: epilepsy, apoplexy and stroke, paralysis, vertigo, spasm, wry mouth, tremor, meningitis, amnesia and dementia, head injuries and traumas, hysteria and conversion disorder, fainting and stupor, nervous tic, sexual disorders, love sickness, delusion and hallucination, insomnia, sopor, nightmare, mania and psychosis, melancholia, paranoia, asthenia, hydrocephalus, and sciatica. Book 3 of the Canon of Medicine also describes fifteen kinds of headaches, as well as descriptions of treatments for each of these conditions that are divided into three steps:

1. Change of lifestyle
2. Simple medicines
3. Compound medicines

Surgical intervention and other non-pharmacological strategies were also recommended in some cases, such as electrical shocks to treat epilepsy.

== Book 4 Special Diseases Involving More Than One Member ==
Book 4 covers diseases that affect the whole body such as fevers or poisons, or conditions that could happen to any part of it such as wounds or bone fractures. The book "concludes with a treatise on personal hygiene, emphasizing care of the hair, skin, nails, body odor, and the treatment of overweight or underweight persons."

In Book 4 – as with other ancient Islamic medical writings – large sections were devoted to covering fevers in great detail. Several types of fevers were distinguished, partly based on the location of the factors causing each specific illness:

1. Ephemeral (involving the pneuma)
2. Putrid (putrefaction of humoral residues)
3. Hectic (occurring in a major organ)

Each of these classifications were further subdivided: for example, Avicenna also listed 23 different types of ephemeral fevers in Book 4 of the Canon of Medicine.

== Book 5 Formulary ==
Book 5 (the Formulary) lists 650 compound drugs, attributing them to various Arabic, Indian and Greek sources. Avicenna added comments, highlighting differences between recipes from different sources, and sometimes giving his recipe. He also gave his opinion of the effectiveness (or ineffectiveness) of some remedies and gave details of where particular ingredients came from and how they were prepared. He favoured proven remedies which had been tested through experience, cautioning that compounds could have unexpected or much stronger effects than might be expected from the effects of the individual components.

== Legacy and reception ==
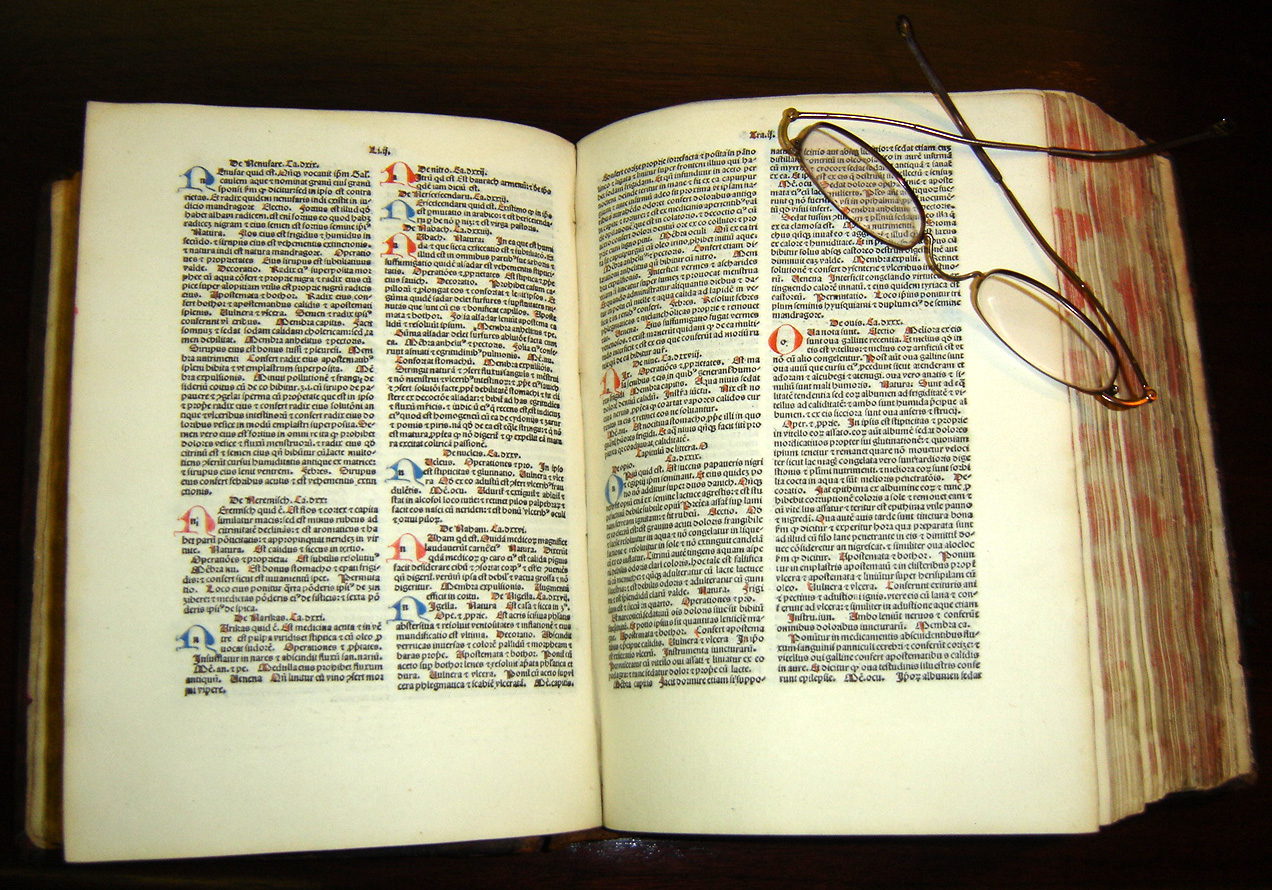
A Latin copy of the Canon of Medicine, dated 1484, located at the P.I. Nixon Medical Historical Library of the University of Texas Health Science Center at San Antonio

The Qanun was translated into Latin as Canon medicinae by Gerard of Cremona. (Confusingly, there appear to have been two men called Gerard of Cremona, both translators of Arabic texts into Latin. Ostler states that it was the later of these, also known as Gerard de Sabloneta, who translated the Qanun (and other medical works) into Latin in the 13th century.) The encyclopaedic content, systematic arrangement, and combination of Galen's medicine with Aristotle's science and philosophy helped the Canon enter European scholastic medicine. Medical scholars started to use the Canon in the 13th century, while university courses implemented the text from the 14th century onwards. The Canon's influence declined in the 16th century as a result of humanists' preference in medicine for ancient Greek and Roman authorities over Arabic authorities, although others defended Avicenna's innovations beyond the original classical texts. It fell out of favour in university syllabi, although it was still being taught as background literature as late as 1715 in Padua.

The earliest known copy of volume 5 of the Canon of Medicine (dated 1052) is held in the collection of the Aga Khan and is housed in the Aga Khan Museum in Toronto, Ontario, Canada. The earliest printed edition of the Latin Canon appeared in 1472, but covering only book three. Soon after, eleven complete incunables were published, followed by fourteen more Latin editions in the 16th century until 1608.

In addition to Latin, the Canon of Medicine was translated into Hebrew by Nathan ha-Meati during the 13th century, and complete translations were also made into Turkish and Persian during the 18th century.

William Osler described the Canon as "the most famous medical textbook ever written," noting that it remained "a medical bible for a longer time than any other work."

George Sarton wrote in the Introduction to the History of Science:

"The Qanun is an immense encyclopedia of medicine. It contains some of the most illuminating thoughts pertaining to distinction of mediastinitis from pleurisy; contagious nature of phthisis; distribution of diseases by water and soil; careful description of skin troubles; of sexual diseases and perversions; of nervous ailments."

== See also ==
- Al-Tasrif
- Medical literature
- The Book of Healing
- Al-Nijat

== Notes and references ==
Sources

- Abokrysha Noha (2009). "Ibn Sina (Avicenna) on Pathogenesis of Migraine Compared With the Recent Theories". Headache: The Journal of Head and Face Pain. 49 (6): 923–927. doi:10.1111/j.1526-4610.2009.01394.x. PMID 19562830.
- Avicenna (1999). The Canon of Medicine (al-Qānūn fī'l-ṭibb), vol. 1. Laleh Bakhtiar (ed.), Oskar Cameron Gruner (trans.), Mazhar H. Shah (trans.). Great Books of the Islamic World. ISBN 978-1-871031-67-6.
- Avicenna, 980–1037. (1973). A treatise on the Canon of medicine of Avicenna, incorporating a translation of the first book,. Gruner, Oskar Cameron,. [New York],: [AMS Press]. ISBN 0404112315. OCLC 677548.
- Celik Turgay (2009). "Time to remember Avicenna for his contribution to pulsology". International Journal of Cardiology. 144 (3): 446. doi:10.1016/j.ijcard.2009.03.082. PMID 19346014.
- Choopani R, Mosaddegh M, Gir AA, Emtiazy M (2012). "Avicenna (Ibn Sina) aspect of atherosclerosis". Int J Cardiol. 156: 330. doi:10.1016/j.ijcard.2012.01.094. PMID 22357428.
- Musallam, B. "AVICENNA x. Medicine and Biology". Encyclopædia Iranica. Retrieved 10 November 2019.
- Nejabat M, Maleki B, Nimrouzi M, Mahbodi A, Salehi A (2012). "Avicenna and cataracts: a new analysis of contributions to diagnosis and treatment from the canon". Iran Red Crescent Med J. 14: 265–70. PMC 3398632. PMID 22829984..
- Pormann, Peter E.; Savage-Smith, Emilie (2007). Medieval Islamic Medicine. Washington, D.C.: Georgetown University Press. ISBN 978-1-58901-161-8.
- Shoja MM, Tubbs RS, Loukas M, Khalili M, Alakbarli F, Cohen-Gadol AA (May 2009). "Vasovagal syncope in the Canon of Avicenna: the first mention of carotid artery hypersensitivity". Int. J. Cardiol. 134: 297–301. doi:10.1016/j.ijcard.2009.02.035. PMID 19332359..
- Zargaran Arman, Mehdizadeh Alireza, Zarshenas Mohamad M., Mohagheghzadeh Abdolali (2012). "Avicenna (980–1037 AD)". Journal of Neurology. 259 (2): 389–390. doi:10.1007/s00415-011-6219-2. PMID 21887514.
- Zargaran A, Zarshenas MM, Karimi A, Yarmohammadi H, Borhani-Haghighi A (2013). "Management of stroke as described by Ibn Sina (Avicenna) in the Canon of Medicine". Int J Cardiol. 169: 233–7. doi:10.1016/j.ijcard.2013.08.115. PMID 24063916..
