= Ibn Duqmaq =

Egyptian historian and biographer (1349–1406)

- Born: Sarim al-Din Ibrahim bin Mahammad bin Aidmar bin Duqmaq al-Ala’i (صارم الدين ابراهيم بن محمد بن ايدمر بن دقماق العلائي); 1349; Cairo, Egyptian Mamluk Sultanate
- Died: 1406 (aged 56–57); Cairo, Egyptian Mamluk Sultanate
- Occupations: historian, biographer, writer, soldier
- Relatives: Mahammad bin Aidmar (father); Aidmar Al-Ala’i (grandfather)
- Writing career
- Notable work: Al-Intisar li-Wasita Aqd Al-Amsar

Sarim al-Din Ibrahim bin Mahammad bin Aidmar bin Duqmaq al-Ala’i (Egyptian Arabic: صارم الدين ابراهيم بن محمد بن ايدمر بن دقماق العلائي) (1406 – 1349), known as Ibn Duqmaq al-Qahiri al-Hanafi, was a medieval Egyptian historian and biographer from the Mamluk era. Many historians made a mistake when they indicated that Duqmaq was his paternal grandfather, and that the historian is Ibrahim bin Mahammad bin Duqmaq. Ibn Duqmaq wrote about 200 books on history, both authored and copied. He was known for being fair in his writing.

== Family ==
As for his father, Mahammad bin Aidmar, we do not know the truth about him, as the sources do not provide us with sufficient information about him, except for what we found from Al-Asqalani that his father Mahammad was “Dawadar” Badr Al-Din, the son of Al-Qalanisi's cousin, and that he died on the 21 of Shawwal in the year 761 AH / 1359 AD.

As for his grandfather Aidmar Al-Ala’i, who was nicknamed Duqmaq, we also did not find much about his life and his impact except what Ibn Hajar Al-Asqalani mentioned, that he was a leader of the Egyptian Military Union at that time and he was one of the best leaders, and he remained so until he died in Rajab in the year 734 AH / 1333 AD.

== Early life ==
Ibn Duqmaq Sarim al-Din Ibrahim, as historical sources agree that he was born around the year 750 AH / 1349 AD and died around the year 809 AH / 1406 AD. We did not find anyone who disagreed with this date except Al-Suyuti and Haji Khalifa, who mentioned the date of his death as around the year 790 AH / 1388 AD. Although Haji Khalifa returns to make up his mind, he refers more than once in his book to his death in the year 809 AH / 1406 AD.

We did not find in most of the sources that translated Ibn Duqmaq the principle of his professional or scientific life in any detail. Rather, all we found about him were simple fragments that give us a clear idea of the background of his upbringing. Most of these sources indicate that Ibn Duqmaq, was at the beginning of his career a soldier, then knowledge became endearing to him, so he sought it and learned a little with a group of Hanafi jurists, and he turned to literature. Then history became endearing to him, and he leaned towards it in its entirety.

Al-Sakhawi mentioned him and said about him:

“His writings on history were useful and good, his knowledge was extensive, his beliefs were good, and he did not have obscenity in his words or in his writing.”

Al-Maqrizi mentioned him and said about him:

“He devoted himself to history to the point where he wrote about two hundred books of his own and other works. He wrote a large history of the years, another of the letters, and news of the state in two volumes, a biography of al-Zahir Barquq, and the Hanafi classes for which he was tested. He was knowledgeable of the affairs of the state, studying all of its news, recalling the biographies of its princes, and participating in others well."

== Crisis ==
A tribulation befell Ibn Duqmaq, from which he suffered because of what was attributed to him for his accusation against Imam Al-Shafi’i. The details of the matter are that in the year 804 AH / 1401 AD, there were words found against Imam Al-Shafi’i in Ibn Duqmaq's handwriting, so he was questioned about this in the court of Judge Al-Shafi’i, and he stated that he had copied it from a book owned by the Alwad Al-Tarabulsi. So Judge Galal al-Din sentenced him to beating and imprisonment.

== Culture ==
Sarim al-Din Ibn Duqmaq was not well-versed in literary and linguistic culture that would make him a historian with a degree of eloquence and proficiency in the Arabic language, although, as some historians mentioned, he was prolific in his historical writings, as Al-Sakhawi said about him, quoting Al-Maqrizi:

"He wrote more than two hundred books."

There is no doubt that Ibn Duqmaq, who lived in the Mamluk era and was familiar with the affairs of the Egyptian state and influenced by its character, was also influenced to a great extent by the culture of that era, which was dominated by the colloquial nature of writing according to most historians, and the spread of the Egyptian Arabic dialect in that era. Despite this, some historians have described Ibn Duqmaq as not having any obscenity in his speech or in his writing.

== Ethics ==
Historians have unanimously agreed that Sarim al-Din Ibrahim Ibn Duqmaq was a pleasant person, with a lot of humor, good friendliness, and little harshness towards people. Ibn Al-Imad said about him, quoting Al-Maqrizi:

“He was beautiful among the people, had a good eloquence, was very courteous, and guarded his tongue from insulting people. You would not see him disparaging any of his acquaintances, but rather he neglected to mention what was famous about them, such as what one of them would accuse, and he apologized in every way.”

== Professional life ==
Some sources mentioned that in his last days, he assumed the command of Damietta, but he did not succeed there and did not stay there for long. He returned to Cairo, where he died in Dhul-Hijjah in the year 809 AH / 1406 AD, when he was over 60.

== Position among the scholars of his time ==
There is no doubt that Ibn Duqmaq was one of the most prominent historians of his time, given the abundance of his works in writing history and the diversity of his topics. This opinion was reinforced by what was pointed out by Al-Maqrizi (d. 845 AH / 1441 AD), Ibn Hajar Al-Asqalani (d. 852 AH / 1448 AD), and Ibn Taghribirdi (d. 874 AH / 1469 AD), but many historians of that era learned from him and copied a lot from his books and writings.

Shams al-Din al-Sakhawi (d. 902/1496 AD) mentions that his sheikh - by which he means Ibn Hajar al-Asqalani - relied on Ibn Duqmaq and that most of what he transmitted was from his handwriting and from Ibn al-Furat's handwriting from him, which also means that Ibn al-Furat (d. 807 AH/1404 AD) took from Ibn Duqmaq. Likewise, Al-Badr Al-Ayni (d. 855 AH / 1451 AD), and he adds that Al-Badr Al-Ayni almost wrote the entire paper from him in succession.

Ibn Hajar al-Asqalani confirms what was mentioned previously that he met with Sarim al-Din Ibrahim Ibn Duqmaq often and most of what he transmitted from his handwriting and from Ibn al-Furat's handwriting. We cannot fail to mention Al-Maqrizi's mention of his companionship with Ibn Duqmaq and his companionship for many years.

If we look at what was mentioned in the Islamic Encyclopedia, we find that Al-Maqrizi had studied under Ibn Duqmaq for a period of time, as was proven by “Fullers” in the introduction to Ibn Duqmaq's book “Al-Intisar li-Wasita Aqd Al-Amsar,” where he pointed out that although Al-Maqrizi had studied under Ibn Duqmaq was unable to benefit from the works of his teacher, and that Ibn Duqmaq drew from more important sources than those relied upon by Al-Maqrizi, and Al-Suyuti (d. 911 AH) mentioned in the introduction to his book “Hasan Al-Muhadara fi Akhbar Misr wal-Qahira” that he relied on it in writing this book. He wrote many works, including the book “Tabaqat al-Hanafiyyah” by Ibn Duqmaq.

== Works ==
There is no doubt that Ibrahim bin Mahammad bin Aidmar, nicknamed Ibn Duqmaq, was one of the most prominent Egyptian historians of his time. He wrote about two hundred books on history, both authored and transmitted. He was known for being fair in his histories. Despite the abundance of his writings on history and elsewhere, only a few of them remain scattered in the libraries of the world, including:

- "Al-Intisar li-Wasita Aqd Al-Amsar" — Haji Khalifa mentioned it in Kashf al-Zunun, noting that in ten volumes, he summarized a book from it that he called: “Al-Durra Al-Mudhia fi Fadl Misr wa Askandaria.” It is worth noting that the book of Al-Intisar was published by “Fullers”, the fourth and fifth volumes, from a copy in its author's hand, kept by the Egyptian Book House under the number 1244 history, printed in Egypt in the years 1309 and 1310 AH / 1891 - 1892 AD, with lengthy indexes of notable figures, including a lengthy description of Fustat, its markets, mosques, schools, and all its buildings and its streets, as well as Alexandria and its suburbs and a large part of the villages of Egypt and its country.
- "Turjuman Al-Zaman fi Tarajem Al-Ayan" — A book on history arranged in letters, mentioned by Haji Khalifa in Kashf al-Zunun, and as a case in the Dictionary of Authors, and the Islamic Encyclopedia in Arabic.
- "Al-Jawhar Al-Thameen fi Sir Al-Muluk wa Al-Salatin" — A book about the history of Egypt until the fall of Sultan Barquq.
- "Al-Durrah Al-Mandida fi Wafiyat Umat Muhammad" — It is mentioned as a case in the authors' dictionary.
- "Al-Durra Al-Mudhia fi Fadl Misr wa Askandaria" — Haji Khalifa mentioned it in Kashf al-Zunun, and it is, as mentioned previously, an excerpt from the book Al-Intisar li-Wasita Aqd Al-Amsar.
- "Aqd al-Jawahir fi Sirat al-Malik al-Zahir" — Haji Khalifa mentioned it in Kashf al-Zunun, and as a case in the authors’ dictionary.
- "Faraid Al-Fawaid" — A book on the interpretation of dreams, mentioned by Haji Khalifa in Kashf al-Zunun, and the Islamic Encyclopedia in Arabic.
- "Al-Knoz al-Makhfia fi Tarajem al-Sufia" — It is mentioned in the Islamic Encyclopedia.
- "Nazm Al-Juman fi Tabaqat Ashab Imamana Al-Numan" — A book in three parts, the first of which deals with the virtues of Imam Abu Hanifa, the second and the third about his companions. Haji Khalifa mentioned it in Kashf al-Zunun, al-Zirakli in al-‘A`lam, and as a case in the Authors’ Dictionary.
- "Yanbu Al-Mazahir fi Sirat al-Malik al-Zahir" — Haji Khalifa mentioned it in Kashf al-Zunun, and also in the Islamic Encyclopedia, which is a shorter version of Aqd al-Jawahir.
- "Nuzhat Al-Anam fi Tarikh al-Islam" — It is a history book arranged according to the years, with its author ending in the year 779 AH / 1377 AD, and it is in about 12 volumes, including a piece from the year 436 to the year 552 AH in “Ghouta” in the author's handwriting, another piece from the year 628 to the year 659 AH in Paris, and from the year 701 to the year 742 AH and from 768 to 779 AH at the Gota Institute and in the Egyptian House of Books, an 80-page piece that begins with the biography of King Mansur Ali from the year 778 to 804 AH.

== See also ==
- Ibn Inabah
