= Muhammad ibn Falah =

Muhammad ibn Falah (1400 in Wasit, Iraq – 1461 in Hoveizeh, Iran) was an Iraqi-born theologian who founded the Musha'sha'iya, a Shi'a sect. He received his theological education in the city of al-Hillah, and there came to believe himself to be the earthly representative of Imam Ali and the Mahdi. He was later denounced as a Kafir (non-muslim) by the Muslim establishment.

His spiritual teachings were codified in a text entitled the Kalam al-Mahdi (The Kalam of the Mahdi), which was written in the style of the Qur'an. He was believed to have been descended from the seventh Shi'a Imam, Musa al-Kazim. Upon his death, his son, Ali ibn Muhammad Musha'sha'iya, took over as leader of the sect, which began a dynastic line of succession.
