= Musha'sha' =

Emirate of Masha'sha'iya

Emirate of Masha'sha'iya إمارة المشعشعية عربستان
- 1435–1736
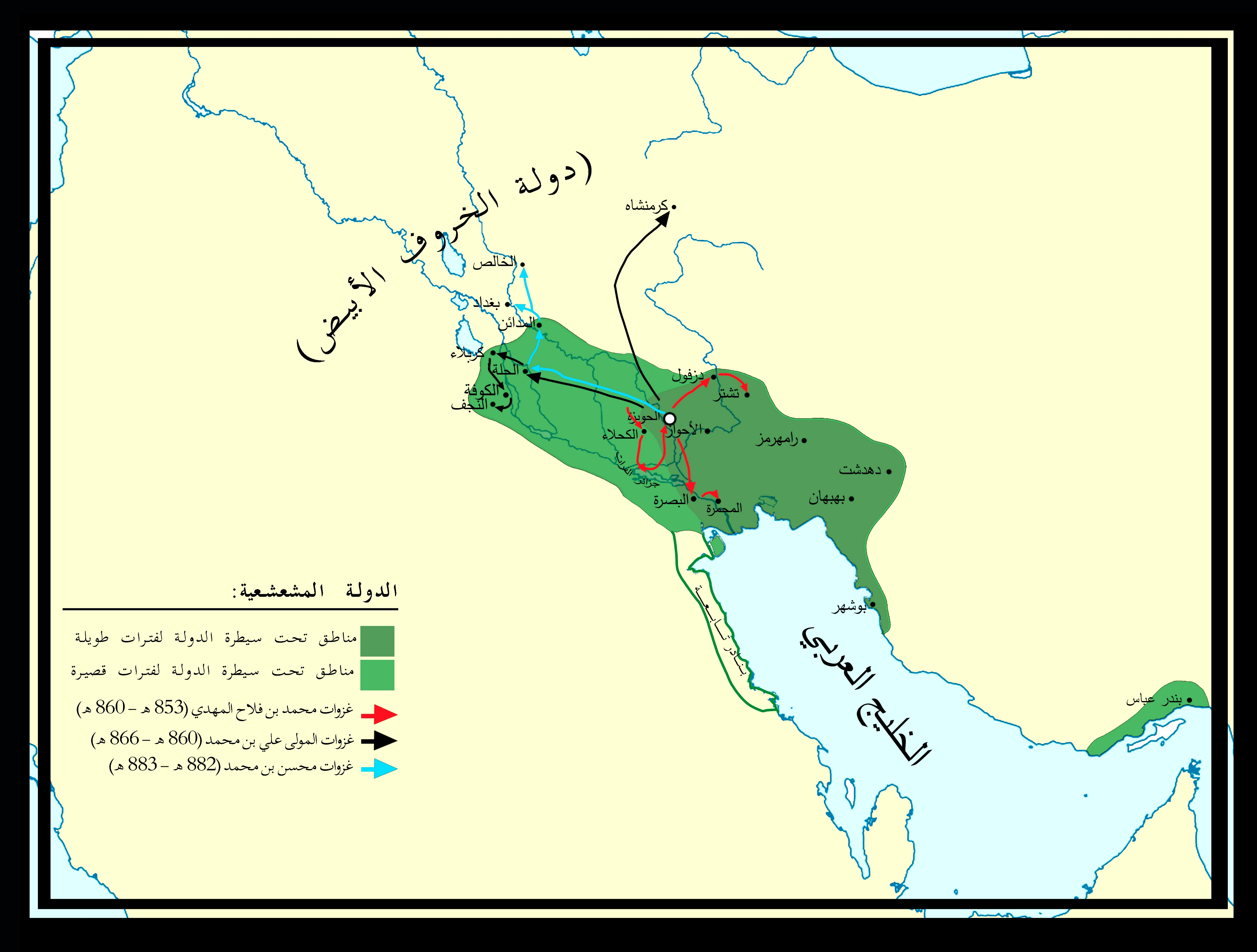
- Arabic map of the Musha'sha'iya dynasty at its greatest extent Long-term influence Short-term influence Invasions between 1450–1457 AD; Invasions between 1457–1463 AD; Invasions between 1477–1479
- Capital: Huwaizah
- Common languages: Arabic, Persian
- Religion: Shia Islam
- Government: Monarchy
- Sayyid Sultan Emir
  - 1436–1461: Muhammad ibn Falah
  - 1719–1736: Muhammad III Ibn Abdullah
Preceded by
Timurid Empire
Qara Qoyunlu
Succeeded by
Safavid Khuzestan
Emirate of Muhammara
Al-Muntafiq

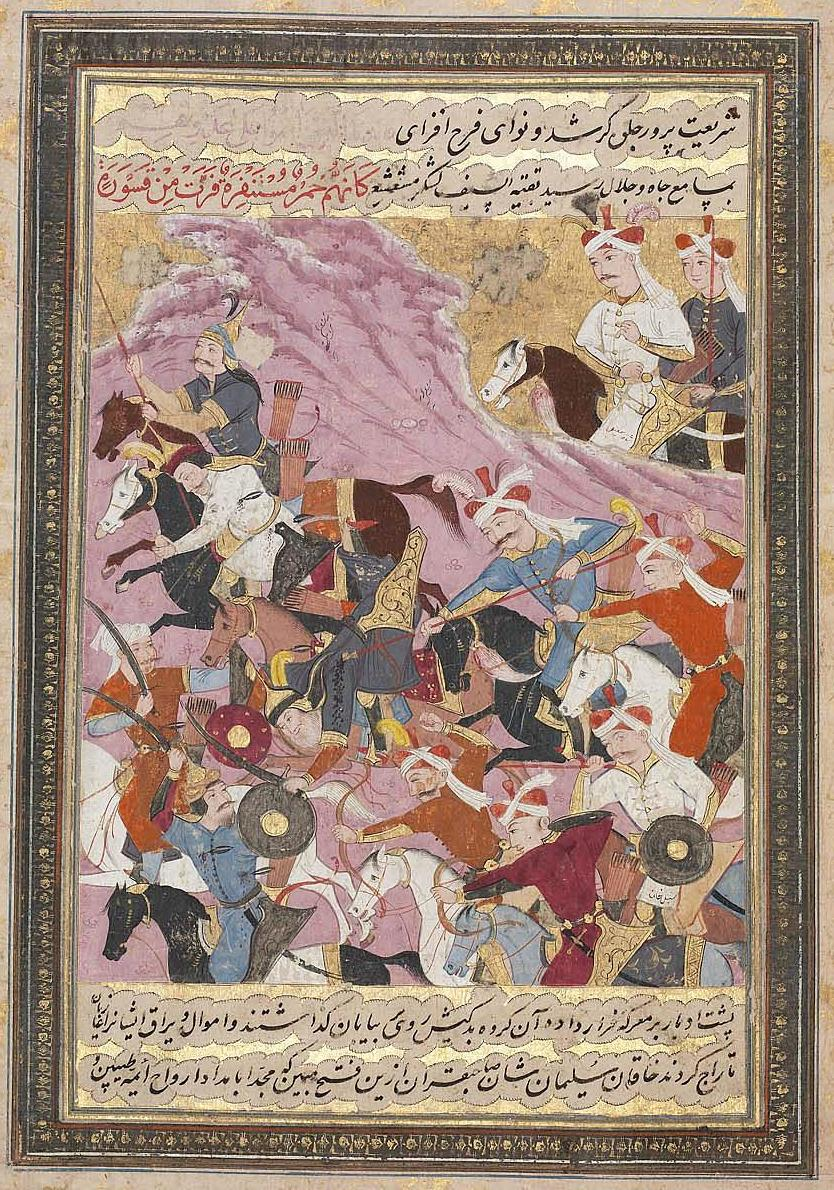
Shah Ismail I (r. 1501-1524) watches his troops defeat the Musha'sha leader Sultan Fayyad. Album-mounted folio of Bijan's history created by Mo'en Mosavver, c. 1688

The Musha'sha' (also spelled Mosha'sha'; Arabic: المشعشعية) were a Shi'i Arab dynasty based in the town of Huwaizah in Khuzestan, ruling from 1435 to 1736. Initially starting out as a tribal confederation, they gradually transformed into a zealous Isma'ili Shi'i dynasty. The independence of the Musha'sha' was put to an end in 1508 by the Safavid shah Ismail I (r. 1501–1524), who claimed to be the only legitimate Shi'i ruler. Following this, the Musha'sha' remained compliant, typically serving as valis or governors under Persian suzerainty for the following centuries.

== History ==
The Musha'sha' were founded and led by Muhammad ibn Falah, an Iraqi-born theologian who believed himself to be the earthly representative of Ali and the Mahdi. From the middle of the 15th century to the 19th century, they came to dominate much of western Khuzestan in southwestern Iran.

Beginning in 1436, Ibn Falah spread his messianic beliefs amongst the Arab tribes of the Meopotamian Marshes along the area of the present-day border of Iraq and Iran, gaining converts in an attempt to forge a strong tribal alliance. In 1441, they succeeded in capturing the city of Huwaizah in Khuzestan, and during the following ten years the Musha‘sha’iyyah increased their strength and consolidated their power in the area around the city and the Tigris. These early military ambitions were fuelled by Muhammad ibn Falah's millenarian theology, which continued to significantly influence the later military campaigns of the Musha‘sha’iyyah decades after his death. Although Muhammed Ibn Falah substantially attempted to expand towards Basra and Wasit in 1454, his campaigns were ultimately unsuccessful

Successors of Ibn Falah were in continual conflict with the Safavid rulers as well as with Arab tribes until overcome by the Safavids in 1508. Internal division caused by the tilling family competing for authority were already happening pre-Invasion. By exploiting the division , with the military superiority of The Qazilbash army, the confrontation in battle at Hoveyzeh the Safavid army managed to kill the leading members of the ruling family in battle. This caused local Arab resistance which the Safavid had reconsidered their tactics instead of crushing them since the geography of the marshes made it harder for a full military occupation.

Due to Safavid reverting to Twelver Shia Islam, the Musha‘sha’iyyah rulling family converted their school of thought for political survival.Twelver Shia Islam had a well established scholarly tradition,Religious Authority, Hadith literature and jurisprudence. Adopting it helped establish a wider scholarly and religious network, the Safavid’s attempting to ally with the Hawza of Najaf which was oldest and to this day the most influential Shia Seminary ,which eventually failed due to the Hawza & Scholars choosing neutrality over choosing sides in the Ottoman and Safavid rivalry. Musha’sha’yyiah’s regained their local authority until the Dynasty Gradually declined and lost its political influence and dominance in the Khuzestan which the Iranian central authority expanded.

Unreferenced sources indicate that their rule ended towards the 19th century with the rise to power of the Banu Ka'b, which, under the leadership of Jabir al-Ka'abi, had become the dominant power in the western region of Iran. However, Momen writes that by the 16th century they were already reduced to being the governors of Khuzestan.

== See also ==
- List of Shi'a Muslim dynasties
- History of Iraq
- History of Iran
- Arabs
- Iranian Arabs

== Sources ==
- Bosworth, Clifford Edmund (1996). The New Islamic Dynasties: A Chronological and Genealogical Manual. New Edinburgh Islamic Surveys. Edinburgh: Edinburgh University Press. ISBN 0-7486-2137-7.
- Luft, P. (1993). "Mus̲h̲aʿs̲h̲aʿ". In Bosworth, C. E.; van Donzel, E.; Heinrichs, W. P. & Pellat, Ch. (eds.). The Encyclopaedia of Islam, Second Edition. Volume VII: Mif–Naz. Leiden: E. J. Brill. pp. 672–675. ISBN 978-90-04-09419-2.
- Matthee, Rudi (2015). "Relations between the Center and the Periphery in Safavid Iran: The Western Borderlands v. the Eastern Frontier Zone". The Historian. 77 (3): 431–463. doi:10.1111/hisn.12068. S2CID 143393018.
