= Umar ibn Ali =

Son of Ali ibn Abi Talib

Umar ibn Ali ibn Abi Talib عُمَر بن عَلِيُّ بن أبي طالِب
- Title: Al-Atrāf (The Elder); Al-Aṣghār (The Younger)

Personal life
- Died: 10th of Muharram, 61 A.H. / 10 October, 680 AD Karbala, Umayyad Caliphate
- Cause of death: Killed in the Battle of Karbala
- Resting place: Imam Husayn Shrine, Karbala, Iraq
- Parents: Ali ibn Abi Talib (father); Layla bint Mas'ud (mother)
- Known for: Being a companion of Husayn ibn Ali

Religious life
- Religion: Islam

Umar ibn Ali (Arabic: عمر بن علي, romanized: ʿUmar ibn ʿAlī), was a son of the fourth Caliph, Ali ibn Abi Talib was one of the children of Ali ibn Abi Talib who accompanied his brother, Husayn ibn Ali, to Karbala and was killed on the day of Ashura. There is a disagreement about whether his name was Umar or Amr al-Asghar (Arabic: عمرو الأصغر). It is said that except for him, Ali had another son called Amr al-Akbar, whose mother was Umm Habib al-Sahba, and was not present in the event of Karbala.

== Lineage ==
Some Sunni sources have mentioned Amr as Amr al-Akbar whose tekonym was Abu al-Qasim or Abu Hafs. Some historical source reported the name of his mother as Al-Sahba (Umm Habib), daughter of Rabi'a al-Taghlibi. Some others have mentioned her name as Layla bt. Mas'ud al-Darami. The Sunni scholar al-Fakhr al-Razi mentioned that Umar was the youngest child of Imam Ali.

== In the Battle of Karbala ==
It is reported that he made war cries on the Day of Ashura and attacked the enemy. He attacked Zahr, the killer of his brother and killed him. The Sunni jurist Akhtab Khwarazm reported him being martyred after his brother Abu Bakr. It is said that first, his horse fell down and then they killed him.
