= Bahmanshir Bridge at Istgah-e Haft, Abadan =

Bridge in Abadan, Iran

Bahmanshir Bridge at Istgah-e Haft پل بهمنشیر آبادان ایستگاه هفت
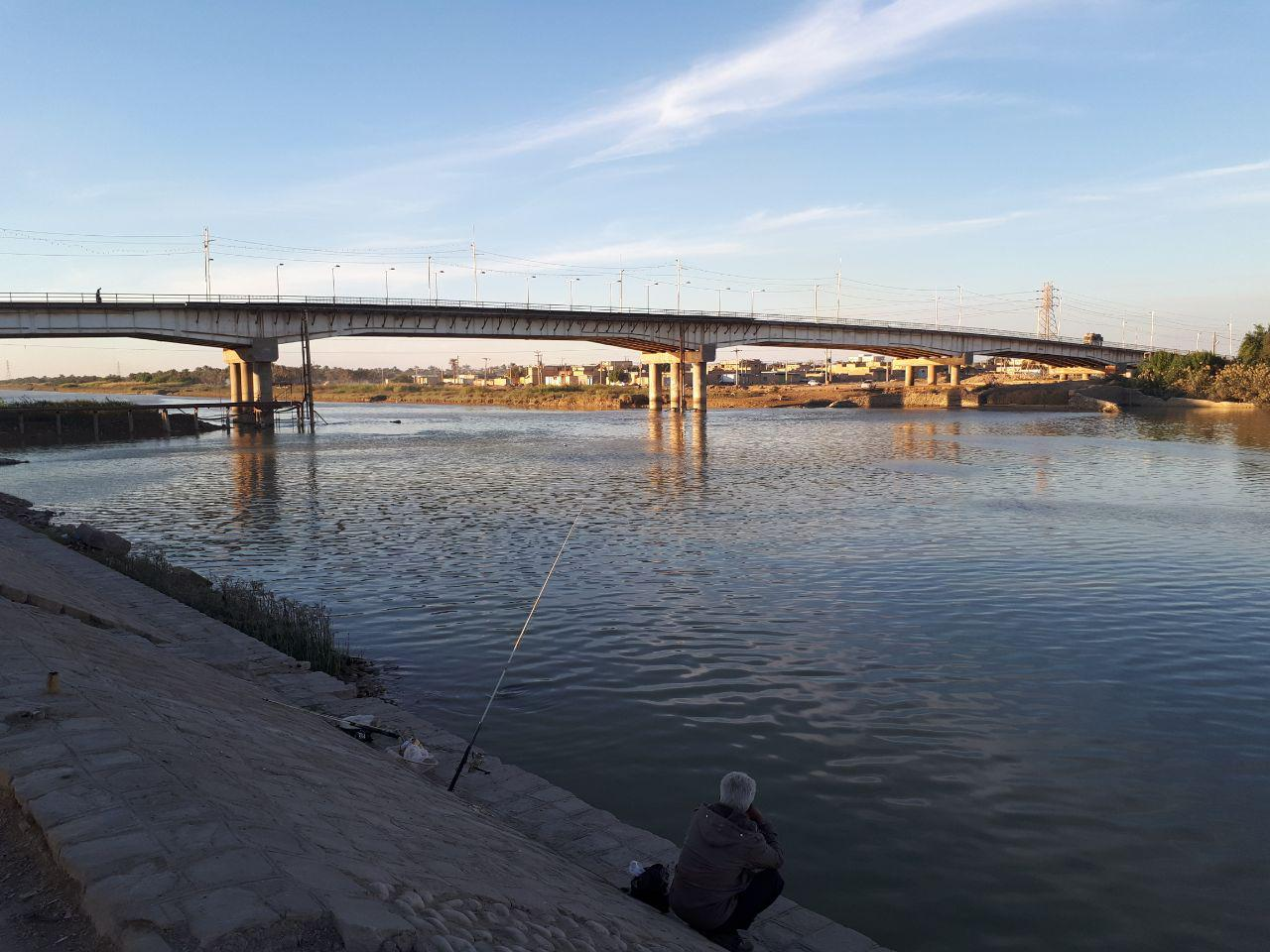
- Crosses: Bahmanshir
- Locale: Abadan, Iran
- Other name: Istgah-e Haft Bridge

Bahmanshir Bridge at Istgah-e Haft (Persian: پل بهمنشیر آبادان ایستگاه هفت, romanized: Pol-e Bahmanshir-e Ābadān-e Istgāh-e Haft), which is commonly referred to as the Istgah-e Haft Bridge (پل ایستگاه هفت, Pol-e Istgāh-e Haft), is a bridge over the Bahmanshir River in the Istgah-e Haft neighborhood of Abadan, Iran.

During the early part of the Iran–Iraq War, this bridge played a critical role during the nearly 11-month Siege of Abadan, as it was one of only two bridges allowing access to Abadan Island, making the key cities of Abadan and Khorramshahr difficult to capture.

On 10 March 2002, the bridge was registered as historical monument #5002 on the list of Registered National Monuments of Iran.

== See also ==
- Ministry of Cultural Heritage, Tourism and Handicrafts
