= Siamak Yassemi =

Iranian mathematician (born 1959)

- سیامک یاسمی
- Born: 1959 (age 66–67); Khorramshahr, Iran
- Education: University of Copenhagen
- Known for: Work in commutative and homological algebra and their connections with combinatorics
- Scientific career
- Fields: Commutative algebra, homological algebra, combinatorics
- Workplaces: Purdue University, University of Tehran
- Thesis: (1994)
- Doctoral advisor: Hans-Bjørn Foxby

Dean of the Faculty of Mathematics, Statistics and Computer Science, University of Tehran
- In office 2013–2021
- Succeeded by: Gholamreza Rokni Lamouki

Siamak Yassemi (Persian: سیامک یاسمی; born 1959) is an Iranian mathematician specializing in commutative algebra, homological algebra, and combinatorics. He is an Associate Professor of Practice in Mathematics at Purdue University in Indianapolis. He previously served as Dean of the Faculty of Mathematics, Statistics and Computer Science at the University of Tehran.

Yassemi's research is in commutative algebra and homological algebra, with connections to combinatorics. His work includes research on monomial ideals, edge ideals of graphs, Cohen–Macaulay properties, and homological dimensions.

Yassemi is a Fellow of The World Academy of Sciences (TWAS), having been elected in 2018 in the field of Mathematical Sciences. According to a profile published by COMSTECH, he became a member of TWAS in 2018 as the first Iranian mathematician to do so. The distinction was also reported by the Mehr News Agency in 2019.

== Early life and education ==
Yassemi was born in 1959 in Khorramshahr, Iran. He completed his PhD in mathematics at the University of Copenhagen in 1994 under the supervision of Hans-Bjørn Foxby.

His undergraduate and master's education was completed in Iran. He received a B.Sc. in mathematics from Shahid Beheshti University in Tehran in 1985 and an M.Sc. in mathematics, specializing in geometry and topology, from the University of Kerman in 1988. He graduated from Alborz High School in Tehran in 1977.

== Academic career ==
Yassemi has held academic and administrative positions at the University of Tehran and the Institute for Research in Fundamental Sciences (IPM). He served as Head of the School of Mathematics at IPM from 2007 to 2009 and later served as Head of the School of Mathematics, Statistics and Computer Science at the University of Tehran from 2014 to 2020.

He served as Dean of the Faculty of Mathematics, Statistics and Computer Science at the University of Tehran from 2013 to 2021.

In 2025, Yassemi joined Purdue University in Indianapolis as an Associate Professor of Practice in Mathematics.

== Research ==
Yassemi works in commutative algebra and homological algebra, particularly on interactions between algebraic and combinatorial structures. His research has included monomial ideals and edge ideals of graphs, Cohen–Macaulay properties, homological dimensions, and related topics.

His publication record includes more than 165 research papers, covering topics in commutative algebra, homological algebra, and combinatorics.

== Honors and memberships ==
- In 2009, Yassemi received the Khwarizmi International Award in Basic Sciences and the COMSTECH International Award for work on homological and combinatorial methods in commutative algebra.
- He was an associate member of the International Centre for Theoretical Physics (ICTP) from 1996 to 2004.
- In 2018, he was elected a Fellow of The World Academy of Sciences (TWAS) in Mathematical Sciences. According to COMSTECH, he was the first Iranian mathematician elected to TWAS.
- In 2019, he was named a Chevalier of the Ordre des Palmes Académiques by France for distinguished efforts in international academic and scientific cooperation, including research projects, student and faculty exchanges, and the organization of schools and conferences.

Yassemi has also visited the Max Planck Institute for Mathematics in Bonn, the Institut des hautes études scientifiques in France, and the Tata Institute of Fundamental Research in Mumbai.

In the 2024–2025 academic year, Yassemi was a Shelly Visiting Professor in the Department of Mathematical Sciences at Carnegie Mellon University in Pittsburgh, Pennsylvania.

In April 2022, Yassemi was a Research Member at the Simons Laufer Mathematical Sciences Institute (then the Mathematical Sciences Research Institute, MSRI) in Berkeley, California, where he collaborated primarily with MSRI Director David Eisenbud.
