= Abadan, Iran =

City in Khuzestan province, Iran

Abadan Persian: آبادان
- City
- Ābādān
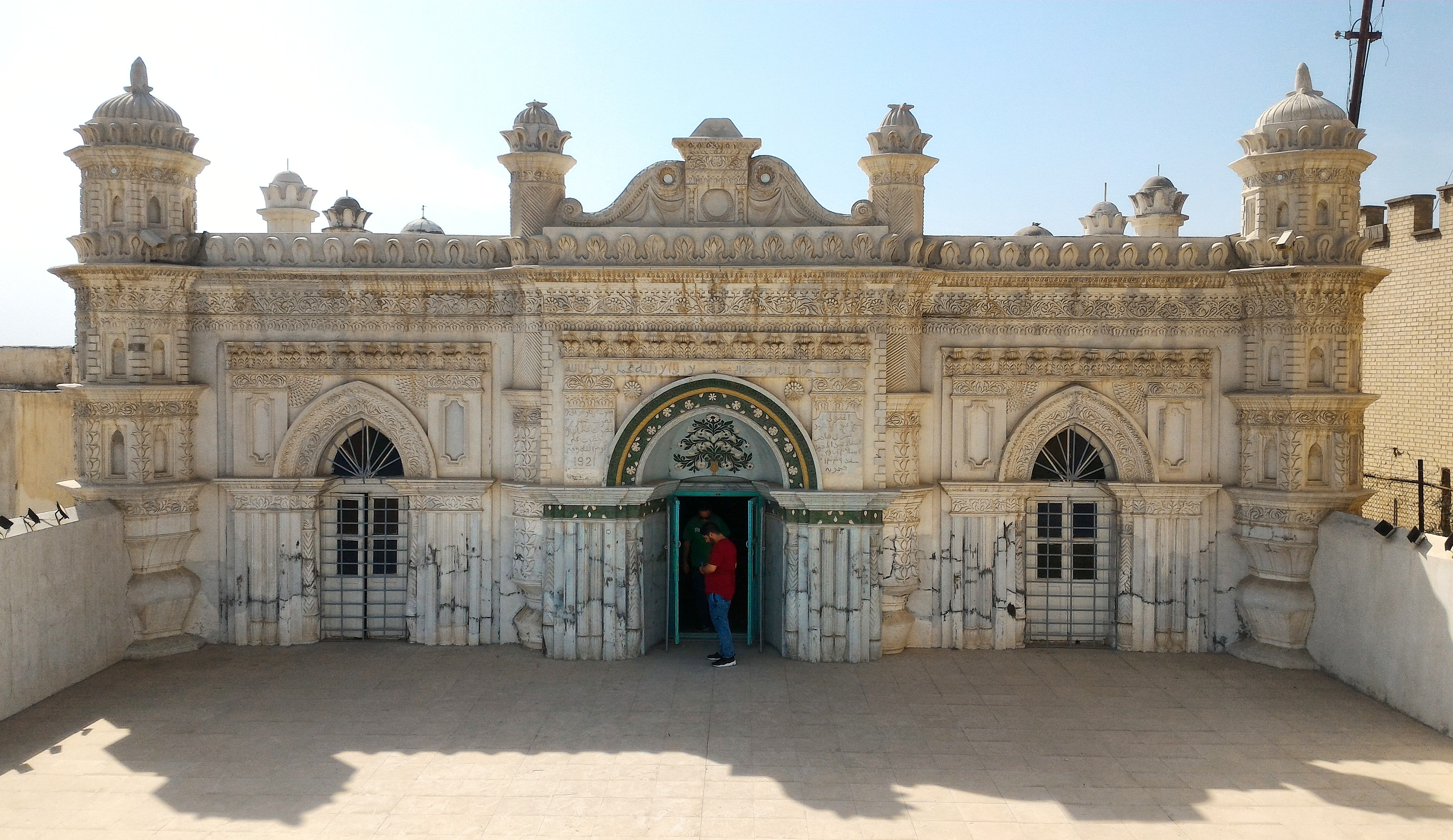
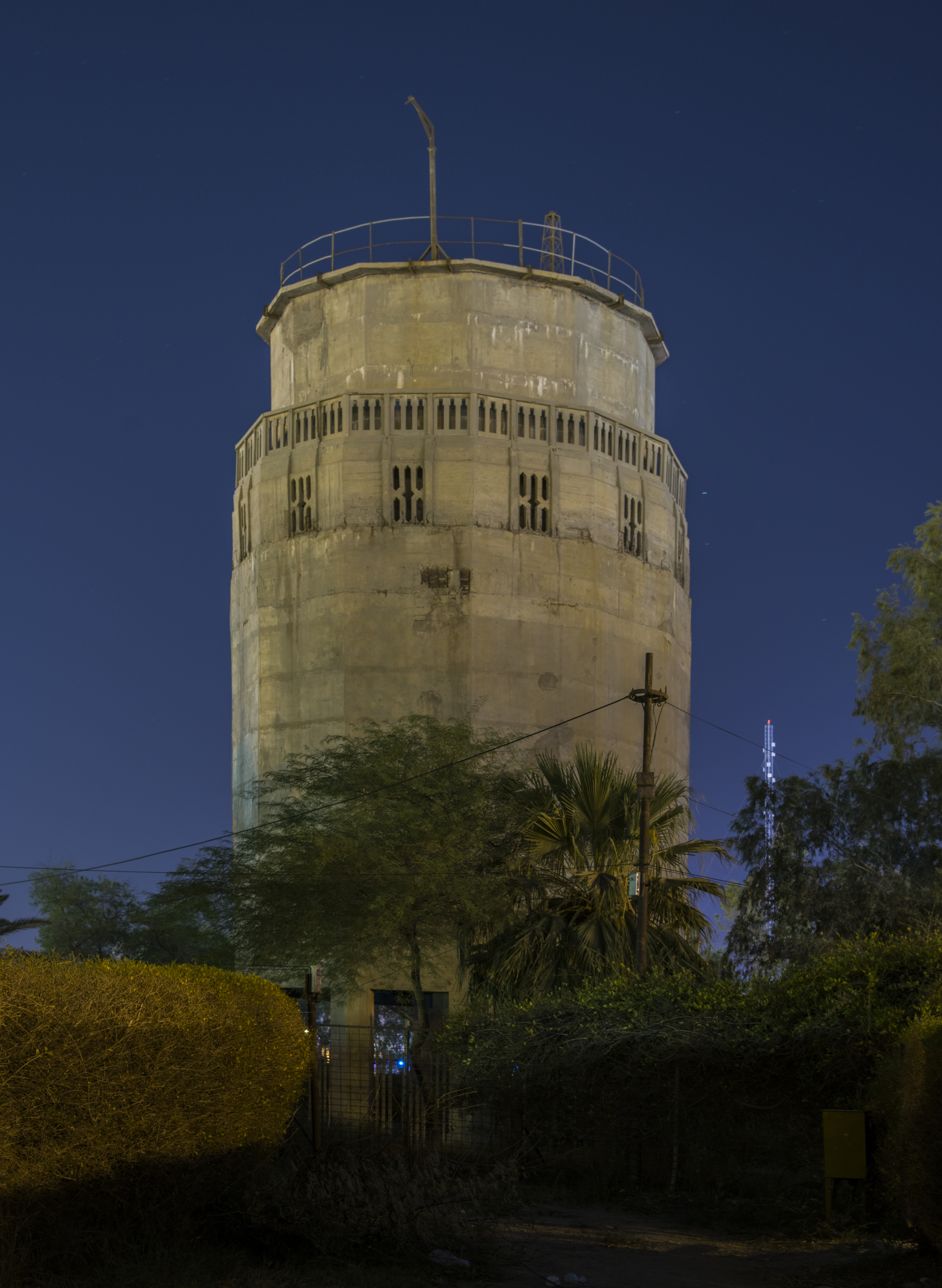
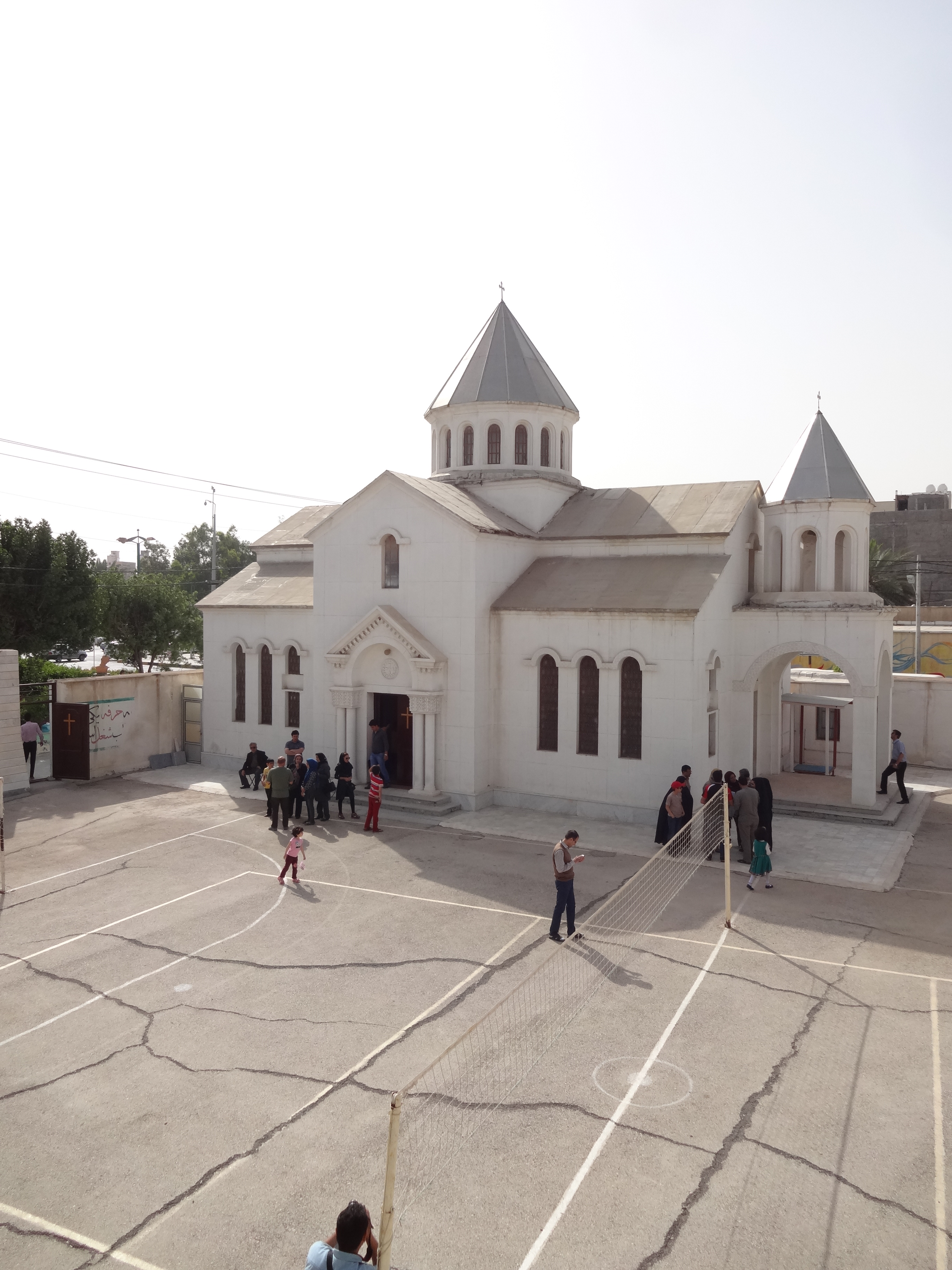

- Location in Iran and Asia Abadan (Persian Gulf)
- Coordinates: 30°20′49″N 48°16′57″E
- Country: Iran
- Province: Khuzestan
- County: Abadan
- District: Central

Government
  - Mayor: Yasin Kavehpour

Area
  - Land: 1,275 km^{2} (492 sq mi)
- Elevation: 3 m (9.8 ft)

Population (2016)
  - Total: 231,476
  - Density: 181.5/km^{2} (470.2/sq mi)
  - Population Rank in Iran: 40th
- Demonym: Abadani (en)
- Time zone: UTC+03:30 (IRST)
- Area code: (+98) 061
- Climate: BSk
- Website: www.abadan.ir/fa

Abadan (Persian: آبادان; pronounced [ʔɒːbɒːˈdɒːn]) (Note: Also romanized as Ābādān; Arabic: عبادان) is a city in the Central District of Abadan County, Khuzestan province, Iran, serving as capital of both the county and the district. The city is in the southwest of the county. It lies on Abadan Island (68 km or 42 mi long, 3–19 km or 2–12 miles wide). The island is bounded in the west by the Arvand waterway and to the east by the Bahmanshir outlet of the Karun River (the Arvand Rood), 53 kilometres (33 mi) from the Persian Gulf, near the Iran–Iraq border. Abadan is 140 km from the provincial capital city of Ahvaz.

== Etymology ==
The earliest mention of the island of Abadan, if not the port itself, is found in the works of the Greek geographer Marcian, who renders the name "Apphadana". Earlier, the classical geographer Ptolemy notes "Apphana" as an island off the mouth of the Tigris (which is where the modern Island of Abadan is located). An etymology for this name is presented by B. Farahvashi to be derived from the Persian word "ab" (water) and the root "pā" (guard, watch) thus "coastguard station").

In Islamic times, a pseudo-etymology was produced by the historian Ahmad ibn Yahya al-Baladhuri (d. 892), quoting a folk story that the town was presumably founded by one "Abbad bin Hosayn" from the Arabian Tribe of Banu Tamim, who established a garrison there during the governorship of Hajjaj in the Umayyad period.

In the subsequent centuries, the Persian version of the name had begun to come into general use before it was adopted by official decree in 1935.

== History ==
Abadan is thought to have been further developed into a major port city under the Abbasids' rule. The city was then a commercial source of salt and woven mats. The siltation of the river delta forced the town further away from water; In the 14th century, however, Ibn Battutah described Abadan just as a small port in a flat salty plain. Politically, Abadan was often the subject of dispute between the nearby states. In 1847, Persia acquired it from the Ottoman Empire in which state Abadan has remained since. From the 17th century onward, the island of Abadan was part of the lands of the Arab Ka'ab (Bani Kaab) tribe. One section of the tribe, Mohaysen, had its headquarters at Mohammara (now Khorramshahr), until the removal of Shaikh Khaz'al Khan in 1924.

It was not until the 20th century that rich oil fields were discovered in the area. On 16 July 1909, after secret negotiation with the British consul, Percy Cox, assisted by Arnold Wilson, and Sheik Khaz'al agreed to a rental agreement for the island, including Abadan. (Note: The agreement gave £1,500 per year and £16,500 in gold sovereigns to the Sheik.) The Sheik continued to administer the island until 1924. The Anglo-Persian Oil Company built their first pipeline terminus oil refinery in Abadan, starting in 1909 and completing it in 1912, with oil flowing by August 1912 (see Abadan Refinery). Refinery throughput numbers rose from 33,000 tons in 1912–1913 to 4,338,000 tons in 1931. By 1938, it was the largest in the world.

During World War II, Abadan was the site of brief combat between Iranian forces and British and Indian troops during the Anglo-Soviet invasion of Iran. Alanbrooke wrote in August 1942 that everything depends on the oil from Abadan, as "if we lost [Persian oil] it could not be made good from America because of the shortage of tankers ... we inevitably lost Egypt, command of the Indian Ocean, and endangered the whole India Burma situation". Later, Abadan was a major logistics centre for Lend-Lease aircraft being sent to the Soviet Union by the United States.

In 1951, Iran nationalised all oil properties and refining ground to a stop on the island. Rioting broke out in Abadan, after the government had decided to nationalise the oil facilities, and three British workers were killed. It was not until 1954, after the British-American led coup they overthrew the democratically elected government, that a settlement was reached, which allowed a consortium of international oil companies to manage the production and refining on the island. That continued until 1973, when the NIOC took over all facilities. After the total nationalisation, Iran focused on supplying oil domestically and built a pipeline from Abadan to Tehran.

Abadan was not a major cultural or religious centre, but it played an important role in the Islamic Revolution. On 19 August 1978, the anniversary of the US-backed coup d'état that had resulted in protests that overthrew the nationalist Iranian prime minister, Mohammed Mossadegh, the Cinema Rex, a movie theatre in Abadan, was set ablaze. The Cinema Rex Fire caused 430 deaths, (Note: Sources give different amounts for the number of people killed, with 400+, "about 370 people", and "almost 400 people.") but more importantly, it was another event that kept the Islamic Revolution moving ahead. At the time, there was much confusion and misinformation about the perpetrators of the incident. The public largely put the blame on the local police chief and also the Shah and SAVAK. The reformist Sobh-e Emrooz newspaper in one of its editorials revealed that the Cinema Rex was burned down by radical Islamists. The newspaper was shut down immediately afterwards. Over time, the true culprits, radical Islamists, were apprehended, and the logic behind this act was revealed, as they were trying both to foment the general public to distrust the government even more, and perceived cinema as a link to the Americans. The fire was one of four during a short period in August, with other fires in Mashhad, Rizaiya, and Shiraz. In September 1980, Abadan was almost overrun during a surprise attack on Khuzestan by Iraq, marking the beginning of the Iran–Iraq War. For 11 months, Abadan was besieged and faced Iraqi artillery and aerial bombardments, but was never captured, by Iraqi forces, and in September 1981, the Iranians broke the siege of Abadan. Much of the city, including the oil refinery, which was the world's largest refinery with a capacity of 628,000 barrels per day, was badly damaged or destroyed by the siege and by bombing. Prior to the war, the city's civilian population was about 300,000, but at the war's end nearly the entire populace had sought refuge elsewhere in Iran.

After the war, the biggest concern was the rebuilding of Abadan's oil refinery, as it was operating at 10% of capacity due to damage. In 1993, the refinery began limited operation and the port reopened. By 1997, the refinery reached the same rate of production as before the war. Recently, Abadan has been the site of major labour activity as workers at the oil refineries in the city have staged walkouts and strikes to protest non-payment of wages and the political situation in the country.

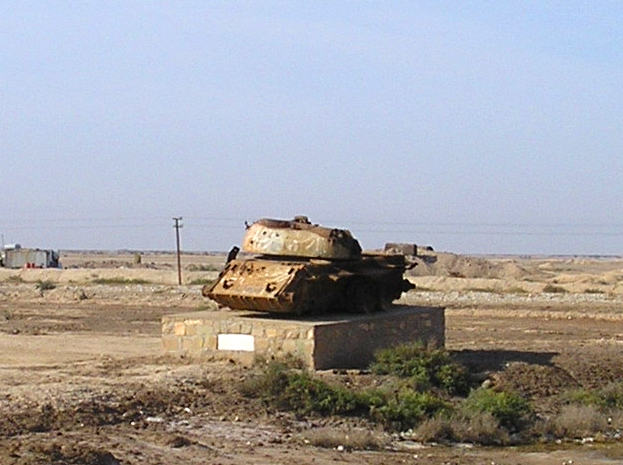
The burnt-out shell of an Iraqi T-54/55 tank, now a monument to the Iran–Iraq War

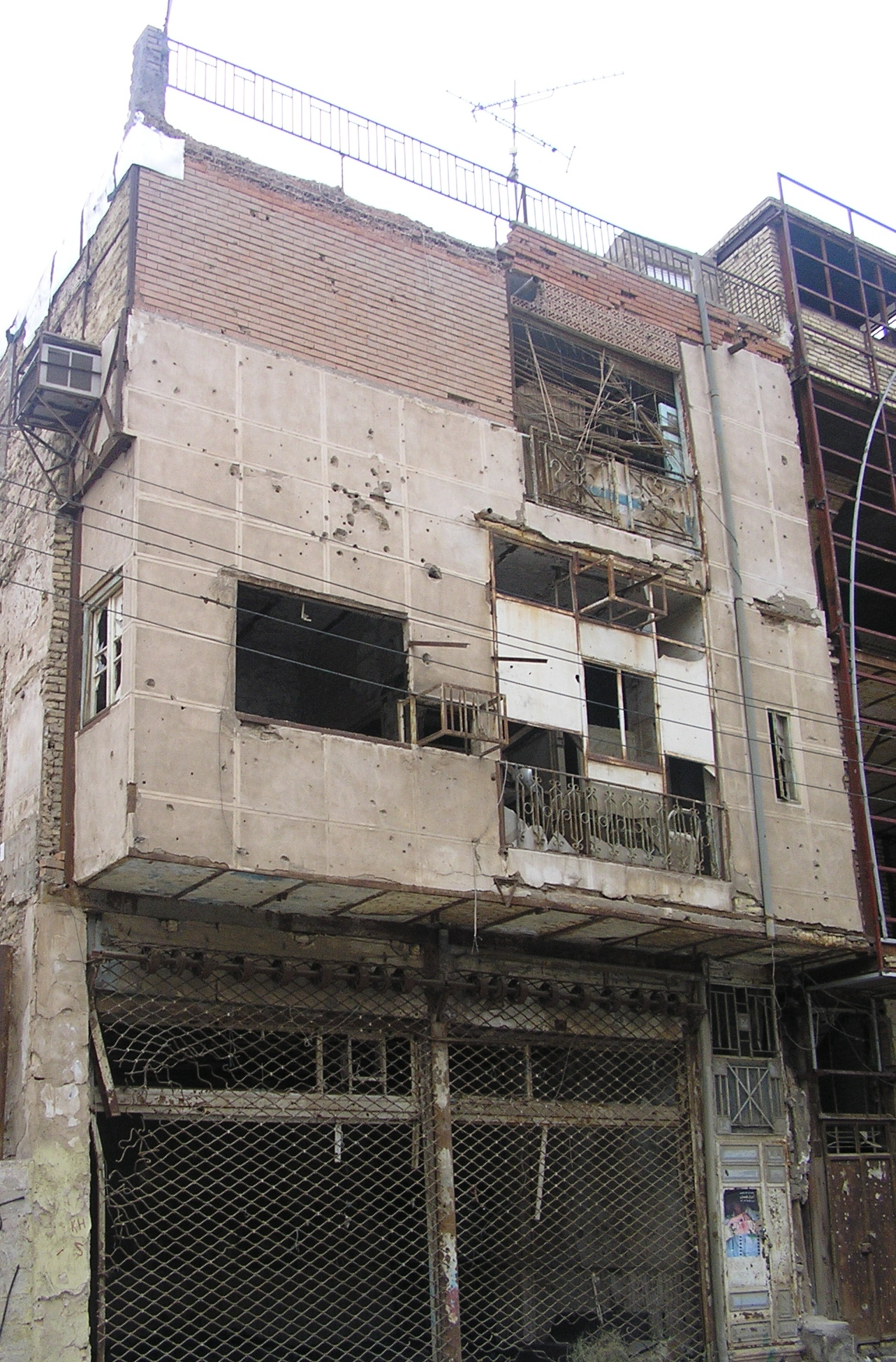
Ruins of a building in Abadan, which had suffered serious damages during the Iran–Iraq War (1980–88), including by Saddam's deadly chemical weapons

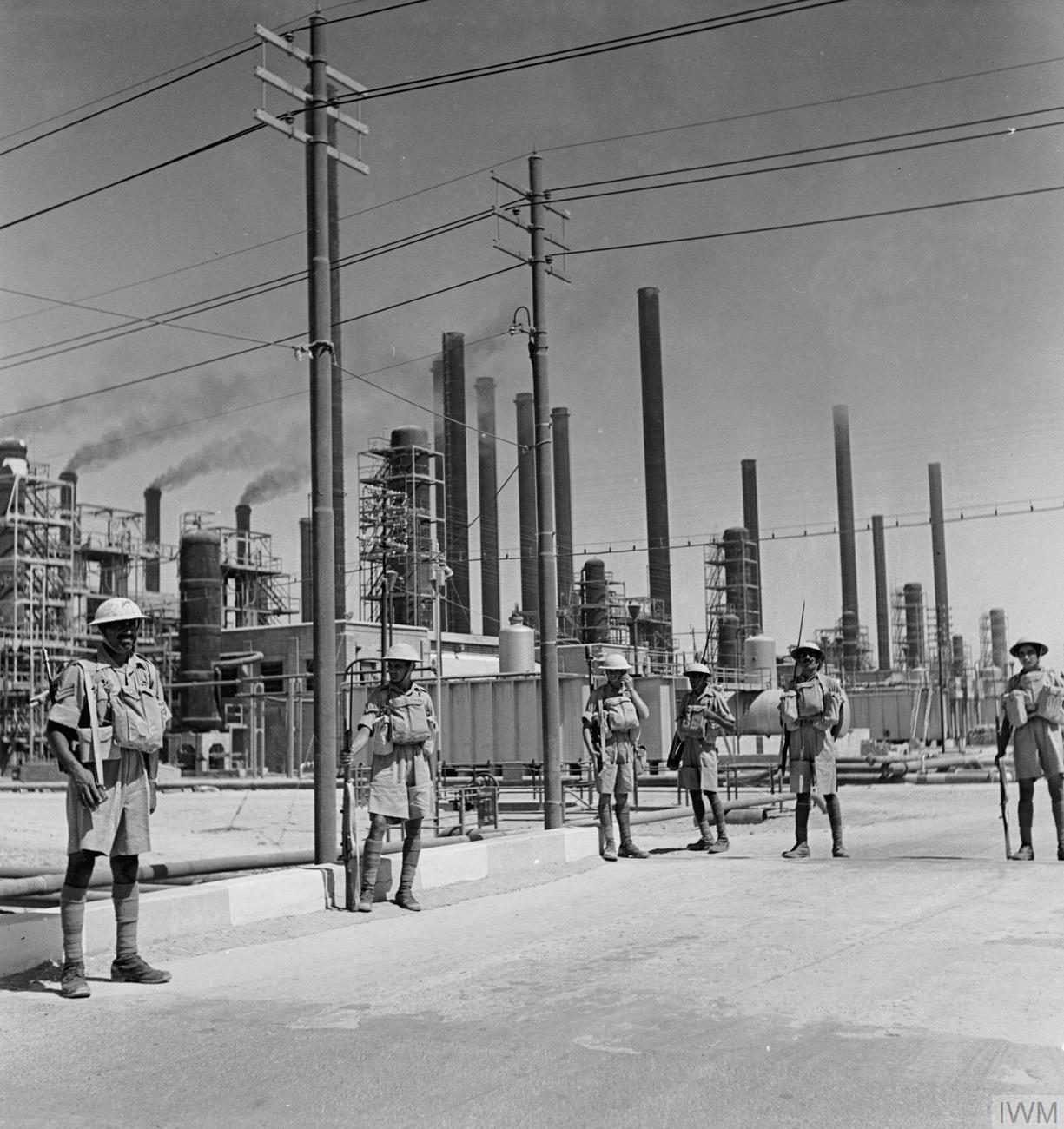
Pictures From Iran E5329

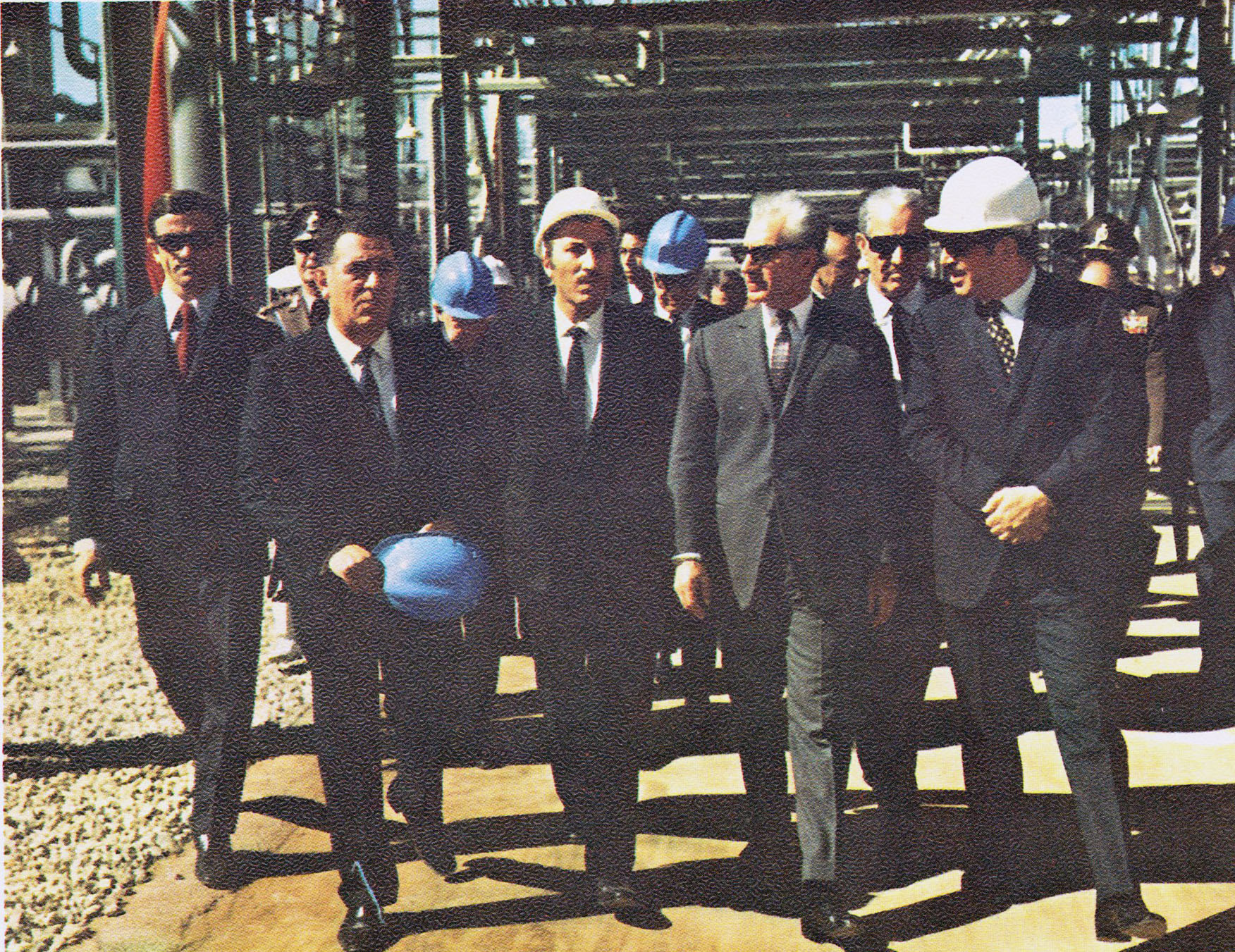
Mohammad Reza Shah visits Abadan Petrochemical

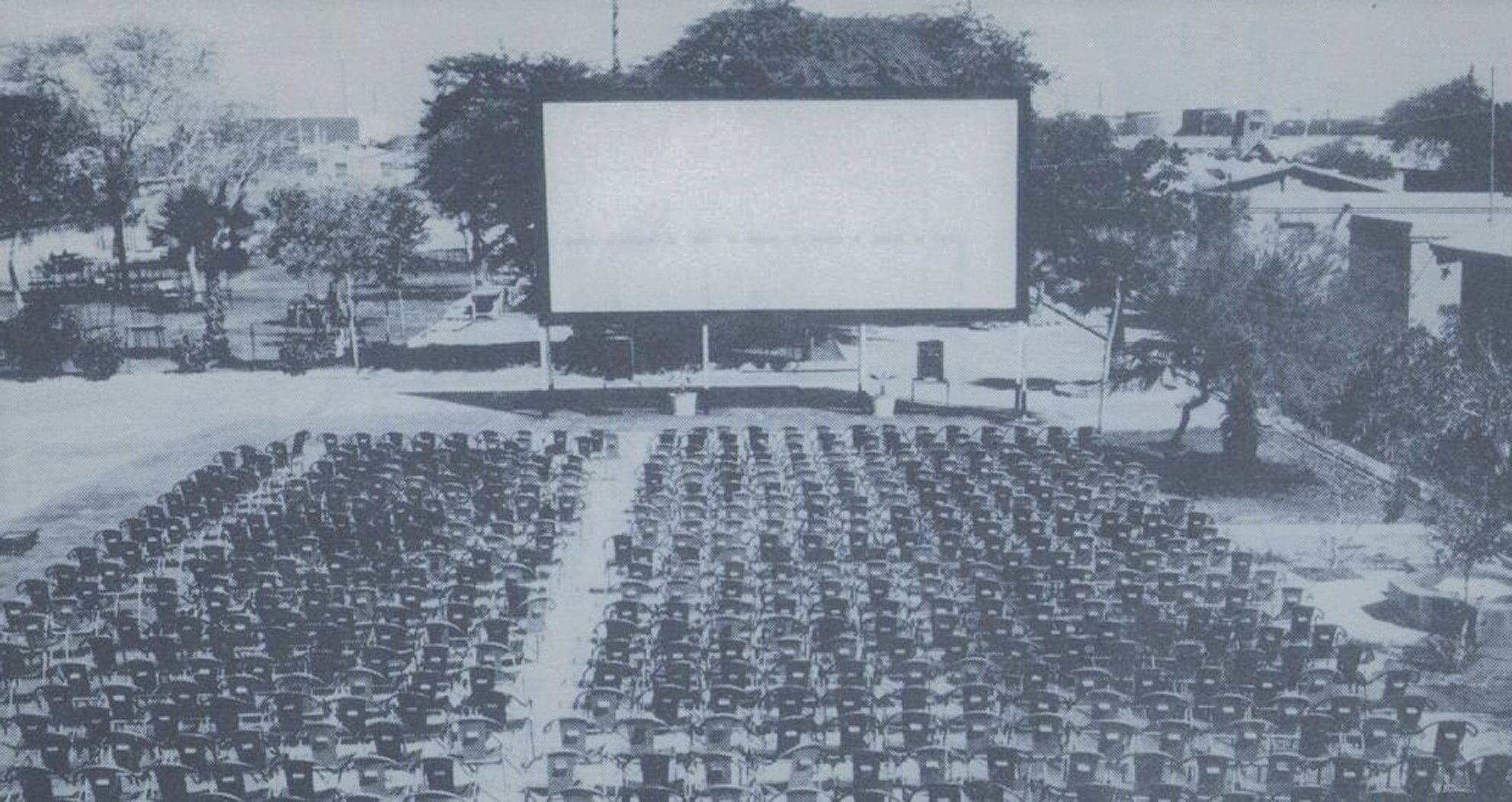
Outdoor cinema in Abadan, 1960s

== Recent events ==
To honor the 100th anniversary of the refining of oil in Abadan, city officials are planning an oil museum. The Abadan oil refinery was featured on the reverse side of Iran's 100-rial banknotes printed in 1965 and from 1971 to 1973. Abadan today has been declared as a free zone city.

== Population ==
Population
Year	People
1910	400
1949	173,000
1956	226,083
1966	272,962
1976	294,068
1980	300,000
1986	6
1991	84,774
1996	206,073
2006	217,988
2011	212,744
2016	231,476

The civilian population of the city almost disappeared during the eight years of the Iran–Iraq War (1980–1988). The 1986 census recorded only 6 people. In 1991, 84,774 people had returned to live in the city. By 2001, the population had jumped to 206,073; the 2006 census put it at 217,988 people in 48,061 households. The following census in 2011 counted 212,744 people in 55,318 households. The 2016 census measured the population of the city as 231,476 people in 66,470 households. Abadan Refinery is one of the largest in the world.

Only 9% of managers (of the oil company) were from Khuzestan. The proportion of natives of Tehran, the Caspian, Azerbaijan, and Kurdistan rose from 4% of blue collar workers to 22% of white collar workers from Esfahan and Shiraz to 45% of managers, thus Arabic-speakers were concentrated on the lower rungs 4% of the work force. In general, Abadan is a city with a majority of the Persian population over 60% who have been influenced by Arabic culture, and the rest of the Azeri population is Kurds and... the native Arabic population is 4%-5% managers tended to be brought in from some distance. There is also a single Armenian church in the centre of the city, Saint Garapet church.

=== Language ===
The linguistic composition of the city:

Abadan linguistic composition
Language	percent
Persian	60%
Khuzestani Arabic	35%
Mixed	5%

== Geography ==
=== Climate ===
The climate in Abadan is arid (Köppen climate classification BWh) and similar to Baghdad's, but slightly hotter due to Abadan's lower latitude. Summers are dry and extremely hot, with temperatures above 45 °C (113 °F) almost daily and temperatures above 50 °C (122 °F) can be almost common. Abadan is notably one of the few hottest populated places on earth and experiences a few sand and dust storms per year. Winters are mildly wet and spring-like, though subject to cold spells with night frost. However, winters in Abadan have no snow (the only recorded snowfall in Abadan was in November of 1007). Winter temperatures are around 16–20 °C (61–68 °F). The world's highest unconfirmed temperature was a temperature flare up during a heat burst in June 1967, with a temperature of 86.7 °C (188.1 °F). The lowest recorded temperature in the city range is −4 °C (25 °F). which was recorded on 20 January 1964 and 3 February 1967 while the highest is 53.0 °C (127.4 °F), recorded on 11 July 1951, 9 August 1981 and 5 August 2022.

Climate data for Abadan (1991–2020 normals, records 1951–present)
Month	Jan	Feb	Mar	Apr	May	Jun	Jul	Aug	Sep	Oct	Nov	Dec	Year
Record high °C (°F)	29.0 (84.2)	34.0 (93.2)	41.1 (106.0)	45.2 (113.4)	49.4 (120.9)	52.2 (126.0)	53.0 (127.4)	53.0 (127.4)	50.1 (122.2)	45.5 (113.9)	37.7 (99.9)	29.8 (85.6)	53.0 (127.4)
Mean daily maximum °C (°F)	18.4 (65.1)	21.4 (70.5)	26.7 (80.1)	33.2 (91.8)	40.2 (104.4)	45.2 (113.4)	46.8 (116.2)	46.9 (116.4)	43.4 (110.1)	36.7 (98.1)	26.8 (80.2)	20.3 (68.5)	33.8 (92.9)
Daily mean °C (°F)	12.9 (55.2)	15.4 (59.7)	20.1 (68.2)	26.1 (79.0)	32.5 (90.5)	36.5 (97.7)	37.8 (100.0)	37.3 (99.1)	33.5 (92.3)	27.7 (81.9)	19.6 (67.3)	14.3 (57.7)	26.1 (79.1)
Mean daily minimum °C (°F)	7.9 (46.2)	10.0 (50.0)	14.1 (57.4)	19.6 (67.3)	24.9 (76.8)	27.8 (82.0)	29.2 (84.6)	28.5 (83.3)	24.8 (76.6)	20.3 (68.5)	14.0 (57.2)	9.2 (48.6)	19.2 (66.5)
Record low °C (°F)	−4.0 (24.8)	−4.0 (24.8)	−1.0 (30.2)	7.0 (44.6)	12.0 (53.6)	17.0 (62.6)	17.0 (62.6)	19.4 (66.9)	14.0 (57.2)	7.0 (44.6)	−1.6 (29.1)	−1.0 (30.2)	−4.0 (24.8)
Average precipitation mm (inches)	32.9 (1.30)	16.2 (0.64)	19.5 (0.77)	12.6 (0.50)	2.7 (0.11)	0.1 (0.00)	0.0 (0.0)	0.0 (0.0)	0.0 (0.0)	7.7 (0.30)	23.2 (0.91)	39.6 (1.56)	154.5 (6.09)
Average precipitation days (≥ 1.0 mm)	4.1	2.7	2.8	2	0.6	0	0	0	0	0.9	3	3.5	19.6
Average relative humidity (%)	69	57	48	40	29	22	24	28	31	43	57	68	43
Average dew point °C (°F)	6.7 (44.1)	5.9 (42.6)	7.1 (44.8)	9.6 (49.3)	10.1 (50.2)	9.3 (48.7)	11.6 (52.9)	13.1 (55.6)	11.6 (52.9)	11.8 (53.2)	9.7 (49.5)	7.8 (46.0)	9.5 (49.2)
Mean monthly sunshine hours	201	205	244	243	297	343	341	342	305	270	214	201	3,206
Mean daily daylight hours	10.4	11.1	12	12.9	13.7	14.1	13.9	13.2	12.3	11.4	10.6	10.2	12.1
Average ultraviolet index	5	6	6	8	9	10	10	10	8	7	5	5	7
Source 1: NOAA NCEI
Source 2: Iran Meteorological Organization (records), Weather atlas(Daylight-UV), Ogimet (April record high)

Climate data for Abadan (1951–2010 averages, records 1951–present)
Month	Jan	Feb	Mar	Apr	May	Jun	Jul	Aug	Sep	Oct	Nov	Dec	Year
Record high °C (°F)	29.0 (84.2)	34.0 (93.2)	41.1 (106.0)	45.2 (113.4)	49.4 (120.9)	52.2 (126.0)	53.0 (127.4)	53.0 (127.4)	50.1 (122.2)	45.5 (113.9)	37.7 (99.9)	29.8 (85.6)	53.0 (127.4)
Mean daily maximum °C (°F)	18.1 (64.6)	20.9 (69.6)	25.9 (78.6)	32.2 (90.0)	39.2 (102.6)	43.8 (110.8)	45.4 (113.7)	45.4 (113.7)	42.5 (108.5)	36.1 (97.0)	26.8 (80.2)	19.9 (67.8)	33.0 (91.4)
Daily mean °C (°F)	12.7 (54.9)	15.0 (59.0)	19.4 (66.9)	25.2 (77.4)	31.2 (88.2)	35.2 (95.4)	36.7 (98.1)	36.3 (97.3)	33.0 (91.4)	27.5 (81.5)	20.0 (68.0)	14.3 (57.7)	25.5 (77.9)
Mean daily minimum °C (°F)	7.3 (45.1)	9.1 (48.4)	13.0 (55.4)	18.1 (64.6)	23.3 (73.9)	26.5 (79.7)	28.0 (82.4)	27.3 (81.1)	23.4 (74.1)	18.9 (66.0)	13.2 (55.8)	8.7 (47.7)	18.1 (64.6)
Record low °C (°F)	−4.0 (24.8)	−4.0 (24.8)	−1.0 (30.2)	7.0 (44.6)	12.0 (53.6)	17.0 (62.6)	17.0 (62.6)	19.4 (66.9)	14.0 (57.2)	7.0 (44.6)	−1.6 (29.1)	−1.0 (30.2)	−4.0 (24.8)
Average precipitation mm (inches)	35.5 (1.40)	20.0 (0.79)	19.2 (0.76)	14.4 (0.57)	3.2 (0.13)	0.1 (0.00)	0.0 (0.0)	0.0 (0.0)	0.1 (0.00)	3.9 (0.15)	20.5 (0.81)	36.4 (1.43)	153.3 (6.04)
Average rainy days	4.7	3.4	3.3	2.2	0.9	0.0	0.0	0.0	0.0	0.6	2.6	4.6	22.3
Average relative humidity (%)	70	61	51	44	33	26	28	31	34	45	58	69	45
Mean monthly sunshine hours	180.6	195.0	222.3	221.6	262.9	292.1	305.1	290.4	290.4	263.4	202.4	182.5	2,908.7
Source: Iran Meteorological Organization (records), (temperatures), (precipitation), (humidity), (days with precipitation), (sunshine)

== Economics and education ==
The Abadan Institute of Technology was established in Abadan in 1939. The school specialized in engineering and petroleum chemistry, and was designed to train staff for the refinery in town. The school's name has since changed several times, but since 1989 has been considered a branch campus of the Petroleum University of Technology, centred in Tehran. Abadan University of Medical Sciences, It was founded by Ministry of Health and Medical Education in September 1941 as a Nursing Faculty and in 2012 it became an independent faculty of medical school. Program study of this school is similar to curriculum that applies most Iranian medical faculties.

Abadan was chosen for constructing a refinery because of its strategic position and proximity to other resources. The Abadan Refinery construction project started in 1909 and its operation began in 1962 by a production capacity of 2500 barrels per day.

There is an international airport in Abadan. It is represented by the IATA airport code ABD. There is a large amount of external investment from East Asian countries that are building oil refineries and developing a lot of real estate.

Today, Abadan is known for its lively fish market where locals buy fresh catch of the day used in the many delicious seafood dishes of the city. Abadan is also part of the Arvand Free Zone, a 155 square kilometer industrial and security zone.

=== Major corporations ===
- Abadan Oil Refining Co.
- Abadan Petrochemical Company
- Afra Arvand
- Homa Chemistry
- Iranol Oil Company
- KPC Karun
- Pars Opal Co.
- Pasargad Oil
- Shirin Diar Arvand Co.
- Tam Arvand Machine
- U-PVC Novin
- Vina Naghsh Industrial Group
- Yekta Tahviyeh Arvand Co.

=== Universities ===
- Abadan University of Medical Sciences
- Islamic Azad University of Abadan
- MehrArvand University
- Petroleum University of Technology
- PNU of Abadan

== Main sights ==
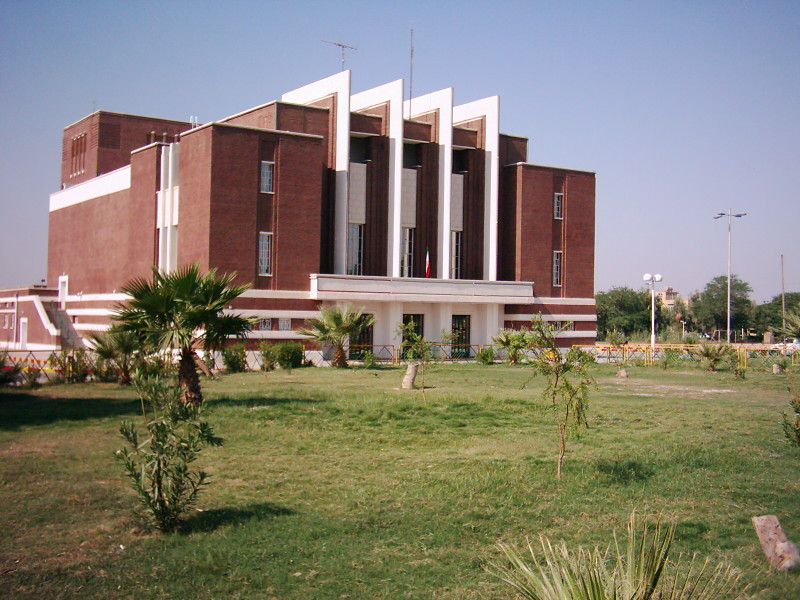
Naft Cinema

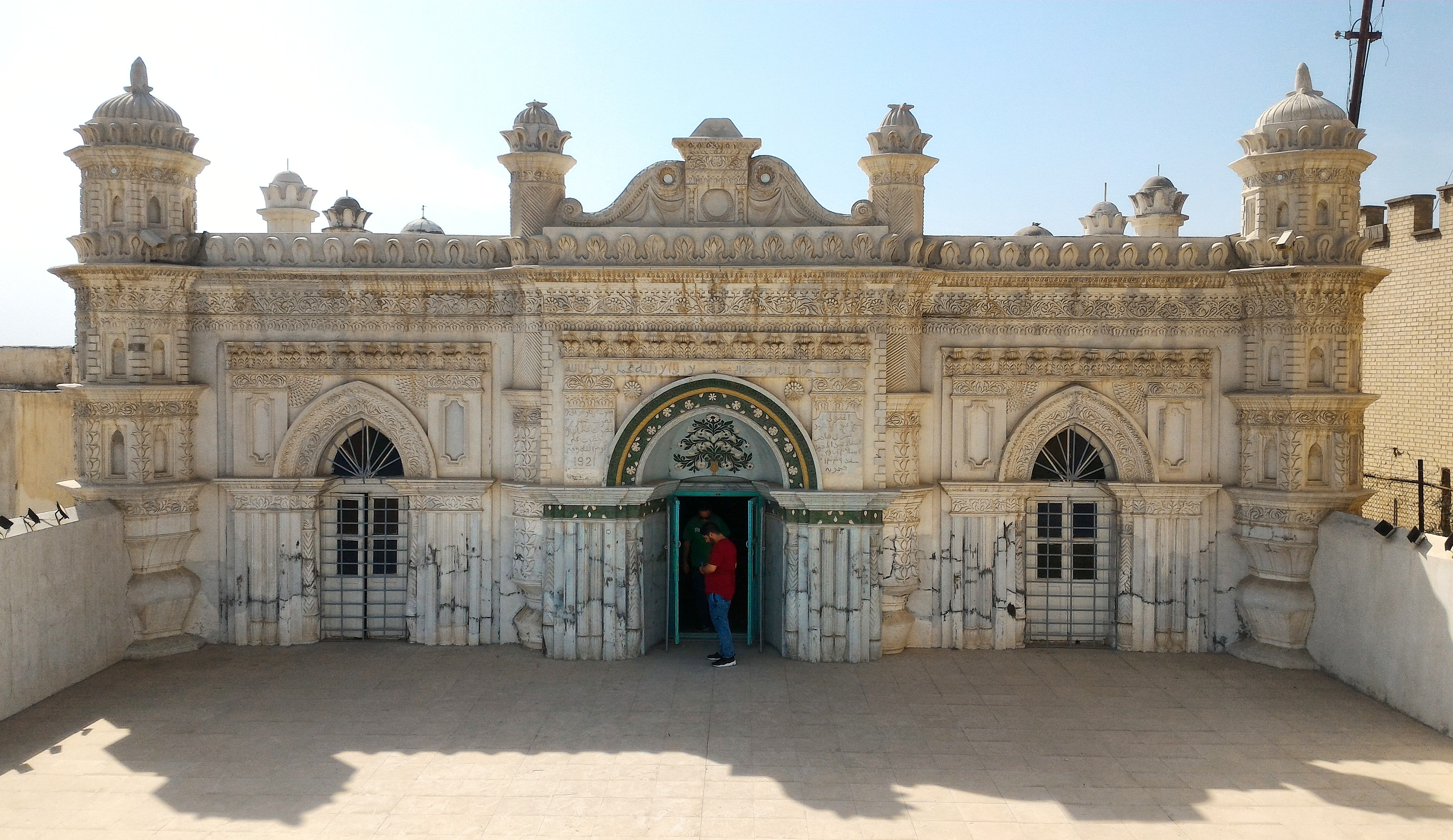
Rengoonie's Mosque

=== Bridges ===
- Bahmanshir Bridge at Istgah-e Haft
- Imam Reza Cable Bridge

=== Mosques ===
- Rangooniha Mosque

=== Museums ===
- Abadan Museum
- Historical and Handwritten Documents Museum
- Abadan Gasoline House Museum
- Oil Museum of Abadan

=== Church ===
- St. Karapet Armenian Church

=== Cinema ===
- Cinema Naft
- Shirin Movie Theater

== Notable people ==
- Ahmad Reza Abedzadeh – football player
- Sussan Babaie – art historian
- Patrik Baboumian – strongman
- Mohsen Bayatinia – football player
- Najaf Daryabandari – writer
- Parviz Dehdari – football coach
- Firoozeh Dumas – Iranian-American writer
- Bizhan Emkanian – actor
- Hamid Farrokhnezhad – actor
- Bahman Golbarnezhad – paralympic racing cyclist
- Farhad Hasanzadeh – poet
- Mehdi Hasheminasab – football player
- Hossein Kanaanizadegan – football player
- Mojahed Khaziravi – football player
- Martik – singer
- Gholam Hossein Mazloumi – football coach
- Parviz Mazloumi – football coach
- Manouchehr Mohammadi – film producer
- Amir Naderi – director
- Hossein Nassim – water polo coach
- Abie Nathan – Abadan-born Israeli peace activist
- Khosrow Parvizi – film director
- Zoya Pirzad – writer
- Hamid Rashidi – lawyer
- Nasser Taghvai – director
- Hossein Vafaei – snooker player
- Cyma Zarghami – Iranian-born American TV producer

== Transportation ==
=== By plane ===
The city is served by Abadan-Ayatollah Jami International Airport with flights on various commercial airlines.

=== By train ===
The nearest railway station is in Khorramshahr, about 10 km north of Abadan. Daytime trains from Ahvaz as well as overnight trains from Tehran and Mashhad are available.

== Sport ==
Sanat Naft Abadan F.C., is a football club currently in the Iranian Football Premier League. Takhti Stadium, the main stadium is the city and the team.

== Sister cities ==
- Karamay, China
- Borujerd, Iran
- Taormina, Sicily

== See also ==
Media related to Abadan at Wikimedia Commons

Abadan travel guide from Wikivoyage

- Abadan Crisis
- Abadan crisis timeline
- Battle of Abadan
- Bechari House
- Bostan
- Iran–Iraq War
- Khorramshahr
- Shadegan
- Susangerd
- Tidal irrigation at Abadan island, Iran

== General and cited references ==
- Abrahamian, Ervand (2008). A History of Modern Iran. Cambridge, UK: Cambridge University Press. ISBN 978-0-521-52891-7.
- Axworthy, Michael (2013). Revolutionary Iran: A History of the Islamic Republic. Oxford, UK: Oxford University Press. ISBN 978-0-19-932226-8.
- Burt, Christopher C. (2004). Extreme Weather: A Guide & Record Book. New York, NY: W. W. Norton & Company. ISBN 978-0-393-32658-1.
- Chelkowski, Peter (1991). "21: Popular Entertainment, Media and Social Change in Twentieth-century Iran". In Avery, Peter; Hambly, Gavin; Melville, Charles (eds.). The Cambridge History of Iran. Vol. 7: From Nadir Shah to the Islamic Republic. Cambridge, UK: Cambridge University Press. ISBN 978-0-521-20095-0.
- Daniel, Elton L. (2001). The History of Iran. Westport, CT: Greenwood Press. ISBN 978-0-313-30731-7. ISSN 1096-2905. LCCN 00-033132.
- Elwell-Sutton, L. P.; de Planhol, X. (1982). "Ābādān". In Yarshater, Ehsan (ed.). Encyclopædia Iranica. Vol. I: Āb-Abd-al-HamĪd. Routledge & Kegan Paul. pp. 51–57. ISBN 978-0710090904. Archived from the original on 16 May 2014.
- Ferrier, Ronald (1991). "18: The Iranian Oil Industry". In Avery, Peter; Hambly, Gavin; Melville, Charles (eds.). The Cambridge History of Iran. Vol. 7: From Nadir Shah to the Islamic Republic. Cambridge, UK: Cambridge University Press. ISBN 978-0-521-20095-0.
- Greaves, Rose (1991). "11: Iranian Relations with Britain and British India, 1798–1921". In Avery, Peter; Hambly, Gavin; Melville, Charles (eds.). The Cambridge History of Iran. Vol. 7: From Nadir Shah to the Islamic Republic. Cambridge, UK: Cambridge University Press. ISBN 978-0-521-20095-0.
- Hein, Carola; Sedighi, Mohamad (2016). "Iran's Global Petroleumscape: The Role of Oil in Shaping Khuzestan and Tehran". Architectural Theory Review. 21 (3): 349–374. doi:10.1080/13264826.2018.1379110.
- Hoeschel, David; Heracleensis, Marcianus; von Karyanda, Skylax; Messenius, Dicaearchus; Characenus, Isidorus (1600). Geographica Marciani Heracleotae, Scylacis caryandensis, artemidoriephesii, dicaearchi messenii, isidori characeni. Augsburg.
- Hoiberg, Dale H., ed. (2010). "Ābādān". Encyclopædia Britannica. Vol. 1: A-ak Bayes (15th ed.). Chicago, Illinois: Encyclopædia Britannica, Inc. pp. 6–7. ISBN 978-0-85229-961-6. LCCN 2002113989.
- Issawi, Charles (1991). "16: European Economic Penetration, 1872–1921". In Avery, Peter; Hambly, Gavin; Melville, Charles (eds.). The Cambridge History of Iran. Vol. 7: From Nadir Shah to the Islamic Republic. Cambridge, UK: Cambridge University Press. ISBN 978-0-521-20095-0.
- Keddie, Nikki R. (2003). Modern Iran: Roots and Results of Revolution (Revised ed.). New Haven, CT: Yale University Press. ISBN 978-0-300-09856-3.
- Lagassé, Paul, ed. (2000). "Abadan". The Columbia Encyclopedia (6th ed.). New York, NY: Columbia University Press. ISBN 978-0-7876-5015-5. LCCN 00-027927.
- MacPherson, Angus (1989). "3: The Economy". In Metz, Helen Chapin (ed.). Iran: A Country Study. Area Handbook Series (4th ed.). Washington, DC: Government Printing Office.
- Mather, Yassamine (19 November 2009). "Workers organise against regime". Weekly Worker. Archived from the original on 18 March 2016.
- Melamid, Alexander (1997). "Abadan". In Johnston, Bernard (ed.). Collier's Encyclopedia. Vol. I: A to Ameland (1st ed.). New York, NY: P. F. Collier.
- NOAA (2013). "Abadan Climate Normals 1961–1990". National Oceanic and Atmospheric Administration (FTP). (To view documents see Help:FTP)
- Satrapi, Marjane (2003). Persepolis: The Story of a Childhood. New York, NY: Pantheon Books. ISBN 978-0-375-71457-3.
- Vadahti, M. (2006). "سرشماري عمومي نفوس و مسكن 1385 (بدون احتساب خانوارهاي موسسه اي و غيرساكن)" [Census of Population and Housing 1385 (excluding institutional households and nomads)]. Archived from the original (Excel) on 14 November 2011.
- Wilber, Donald N. (1984) [1948]. Iran: Past and Present: From Monarchy to Islamic Republic (9th ed.). Princeton, NJ: Princeton University Press. ISBN 978-0-691-00025-1.
