= Haffar =

Canal in Iran

Haffar (Persian: حفّار) is a canal in Iran.

During the early Islamic centuries, the Daylamite Buwayhid king, Panah Khusraw Adud ad-Dawlah, ordered the digging of a canal to join the Karun River, which at the time emptied independently into the Persian Gulf through the Bahmanshir channel, to the Shatt al-Arab waterway (known as Arvand Rud in Iran), the joint estuary of the Tigris and Euphrates rivers. The extra water from the Karun, which, at times during the spring melt, discharged over 27 times the volume of the Tigris-Euphrates water that reaches the Shatt al-Arab) makes the joint estuary more reliably navigable.

The estuary thus created was known as the Haffar, Arabic for "excavated," "dug out," which exactly described what the channel was: a man-made canal. The Haffar soon became the main estuary of the Karun, and remains so to this day, replacing the Bahmanshir.

In the 19th century, the port of Muhammarah was built on the Haffar. In the 1930s, the port was renamed Khorramshahr (q.v.)
