= Hamid Rashidi =

Iranian lawyer and writer (1961–2020)

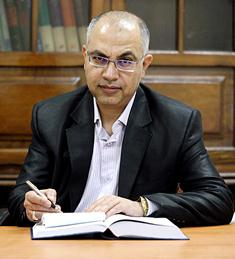
Hamid Rashidi, 2012

Hamid Rashidi (5 December 1961, in Abadan – 25 April 2020, in Ahvaz, Baghayi Hospital) was an Iranian prominent Lawyer and contemporary writer, essayist, the first leading writer of water & Power laws and the first encyclopedic writer in power laws. He had written the first book on philosophy of the wetlands Law in three volumes. The third volume of this book was about the rules of the wetlands Law which examined and explored 31 legal rules in 31 chapters and for the first time, placed the juridical rules and doctrines which can be an interpreter of the rights of water and wetlands Law, at the disposal of the readers. Hamid Rashidi had been recording and studying the compilation of a legal dictionary for the past 25 years

== Biography ==
Hamid Rashidi was born on 5 December 1961 in the Abolhassan area in Abadan, a coastal and industrial city in Iran, and raised in the same city. He was the second son of Abdul Rahaman Rashidi and Saeideh Rashidi. After completing high school at Abadan Razi/or Rhazes or Rasis high school, he was employed by Khuzestan Province Water & Power Authority Board in 1983 and as a legal representative followed up the organization's lawsuits. He realized that the Iranian society is in need of a water and Power legal terminology. He therefore committed to studying in this field and succeeded in providing the first legal dictionary for the Power and water industry in 1999 with the assistance of the Khuzestan Water & Power Authority Board and the Dadgostar publications. This dictionary was announced as the book of the year in the first round of the "Book of the Year" award in Khuzestan in the Winter of 2001 after two rounds of judgments by the head office of the Khuzestan Islamic Guidance and Culture. In Autumn of 2002, this dictionary was reprinted due to popular demand. The writer then tried to place the "Fair distribution of water law in Iran’s law mirror" or "Law of Equal Water – distribution in Iran" book at the disposal of the public which is a two volume book of describing and interpreting water laws and is in fact a scientific guide to water laws and he also tried to provide new solutions. This book was published by Dadgostar publications in 2003 and the second edition was brought out in the Autumn of 2008 with more than 100 pages entitled Additions and Supplements. Hamid Rashidi while continuing his master's degree in private law, during five years he spent day and night to write his book "Philosophy of Marshland Laws" in three volumes which was published by Mizan publishers during the Winter of 2010 and was patronized by the Khuzestan Water & Electricity Board. This book includes a comparative study of domestic and international laws and the relation between wetlands and surface and underground waters and the environment. Hamid Rashidi is one of the first writers of philosophy of the wetlands Law and the environment who has written the above books on his own. One of the main passions of this Iranian writer is for water laws and solving the water problems of the country and the future international water crisis and protecting the environment and our species. Hamid Rashidi is one of the hardest working contemporary writers and is currently writing the largest legal dictionaries or encyclopedias. He has over 20,000 notes and has typed over 3,000 of them himself and is currently editing and revising them. He himself comments that "the legal terminology is the result of 25 years of studies, note taking from books and various sources in various legal courses. In case of this work being printed, it will be the largest encyclopedia of Iranian law.(Hamid Rashidi, philosophy of the wetlands Law, 1st Vol. autobiography Chapter pages 46–47, Mizan publishers, first edition 2010)

Hamid Rashidi has been lecturing since 1994 in some legal subjects and water rights as well as writing. He has been lecturing for two years in philosophy and general water laws in the manpower capacity building project in the water section at Power and Water University of Technology(PWUT) in the country(Islamic republic of Iran) with the assistance of the UNESCO-IHE under the title of "Training & Capacity Building for Water & Wastewater Sector in Iran Home", UNESCO-IHE Institute for Water Education Files for the National Water Board MSC students in Tehran and with coordination with his Dutch counterpart (short-term course). He has also been lecturing in the Power and Water University of Technology(PWUT) on invitation from the college and the main specialist company of Iran water resources in the first half of 2011 (Hamid Rashidi, philosophy of the wetlands Law. 1st Vol. autobiography Chapter, pages 49 onward, Mizan Publishers, 1st edition 2010)

He also lectured in philosophy of water laws, civil responsibilities of employees and the philosophy of irrigation network limits to the personnel of irrigation network use company of Gotvand in 2008, Lecturing civil and penal responsibility of employees to the employees of use company of dam and power station of Marun Dam irrigation network in 2009. Arranging seminar on legal effects of lack environmental evaluation of water resource projects in the regional irrigation and drainage committee of Khuzestan in 2007. Writing and lecturing general laws of water for managers and experts at legal departments of regional water companies of the country in the research and management training institution of the Ministry of Energy of Iran, (Persian: وزارت نیرو) in Karaj during 2007 and 2008. Compiling topic for lecturing water rights and submitting to the Iranian Water Resources Management Company and its ratification by the said company. Consultant lecturer at Ashraf Alsadat Kashani, student of MA in financial management: thesis on scrutiny of reasons and results of revocation and end of water development projects of the Khuzestan Water & Power Board and cooperation with research and management training institutions of the Ministry of Energy of Iran, (Persian: وزارت نیرو Vezârat-e Niru) in 2005–2006

== Death and funeral ==
Hamid Rashidi died on Saturday 25 April 2020 in Ahvaz, Baghayi Hospital, primarily due to nasopharynx cancer and then the liver cancer. He was hospitalized in ICU of the same hospital for 17 days fighting with progressive cancer and afterward the hospital pronounced his death at 6 pm on 25 April 25, 2020. He is interred in Behesht Abad Cemetery in Ahvaz, Iran.

== Written and published works ==
• Dictionary of legal terms for water & Power industry (in 863 pages), with the introduction of Dr. Goodarz Eftekhar Jahromi • Law of Equal Water – distribution in Iran. . • Encyclopedia of power Rights . • philosophy of the wetlands Law : three volumes with the introduction of Dr. Hussein Mehrparvar lecturer at Shahid Beheshti Law College • Source of Water rights • Introduction of other books in official portals • Other documents

=== Published articles ===
- A glance at rights of water & Power industry, printed in scientific journal of Khuzestan water & Power industry training center.
- The Legal shortfalls of River Engineering Law in Iran
- The Borders of lands, mentioned in scientific journal of Khuzestan water & Power industry training center 1998.
- Necessity of compiling great encyclopedia of Iran laws, mentioned in law and society magazine in 1998.
