= Mohsen Rastani =

Iranian photographer and photojournalist (1958–2026)

Mohsen Rastani (Persian: محسن راستانی; 27 December 1958 – 25 October 2026) was an Iranian photographer and photojournalist. He mainly created photographs of people on a black-and-white basis with a white background.

== Life and career ==
Rastani was born in Khorramshahr on 27 December 1958. He returned to the city in 1982 shortly after the Liberation of Khorramshahr in the Iran–Iraq War. Rastani returned from Tehran, where he was studying for the entrance exams to the Faculty of Fine Arts. At that point he started photography.

He earned in B.A. in photography at the Faculty of Fine Arts of the University of Tehran in 1987. He lectured at the same institute as well.

Rastani died on 25 October 2026, at the age of 67.

== Works ==
Rastani typically photographed people on a white background in black-and-white. He said it was difficult to exhibit his works in Iran due to people posing for his photos in outfits they wear at home. His work, amongst others, covered the Iran–Iraq War, the Lebanese Civil War in the late 1980s and the Bosnian War in the 1990s. They have amongst others been exhibited at the MAXXI in Rome, Italy.

Rastani was one of the four Iranian artists elected to represent the country at the International Art Exhibition of the 2011 Venice Biennale.
