= Ranguniha Mosque =

Mosque in Abadan, Khuzestan Province, Iran

Ranguniha Mosque (Rangooniha Mosque)
- مسجد رنگونی‌های آبادان
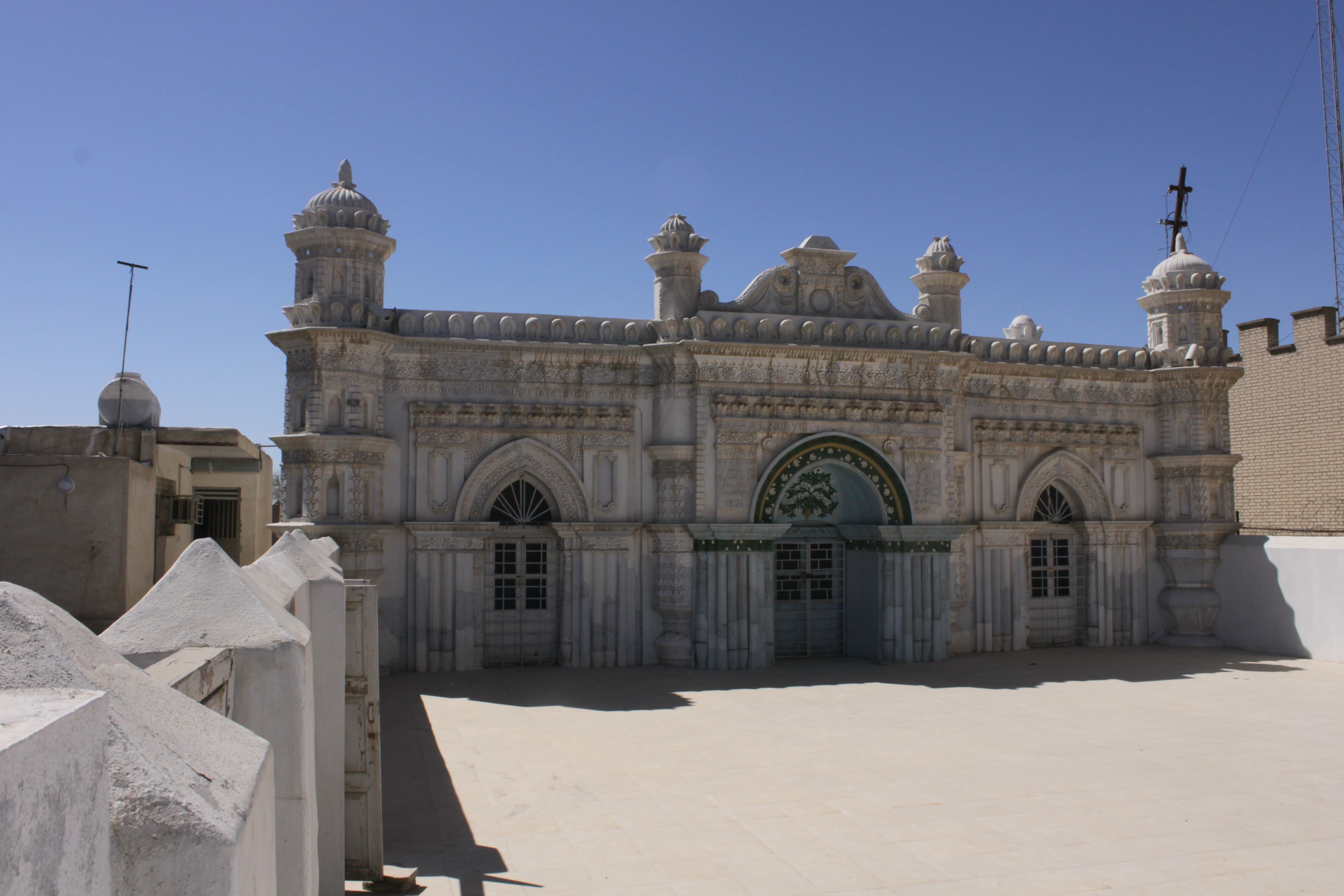
- Entrance to the former mosque, now museum, in 2012

- Location of the former mosque, now museum, in Iran

Religion
- Affiliation: Sunni Islam
- Ecclesiastical or organizational status: Mosque (1920–c. 2000s); History museum (since 2009)
- Status: Inactive (as a mosque); Preserved (as a museum)

Location
- Location: Abadan, Khuzestan Province
- Country: Iran
- Interactive map of Ranguniha Mosque (Rangooniha Mosque)
- Coordinates: 30°20′06″N 48°16′40″E

Architecture
- Type: Mosque architecture
- Style: Mughal; Qajar / Pahlavi
- Groundbreaking: 1912 CE
- Completed: 1920 CE (Qajar and Pahlavi eras)

Specifications
- Dome: Four (small)
- Minarets: Two; plus two turrets
- Inscriptions: “Bismillah al-Rahman al-Rahim”
- Materials: Concrete; bricks; mirrors; pipes; railway tracks

Iran National Heritage List
- Official name: Rangooniha Mosque
- Type: Built
- Designated: 29 March 1999
- Reference no.: 2289
- Conservation organization: Cultural Heritage, Handicrafts and Tourism Organization of Iran

The Ranguniha Mosque (Persian: مسجد رنگونی‌های آبادان, romanized: Masjed-e Ranguniha-ye Abadan; Arabic: مسجد رنكوني عبادان), also spelled as the Rangooniha Mosque (romanized:Masjed Rangooniha), (Note: Also variously Rangoonis Mosque and Masjed Rangooni-ha.) is a former Sunni mosque, now history museum, located on the banks of the Arvand River, in the city of Abadan in Abadan County, in the province of Khuzestan, Iran. The mosque was completed in 1920, during the Qajar and Pahlavi eras.

The mosque was added to the Iran National Heritage List on 29 March 1999, administered by the Cultural Heritage, Handicrafts and Tourism Organization of Iran.

== Architecture ==
Construction of the mosque began in 1912 and was completed in 1920, and the mosque was extensively restored in 2009. The mosque was built for Indian, Pakistani, Myanmar, and Bangladeshi workers who had come to Iran to work in oil refineries in Southern Iran. Most had previously worked at the then British Colonial Burmese oil refinery, located in Rangoon; (Note: now Yangon.) hence the name of the mosque.

The architects responsible for the mosque were from India and, as a result, when compared with other Iranian mosques, the architecture is more closely aligned with the Mughal style popular on the Indian subcontinent. The interior of the mosque is pained green, and the exterior is ornamented with cement and embossed decorations. The mihrab is one of the beautiful parts of the structure and has been decorated with arabesque and geometric floral patterns.

The mosque features four small domes and two minarets, with its exterior adorned in colorful cement. The prominent designs on the exterior enhance its visual appeal. While the mosque's decorations may initially appear to be plasterwork, they are actually crafted from cut cement. Additionally, mirrors—an essential element in Iranian architecture often used to embellish palaces and shrines—were incorporated into the mosque's decoration.

The mosque is composed of bricks, with lime mortar and clay, and encompasses a Shabistan, a main sahn, and two minarets. The roof combines oil pipes, railway tracks, and rebar. The tracks function as secondary beams, while the pipes serve as the main structural elements. The roof of the mosque is designed to be highly durable and resilient. Although it sustained damage from mortar fire during the Iran–Iraq War, resulting in a 70-centimetre (28 in) hole at the center and some visible cracks in the keystone of the arches, the overall structure remained largely intact and did not suffer severe damage.

=== History museum ===
After being restored and refurbished, the Rangooniha Mosque reopened in 2009 as the Historical and Handwritten Documents Museum. The museum contains old books, handwritten Qurans, and other manuscripts dating from the Qajar and Pahlavi eras and includes financial and business letters belonging to Iranian merchants in India and Britain, promissory notes, and bills of exchange.

The Rangooniha Mosque is open to the public during specific times.

== Gallery ==
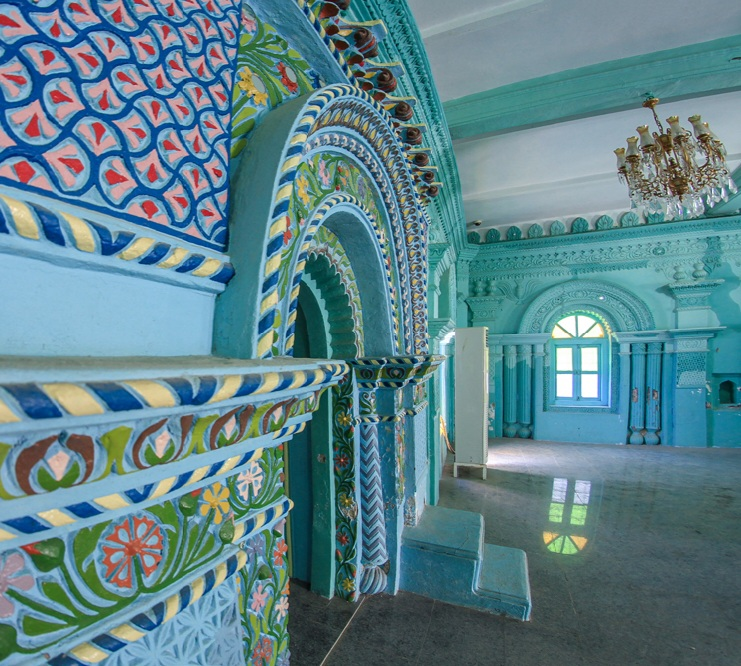
Detail of the prayer hall

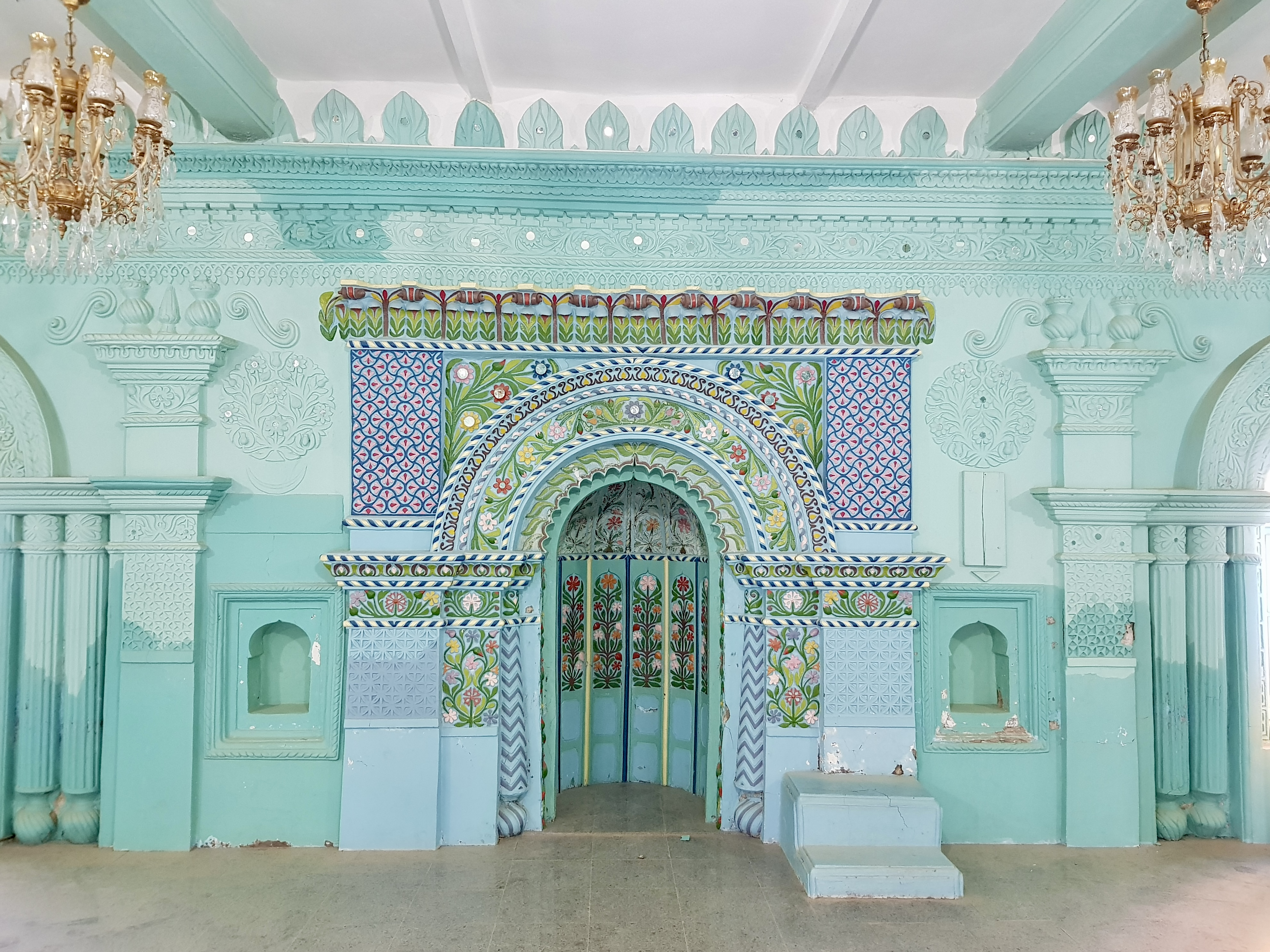
Mihrab detail

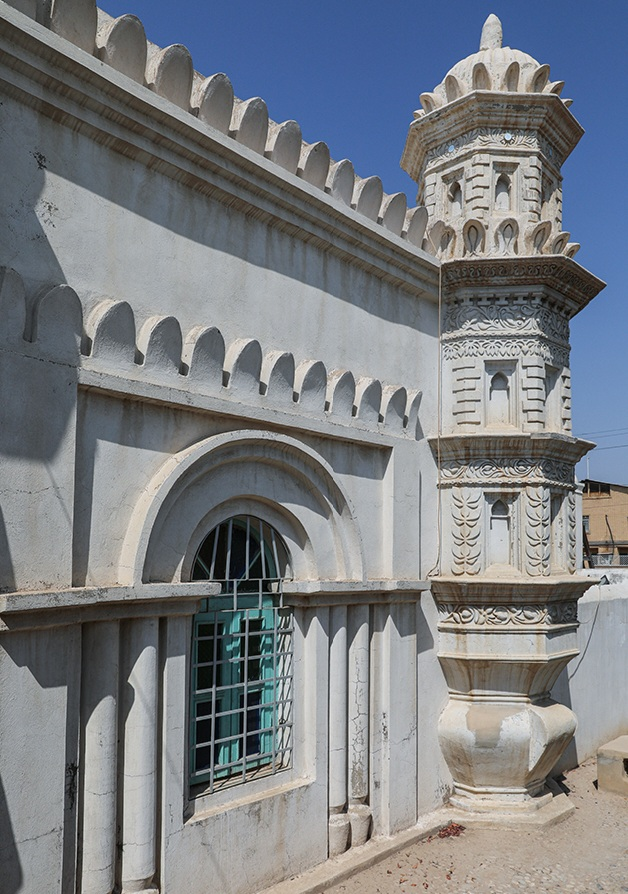
Exterior, with a squat minaret

== See also ==
- Sunni Islam in Iran
- List of mosques in Iran
