= Bechari House =

Historic house in Abadan, Iran

Bechari House (Persian: خانه بچاری) is a historic house in Abadan, Khuzestan province, Iran. Its construction dates back to the Qajar era and Sheikh Khazal's rule in Khuzestan. The building has two stories with special design, wood-works and arc architecture. It is registered as number 9968 on the Iran National Heritage List.
