= Saint Garapet Church, Abadan =

Church in Iran

Coordinates: 30°20′13″N 48°17′23″E

Saint Garapet church
- Սուրբ Կարապետ եկեղեցի
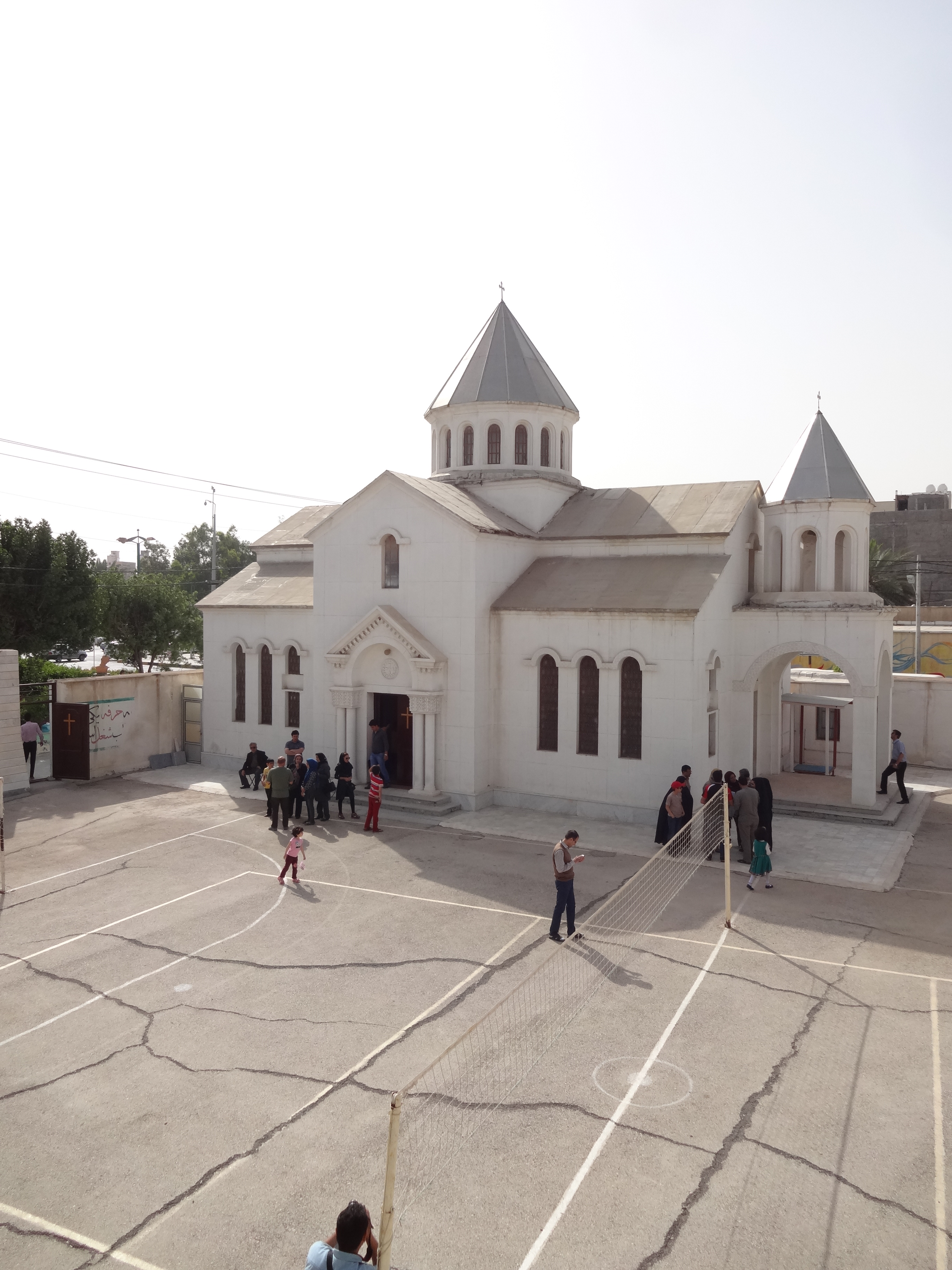
- Saint Garapet church
- Country: Iran
- Denomination: Armenian Apostolic

Saint Garapet Church (Persian: کلیسای گاراپت مقدس, Armenian: Սուրբ Կարապետ եկեղեցի) is a 20th century Armenian church in Abadan, Iran.

The church was constructed in 1940 and was the largest place of gathering for the Armenian community in Abadan at the time, however due to the low population of Armenians in the city, it is no longer operational. It was damaged in the Iran–Iraq war but was later repaired.

It was listed in the national heritage sites of Iran with the number 8352 on 29 April 2003.

== Gallery ==
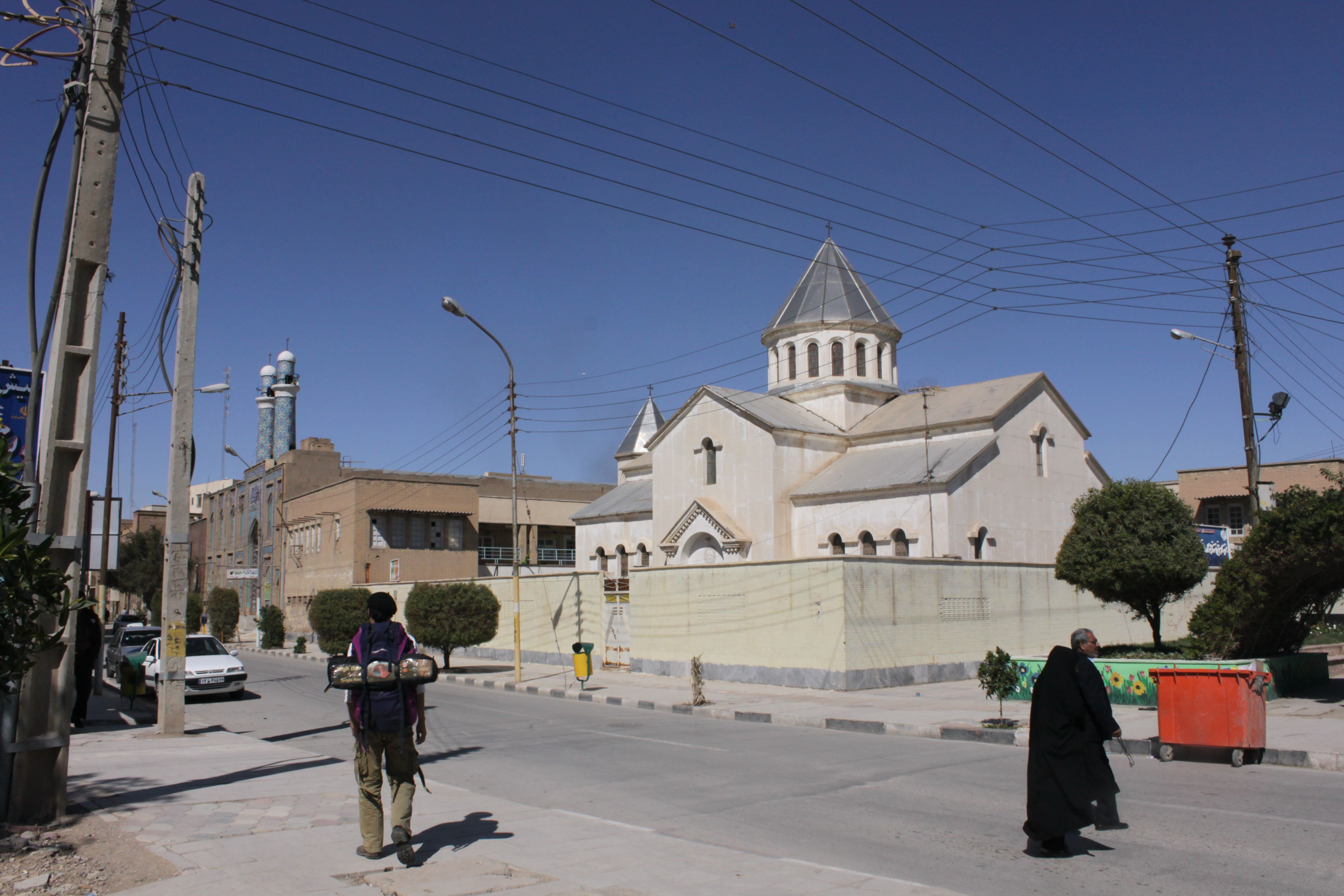

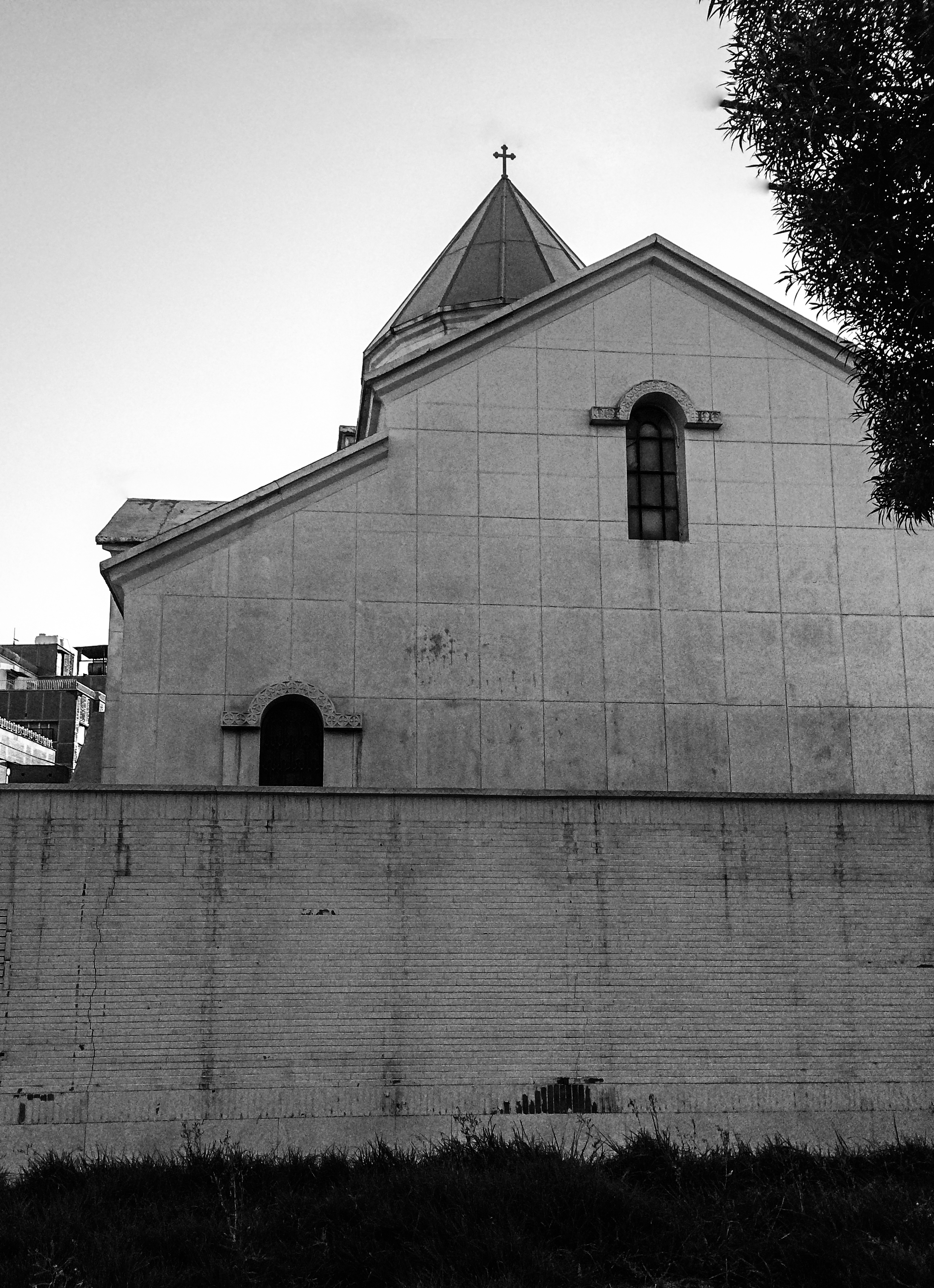

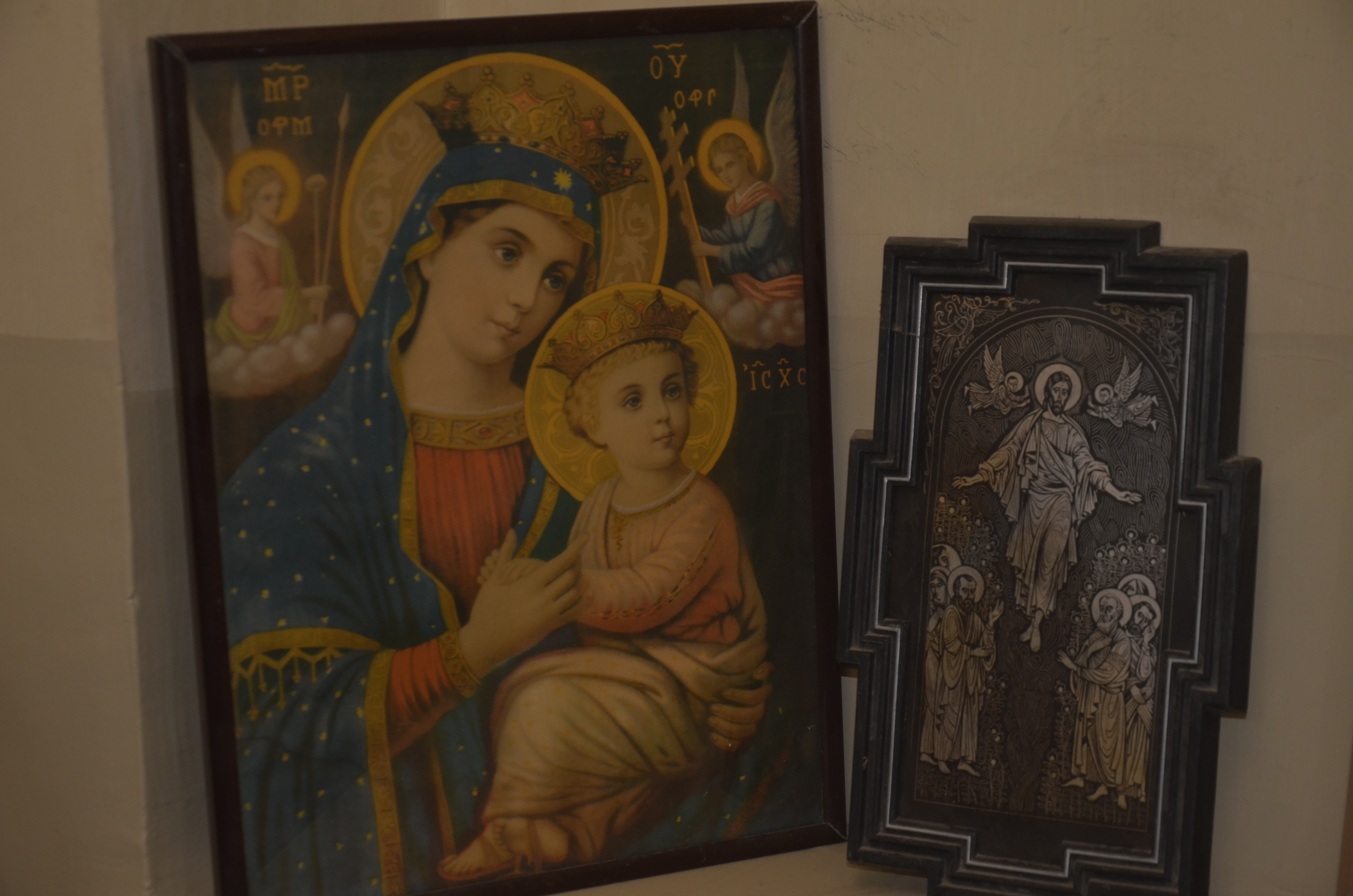

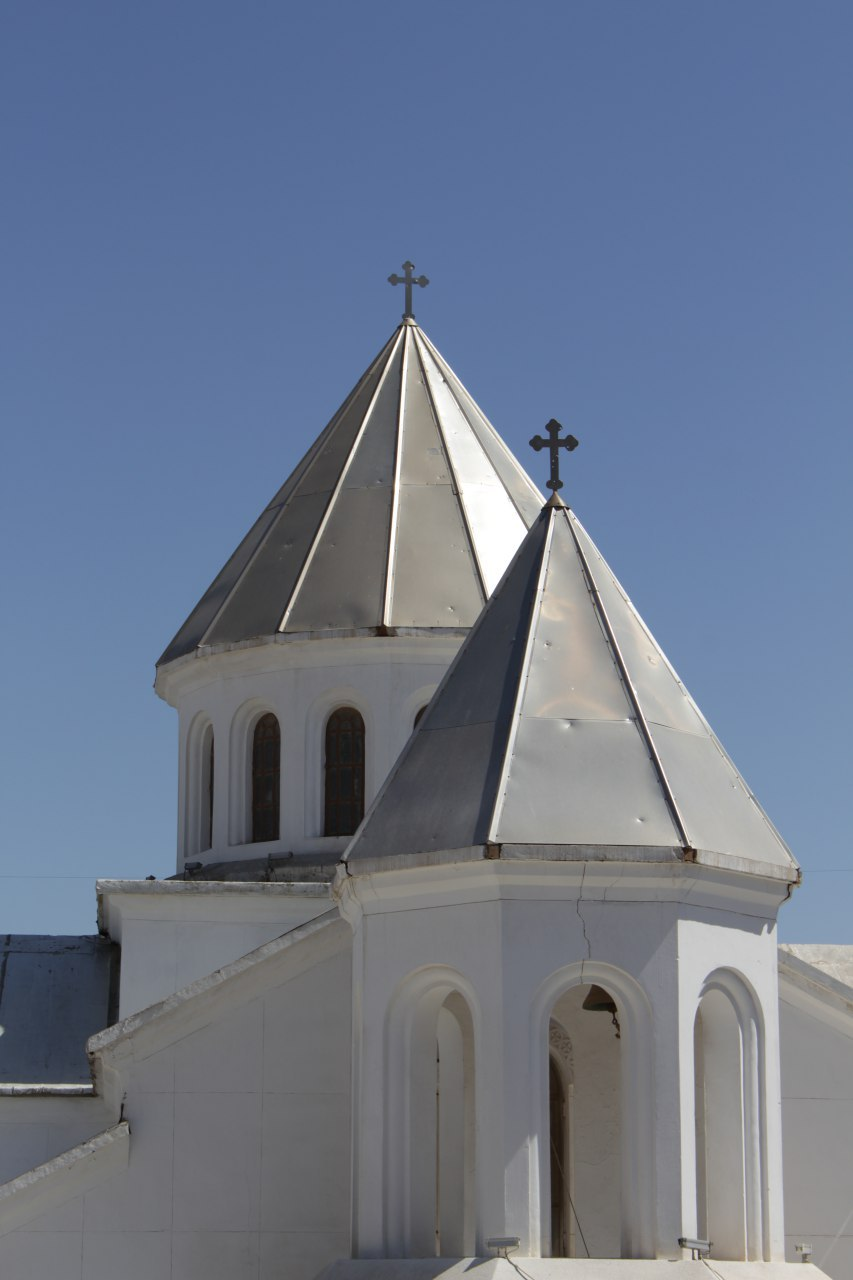
