= Abadan University of Medical Sciences =

University in Abadan, Iran

- دانشگاه علوم پزشکی آبادان
- Type: Public medical university
- Established: September 1941
- Founders: Ministry of Health and Medical Education
- Accreditation: IRI Medical Education Council, MOHME
- Academic staff: 300
- Students: 3,500
- Location: Abadan, Khuzestan Province, Iran; 30°21′46″N 48°13′31″E
- Campus: Urban
- Language: Persian, English
- Website: abadanums.ac.ir

Abadan University of Medical Sciences (AUMS) (Persian: دانشگاه علوم پزشکی آبادان, romanized: Daneshgah-e Olum Pezeshki-ye Abadan) is a public medical university located in Abadan, Khuzestan Province in central-west Iran near the Iraqi–Iran border. Established in September 1941 by the Ministry of Health and Medical Education as the country's first Nursing Faculty, it evolved through successive upgrades and on June 22, 2021 was formally transformed into an independent medical university.

== History ==
In September 1941, the Ministry of Health and Medical Education founded a Nursing Faculty in Abadan—the first nursing school in Iran.

In 1974, for the first time local students were admitted via the national university entrance exam to two associate degree programs in nursing and midwifery.

With the outbreak of the Iran–Iraq War in 1980, educational activities were halted and remaining students were transferred to the universities of Shiraz and Isfahan.

After the war’s end and rebuilding of facilities, the 50th meeting of the Council for the Expansion of Medical Sciences Universities approved the reopening of the center under the name Abadan Nursing College. From that point until 2007, the college offered continuous and non-continuous bachelor’s programs in nursing.

In 2011, the Abadan Nursing and Midwifery Unit was upgraded to Abadan College of Medical Sciences, and in 2012 it achieved full independence as Abadan University of Medical Sciences.

On 26 July 2013, preliminary approval was granted to establish a School of Medicine at AUMS.

On 24 July 2020, accreditation decrees for Ayatollah Taleghani, Shahid Beheshti, and Hazrat Valiasr educational hospitals affiliated with AUMS were confirmed for one year.

On 9 May 2021, the “Health and Research Journal” of Abadan University of Medical Sciences received publication permission.

On 23 May 2021, a Clinical Research Development Unit was approved at the Ayatollah Taleghani Educational and Medical Center.

On 22 June 2021, the institution was formally renamed Abadan University of Medical and Health Services.

On 4 August 2021, the establishment of an Environment Research Center was approved.

== Faculties ==
- Faculty of Medicine: This faculty was established in 2013 (1392 in the Iranian calendar) through the dedicated efforts of the capable officials of Abadan, beginning its activities at Taleghani Hospital in Abadan. At its inception, it admitted 35 medical students and began its educational activities, and each year, with the admission of new students, the number of students has continued to grow. The faculty operates independently, equipped with numerous classrooms, educational and research laboratories for physiology (along with an animal laboratory facility), microbiology, parasitology and mycology, histology, pathology, immunology, biochemistry, and a dissection hall, as well as a tissue culture research laboratory, cafeteria, study hall, IT unit, and more. It currently has over 600 students and 68 faculty members in both basic sciences (20 members) and clinical sciences (48 members). At present, the third, fourth, and fifth cohorts of medical interns are active in three teaching hospitals in Abadan and Khorramshahr.
- Faculty of Nursing and Midwifery: The Abadan Nursing Faculty was founded in 1969 as a nursing school to train healthcare staff for the region’s hospitals. In 1974, it began admitting students through the national entrance exam in nursing and midwifery. Activities were suspended during the Iran–Iraq War (1980–1988), with students transferred to other universities. The faculty reopened in 1992 and admitted its first Bachelor of Science in Nursing cohort in 1993. It later expanded to evening and non‑continuous bachelor’s programs. In 2011, it was promoted to the Abadan School of Medical Sciences, and in 2013 became part of the independent Abadan University of Medical Sciences.The faculty offers undergraduate and postgraduate nursing programs, equipped with skills labs, a clinical training center, library, and research facilities. It also oversees four regional health networks and aims to train competent, ethical nurses to meet local healthcare needs and contribute to national and international nursing development.
- Faculty of Allied Medicine: The faculty offers undergraduate programs in Medical laboratory Sciences, Operating Room Technology, Anesthesia, Emergency Medical Services, Environmental Health Engineering, Health Information Technology, and Medical Librarianship. Its programs combine theoretical instruction with extensive practical training in specialized laboratories and affiliated teaching hospitals. Students gain hands‑on experience in diagnostic, therapeutic, and preventive healthcare services, preparing them for roles in hospitals, clinics, research centers, and public health organizations.

== Teaching Hospitals ==
- Abadan Shahid Beheshti Hospital
- Abadan Taleghani Hospital (Alavi Specialized Medical Center)
- Khorramshahr Vali Asr Hospital
- Mahshahr Razi Hospital
- Shadegan Shahid Chamran Hospital

== Research Centers ==
- Community Health Research Center
- Infectious Diseases Research Center
- Clinical Sciences Research Center
- Environment Research Center

== Scientific journal ==
*Health and Research Journal of Abadan University of Medical Sciences
