= Hans-Bjørn Foxby =

Danish mathematician (1947–2014)

Hans-Bjørn Foxby (1947 – 2014) was a Danish mathematician, and a professor of mathematics at University of Copenhagen. Foxby classes are named after him.

Foxby's research was in commutative algebra. He died from Alzheimer's disease on 8 April 2014.
