= Khorramshahr =

City in Khuzestan province, Iran

Khorramshahr خُرَمشَهر
- City
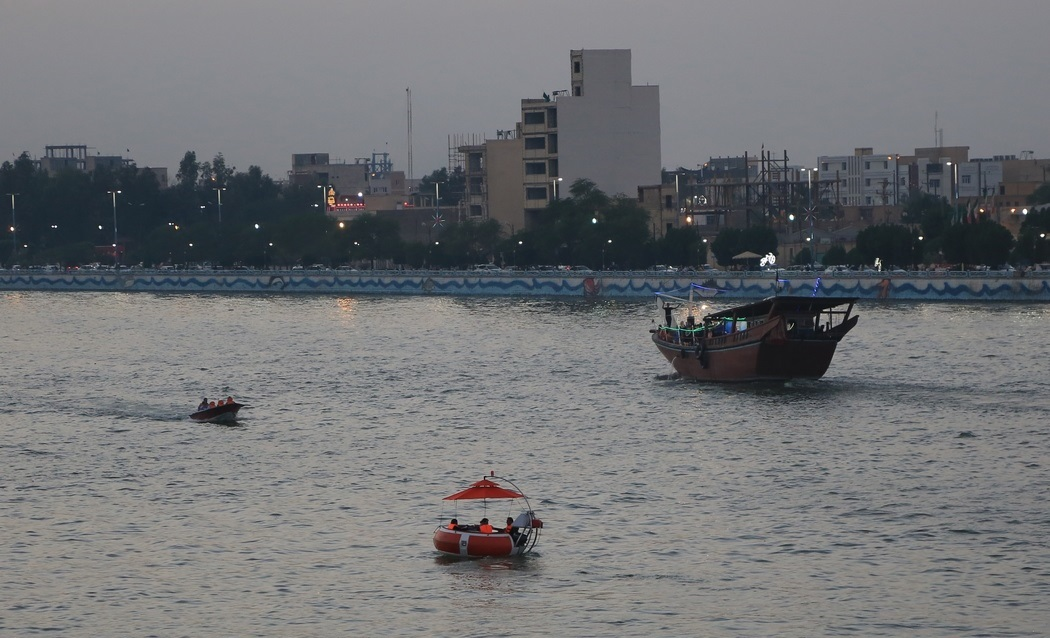
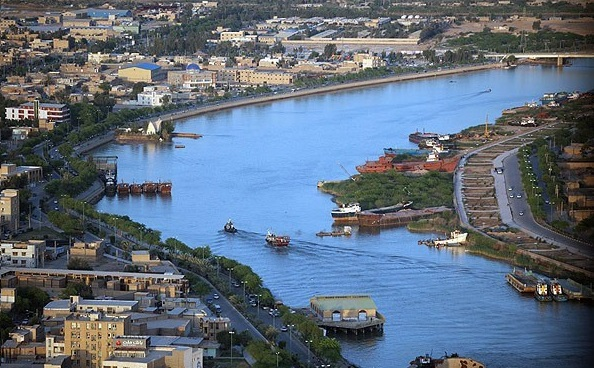

- Location within Iran
- Coordinates: 30°26′22″N 48°10′54″E
- Province: Khuzestan
- County: Khorramshahr
- District: Central

Government
  - Mayor: Kamyab Teymouri

Population (2016)
  - Total: 133,097
- Time zone: UTC+3:30 (IRST)

Khorramshahr (Persian: خرمشهر; [xoræmˈʃæhɾ]) (Note: Also known as Khurramshahr; (Arabic: المحمرة), romanized as Al-Muhammerah) is a city in the Central District of Khorramshahr County, Khuzestan province, Iran, serving as capital of both the county and the district.

Khorramshahr is an inland port city located approximately 10 kilometres (6.2 mi) north of Abadan. The city extends to the right bank of the Shatt Al Arab waterway near its confluence with the Haffar arm of the Karun river. The city was destroyed in the Iran–Iraq War, with the 1986 census recording a population of zero. Khorramshahr was rebuilt after the war, and more recent censuses show that the population has returned to the pre-war level.

== History ==
The area where the city exists today was originally under the waters of the Persian Gulf. It later became part of the vast marshlands and the tidal flats at the mouth of the Karun River. The small town known as Piyan, and later Bayan appeared in the area no sooner than the late Parthian time in the first century AD. Whether or not this was located at the same spot where Khurramshahr is today, is highly debatable.

During the Islamic centuries, the Daylamite Buwayhid king, Panah Khusraw Adud ad-Dawlah ordered the digging of a canal to join the Karun River (which at the time emptied independently into the Persian Gulf through the Bahmanshir channel) to the Shatt al-Arab (the joint estuary of the Tigris and Euphrates rivers, known in Iran as Arvand Rud). The extra water made the joint estuary more reliably navigable. The channel thus created was known as the Haffar, Arabic for "excavated," "dugout," which exactly described what the channel was. The Haffar soon became the main channel of the Karun, as it is in the present day.

It was the capital of the Sheikdom of Muhammara, and until 1847, at which time it became Persian territory (according to Article II of the Treaty of Erzurum), Khorramshahr was alternately claimed and occupied by Persia and Turkey. Its ruler at the time was an Arab sheikh.

=== Iran–Iraq War ===
Because of the Iran–Iraq War, the population of Khorramshahr dropped from 146,706 in the 1976 census to 0 in the 1986 census. During the first battle of Khorramshahr, the Iranian propaganda referred to the city as Khuninshahr (Persian: خونین شهر, lit. 'City of Blood'), because of the heavy casualties. The population reached 34,750 in the 1991 census and by the 2006 census it reached 123,866, and according to World Gazetteer its population as of 2012 is 138,398, making the population close to what it was before the war.

=== 2026 Iran war ===
Eyewitnesses reported that the city came under attack on the morning of April 6, 2026.

== Demographics ==
=== Mandaean community ===
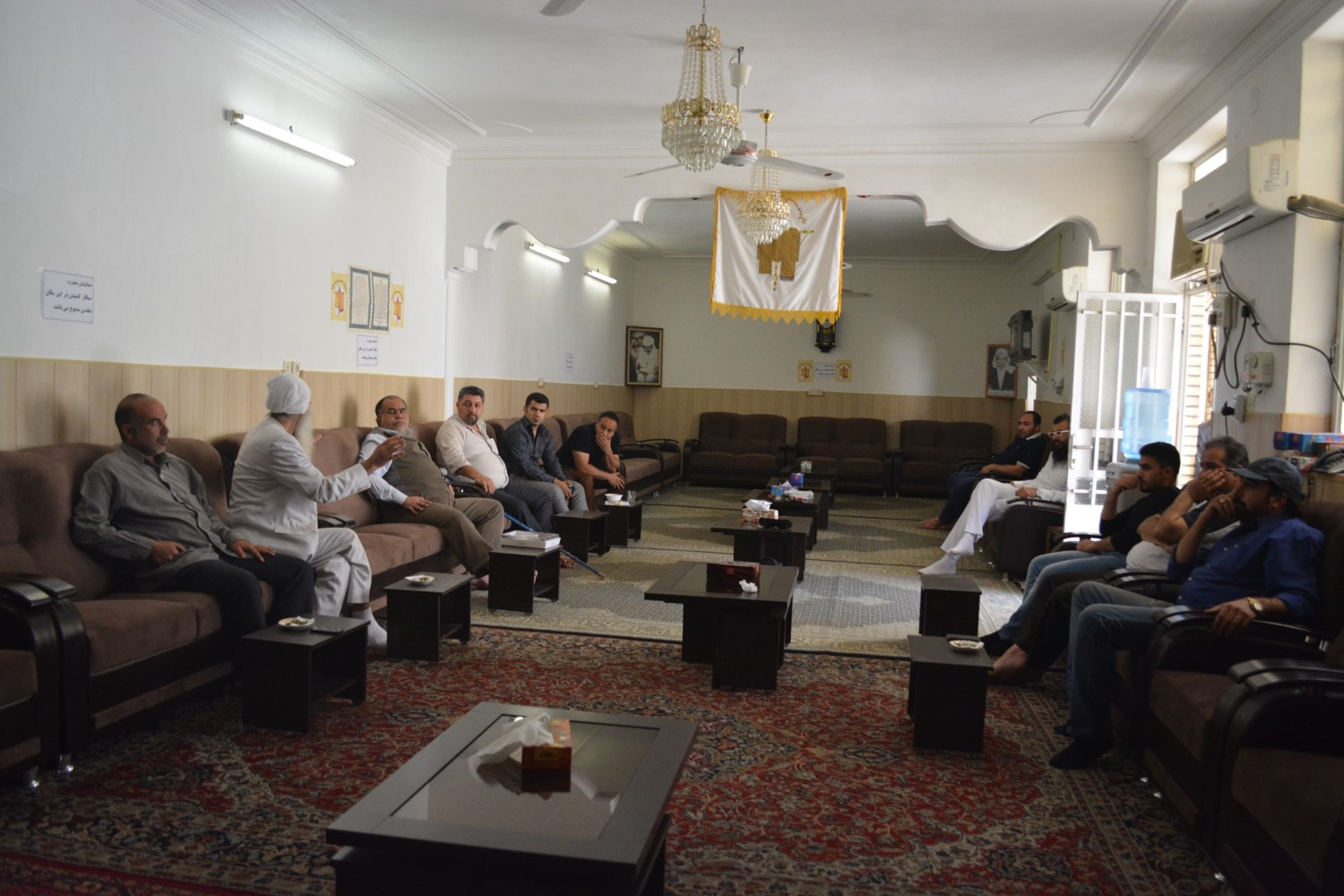
Mandaeans in Khorramshahr in 2015

Khorramshahr is home to a Mandaean community. It is one of the last remaining locations in the world where Neo-Mandaic is still spoken. There are only a few hundred speakers of the Khorramshahr dialect of Neo-Mandaic.

=== Population ===
At the time of the 2006 National Census, the city's population was 123,866 in 26,385 households. The following census in 2011 counted 129,418 people in 33,623 households. The 2016 census measured the population of the city as 133,097 people in 37,124 households.

Population census of Khorramshahr
| Year | Pop. | ±% p.a. |
|---|---|---|
| 1976 | 146,706 | — |
| 1986 | 0 | −100.00% |
| 1991 | 34,750 | — |
| 2006 | 123,866 | +8.84% |
| 2011 | 129,418 | +0.88% |
| 2016 | 133,097 | +0.56% |

=== Language ===
The linguistic composition of the city:

Khorramshahr linguistic composition
| Language | percent |
| Khuzestani Arabic | 65% |
| Persian | 35% |

== Notable people ==
- Majid Bishkar (b. 1956), Iranian football player who played in the 1978 FIFA World Cup
- Mohsen Chavoshi (b. 1979), Iranian musician, singer, record producer and songwriter
- Meguertitch Khan Davidkhanian (1902–1983), former governor
- Abdolreza Helali (b. 1981), Iranian Maddah
- Mohsen Rastani (b. 1958), Iranian photographer, photojournalist
- Siamak Yassemi (b. 1959), Iranian mathematician elected as a member of the World Academy of Sciences

== See also ==
Media related to Khorramshahr at Wikimedia Commons
