= Bahmanshir =

River in Iran

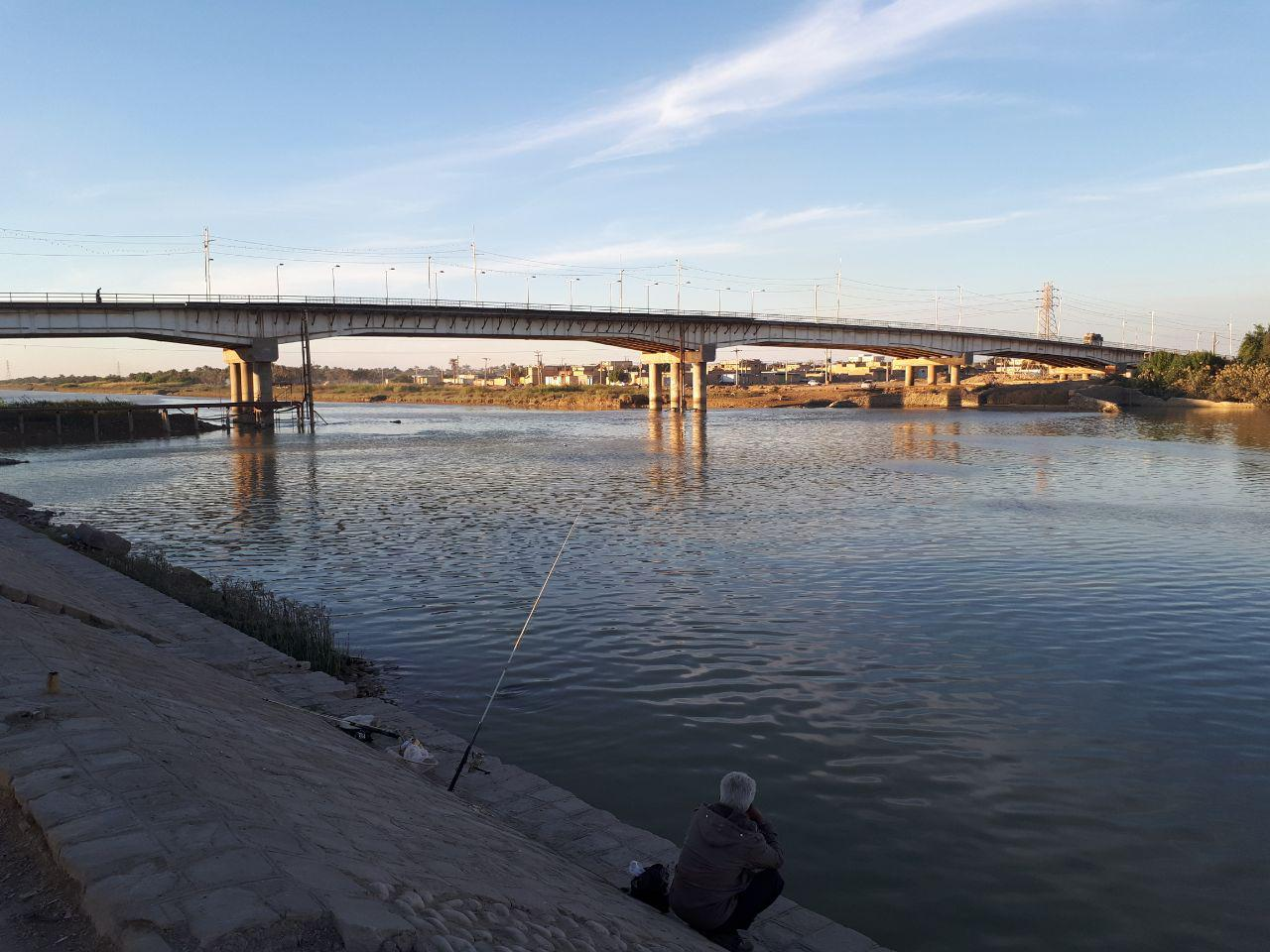
A bridge over the Bahmanshir River in the Istgah-e Haft neighborhood of Abadan, Iran

The Bahmanshir channel (Persian: بهمن‌شیر, IPA: [bæhmænˈʃiːɾ]) is a secondary estuary of the Karun River that parallels the Shatt al-Arab/Arvand Rud waterway on the far side of the Abadan Island, Iran, for 70 miles before emptying into the Persian Gulf.

The Bahamanshir served as the main estuary of the Karun River before the digging of the Haffar canal, by the Daylamite Buwayhid king Panah Khusraw Adud ad-Dawlah, that joined the Karun to the Arvand Rud / Shatt al-Arab waterway at the site of the present-day Khorramshahr. The Haffar in time became the main estuary of the Karun, relegating the Bahmanshir to a secondary estuary status.

The river's name was a contraction of Vahman-Ardashir, Middle Persian for the "Good thought of Ardashir," named for the Sasanian king, Ardashir I. The Bahamanshir may be a man-made canal, "thought up" by king Ardashir, as the Haffar later came to be. If so, then the Bahmanshir was excavated to deliver the waters of the mighty Karun directly to the Persian Gulf, creating a navigable estuary that could bring the seafaring vessels from the Persian Gulf all the way up to city of Ahwaz in the heartland of Khuzistan plain—120 miles away. Without the Bahmanshir, the waters of the Karun—like those of the Tigris and the Euphrates largely fed the vast marshlands of southern Mesopotamia that included the entire southern half of the Khuzistan as well—allowing for no navigable course to exist.

== Sources ==
- Morony, M. (1988). "BAHMAN-ARDAŠĪR". Encyclopaedia Iranica, Vol. III, Fasc. 5. p. 494.
- de Planhol, X. (1988). "BAHMANŠĪR". Encyclopaedia Iranica, Vol. III, Fasc. 5. pp. 500–501.
