= Khazʽal Ibn Jabir =

Sheikh of Mohammerah (1863–1936)

Khazʽal Bin Jabir
- Muaz us-Sultana, and Sardar-e-Aqdas (Most Sacred Officer of the Imperial Order of the Aqdas)
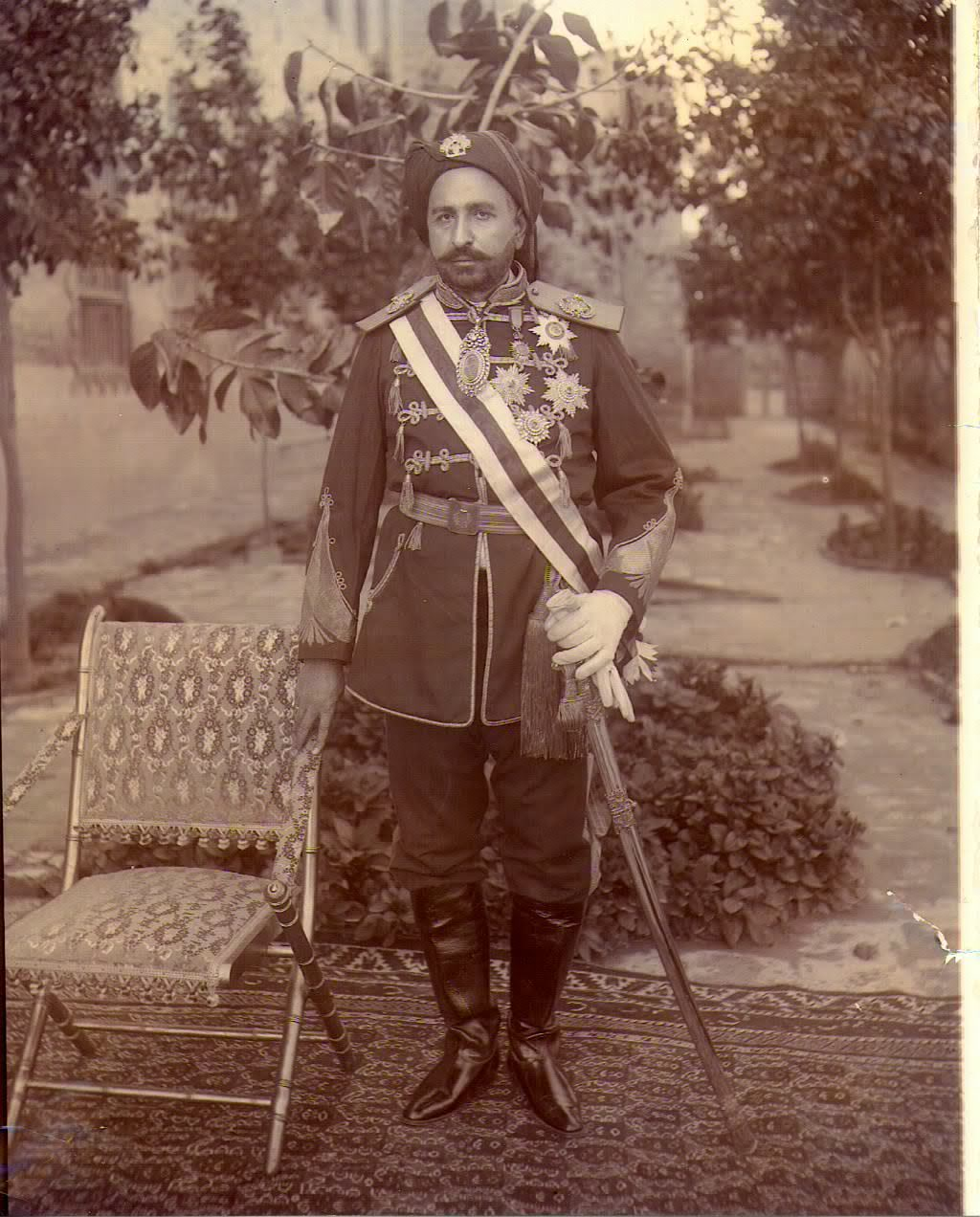
- Sheikh Khazʽal in military uniform

Sheikh of Mohammara
- Reign: June 1897 – April 1925
- Predecessor: Miz'al ibn Jabir
- Successor: Sheikhdom dissolved. Reza Shah Pahlavi as Shah of Iran
- Born: 1861; Kut al-Zayn, Abu al-Khasib District, Basra Vilayet, Ottoman Empire
- Died: 27 May 1936 (aged 74–75); Tehran, Iran
- Burial: Najaf, Iraq
- Spouse: See: Shahzadi Hamdam Khanum Jamil Sultana Batul Khanum, Fakhr-i-Sultana Malika Bint Nasser Shuaya Bint Unaizal Shaikha Sa’ada bint Jarrah Khatum bint Mard Shaikha Nazifa bint Abdullah Badgum Mashqa bint Yusuf Gariya bint Ali Muzakhaya Harina bint Abbas Fatima Nashmiya Amina (Widow of Mubarak Al-Sabah)
- Issue: See: Sheikh Hachim Sheikh Kasib Sheikh Abdul'Hamid Sheikh Abdul'Aziz Sheikh Abdul'Majeed Sheikh Abdul'Kareem Sheikh Abdullah Bin Khaz'al Sheikh Mohammad Saeed Sheikh Mansur Sheikh Mustafa Sheikh Abdul'Jalil Sheikh Saleh Sheikh Nizam ud-din Sheikh Abdul'Amir Sheikha Khayriyah Sheikha Zina Sheikha Asiya Sheikha Nasra Sheikha Sara Sheikha Badriya Sheikha Bilqis Sheikha Najma Sheikha Mansura Sheikha Zahra Sheikha Masuda Sheikha Zuleikha Sheikha Haya Sheikha Rafiya Sheikha Nur Al-Huda
Names
- Khaz'al bin Jabir bin Mirdaw bin Ali bin Kasib bin Ubood bin Asaaf bin Rahma bin Khaz'al
- House: Al Mirdaw
- Father: Jabir Ibn Merdaw
- Mother: Noura Bint Talal
- Religion: Islam
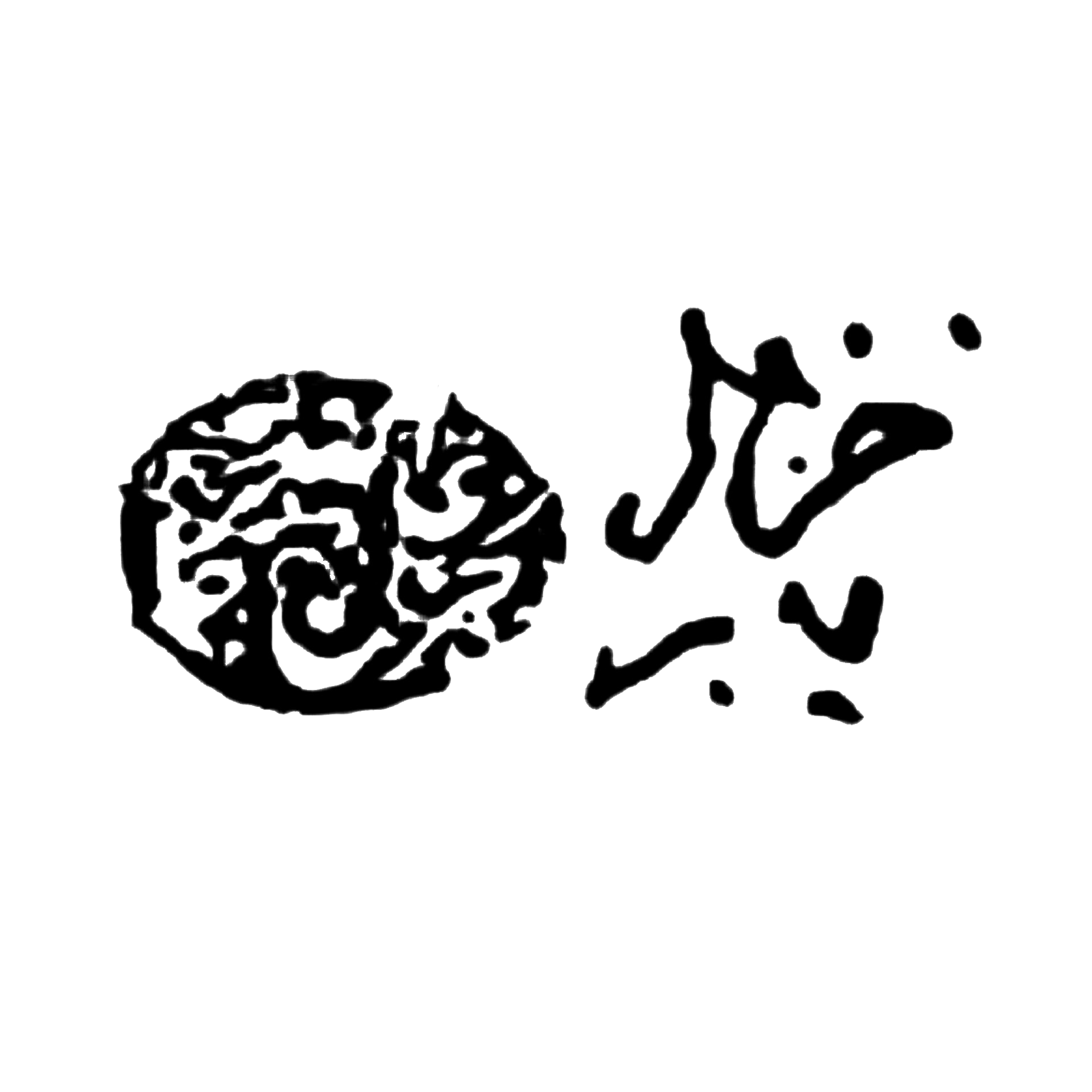
- Signature

Styles of Khaz'al
- Reference style: His Highness
- Spoken style: Your Highness
- Alternative style: Moulay

Khazʽal bin Jabir bin Merdaw al-Kaʽbi GCIE KCSI (Arabic: خزعل بن جابر بن مرداو الكعبي، Persian: شیخ خزعل; 1861 – 27 May 1936), was the Ruler of Arabistan, the Sheikh of Mohammerah, known as Sultan Khaz'al and Sultan of Mohammerah, from the Kasebite clan of the Banu Ka'b, of which he was the Sheikh of Sheikhs, the Overlord of the Mehaisan tribal confederation and the Ruler of the Shatt al-Arab. He was described as the most powerful Arabian ruler and maintained close relations with both Arab and European rulers. Foreign ships would fire salutes in his honor whenever they passed along the Shatt al-Arab near his palace and Pope Benedict XV honored him with the Order of St. Gregory the Great for his assistance in building a church and safe haven in Mohammerah for Christian refugees.

== Historical background ==
Khaz'al was born in 1861 in the village of Kut al-Zayn, in the Abu al-Khasib district of Basra, then under Ottoman rule. He was the fifth of his siblings. From an early age, his father devoted special attention to his upbringing, ensuring he received a well-rounded education, with particular emphasis on religion, languages, and horsemanship.

He was known for his sharp intellect, noble character, and generosity, and distinguished himself as a scholar and a revolutionary poet. Khaz'al married several women from noble families, including the daughters of princes and tribal leaders. In total, he had twenty wives and twenty-seven children, both sons and daughters. On 2 June 1897, Khaz'al inherited the Emirate of Mohammerah.

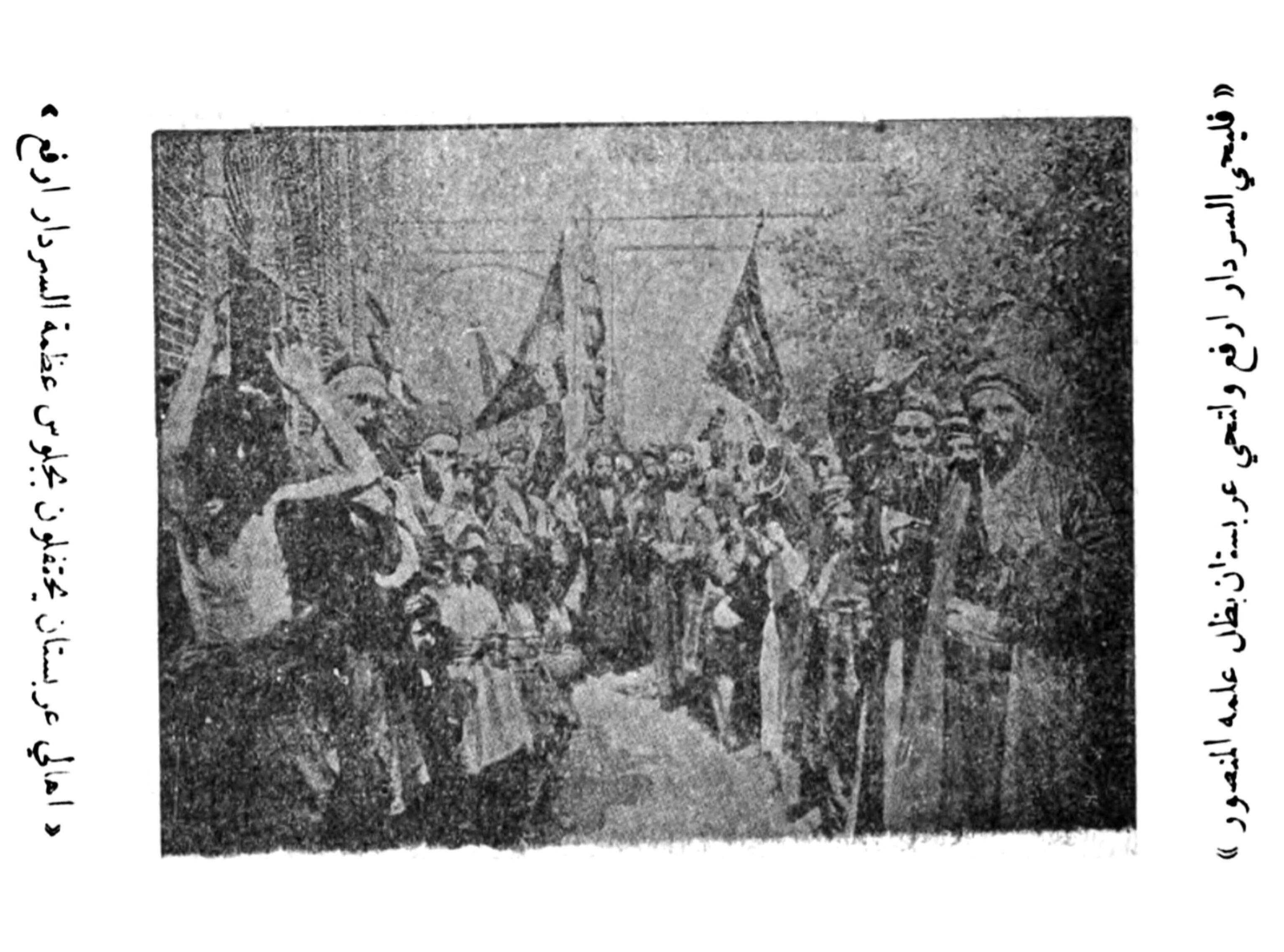
The people of Arabistan celebrating the ascension of Sheikh Khaz'al to the throne of the Emirate on June 2, 1897.

Although never a part of the British Empire, the Persian Gulf had been effectively incorporated into the British imperial system since the early 19th century. The conclusion of treaties and agreements with the region's various tribal rulers was one of the central means by which Britain enforced its hegemonic presence, and Khaz’al was no exception to this trend.

Khaz'al’s role in political life became prominent during the final years of his father’s rule, when he was entrusted with certain responsibilities and appointed commander of the army. When his older brother Sheikh Miz'al ibn Jabir assumed the emirate after their father’s death, Khaz'al continued to wield significant influence, and his brother relied heavily on him to suppress rebels among the sheikhs who refused to pledge allegiance to the new ruler.

However, subsequent political developments in Ahwaz — including the growing influence of the British on one side and Persia's occupation of the cities of Tustar and Dezful on the other — prompted Khaz'al to take action to assume authority and resist foreign encroachment. His efforts were praised by the British, as they prevented Persia from occupying those two cities. Eventually, Miz'al was assassinated after ruling for sixteen years, and Khaz'al succeeded him as ruler.

== Rise to power ==
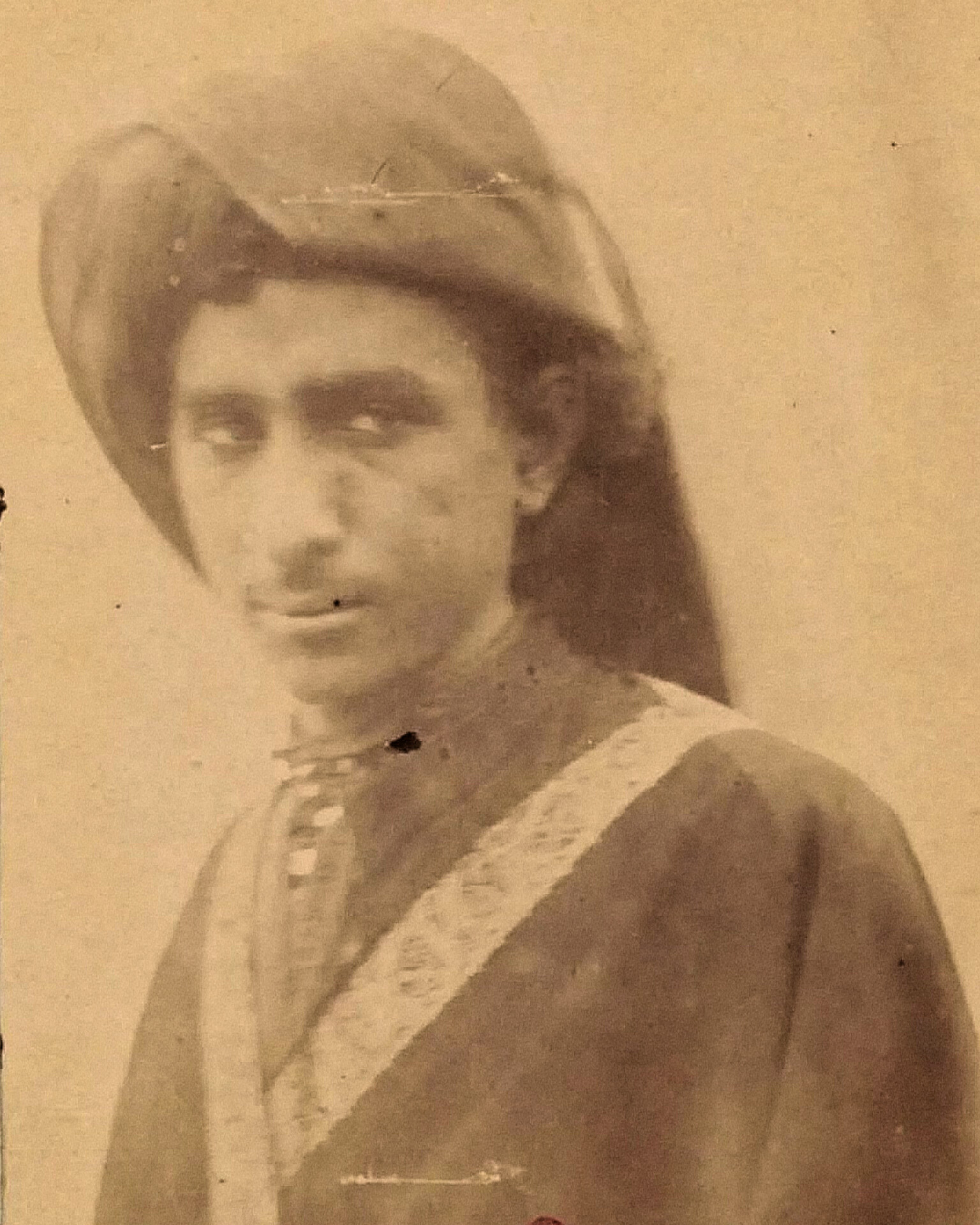
Young Shaikh Khaz'al, appearing sorrowful following the demise of his father, Shaikh Jaber in 1881, photograph by Madam Jane Dieulafoy

Upon Khaz'al's accession as the new emir, the capital saw extensive celebrations, with tribal leaders arriving to pledge allegiance, and delegations from Iraq also coming to offer their congratulations.

Upon assuming power, Khaz'al ushered in a new era for the emirate. He focused on strengthening internal governance, and his determination, strong personality, and firm control over state affairs had a profound impact on improving the emirate’s condition. After expelling Persian forces from the cities of Tustar and Dezful following intense battles, he appointed Arab governors over the two cities.

To consolidate his authority, Khaz'al unified all local sheikhs under his leadership, extending his influence from the Shatt al-Arab to Dezful, and even into surrounding Persian territories. Once his borders were secured and his authority established, he turned his attention toward further strengthening and developing the emirate.

== The Anglo-Persian Oil Company ==
The oil industry owed its early success to Sheikh Khaz'al. Once oil was discovered in Masjed Soleyman in 1908, by the Anglo-Persian Oil Company (APOC), later BP, Khaz'al's ties to Britain strengthened. In 1909, the British government asked Percy Cox, British resident to Bushehr, to negotiate an agreement with Khaz'al for APOC to obtain a site on Abadan Island for a refinery, depot, storage tanks, and other operations. The refinery was built and began operating in 1912. Khaz'al was knighted in 1910 and supported Britain in World War I.

Following the discovery of oil in Arabistan-controlled territory, the British moved quickly to establish control over the vast oil resources in the province, which culminated in the foundation of the Anglo-Persian Oil Company in 1909. The British established a treaty with Khaz'al, whereby in exchange for their guaranteed support and protection against any external attack, he would also guarantee to maintain internal security and not interfere with the process of oil extraction. As part of the treaty they were given a monopoly of drilling in the province in return for an annual payment to Khaz'al, though the profits of the company vastly exceeded the annual payments.

== Sheikh Khaz'al's Relations with the Ottoman Empire ==
The Emirate of Mohammerah, under the leadership of the Banu Ka'b tribe, had a long-standing history of autonomy and shifting allegiances between the Ottoman and Persian empires. Sheikh Khazʽal’s predecessors, including his father, Shaikh Jabir Ibn Merdaw, skillfully navigated these complex relationships to preserve the emirate’s autonomy.

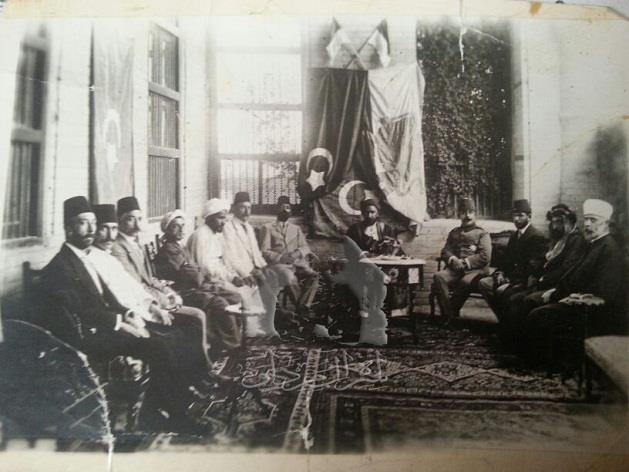
A delegation of Ottoman officials during a visit hosted by Sheikh Khazʽal in Muhammarah, with the Ottoman flag and the local flag of emirate displayed in the background.

Relations with the Ottoman Empire During Sheikh Khazʽal’s rule

the Ottoman Empire was in a period of decline, facing internal challenges and external pressures. The waning influence of the Ottomans in the Arabian Peninsula and the Persian Gulf provided Sheikh Khazʽal with opportunities to assert greater autonomy. While he maintained formal recognition of Ottoman suzerainty, Sheikh Khazʽal exercised considerable independence in the governance of the Emirate.

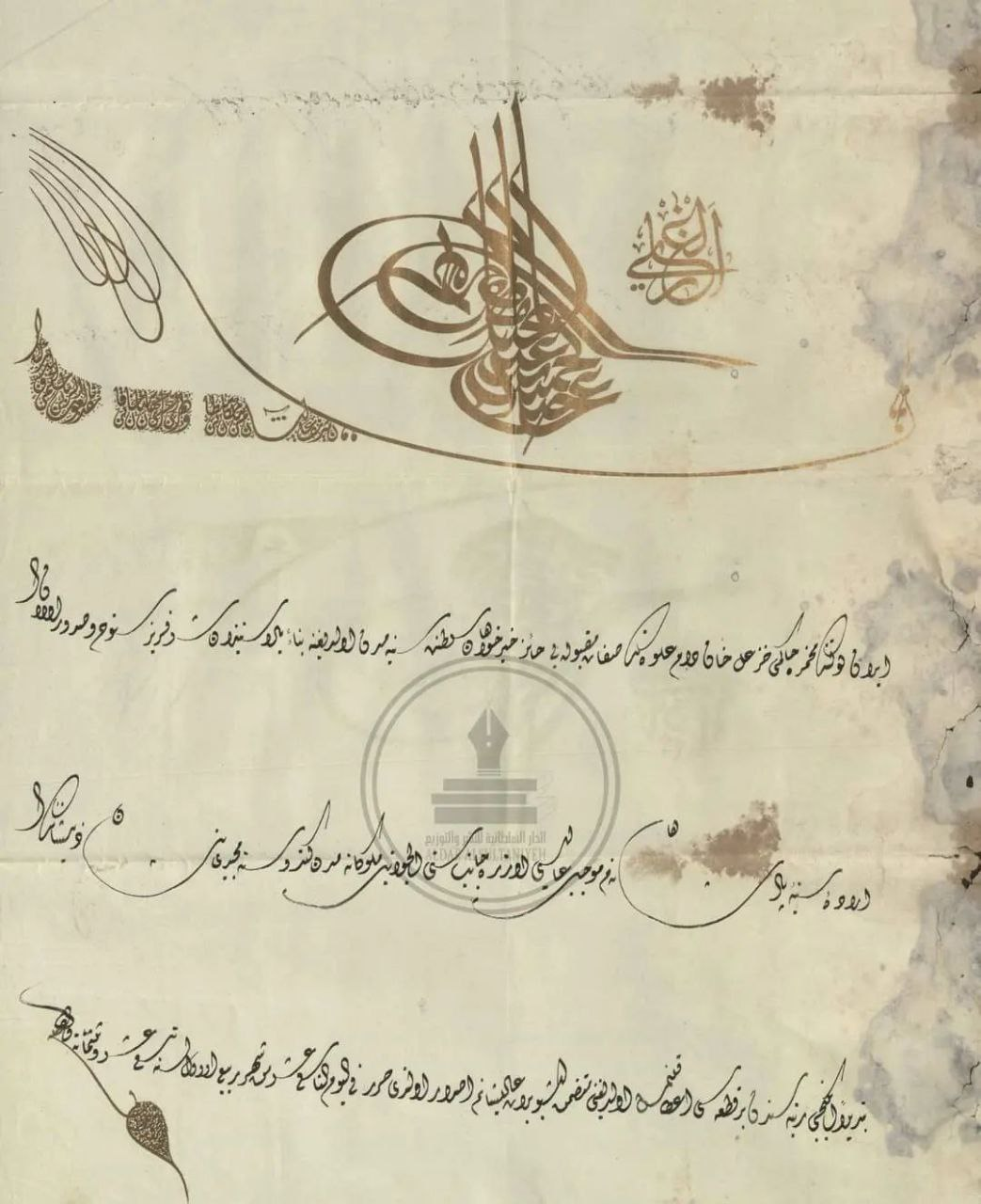
Sultan Abdul Hamid II Imperial firman (order) awarding Shaikh Khaz'al emir of Arabistan and Mohammerah the Nishan-i-Medjidie (Order of the Medjidie) of 1st class

However, Sheikh Khazʽal's relationship with the Ottoman Empire was not purely oppositional. He also played a significant role in assisting the Ottomans when it aligned with his interests. One of the most notable instances of his support was during the Battle of Tripoli, Sheikh Khazʽal extended his support to ottomans. Furthermore, he contributed financially to the Ottoman navy through donations to the Donanma Cemiyeti (Ottoman Navy Society) demonstrating his loyalty to the empire at a critical moment. This assistance earned him the recognition of Sultan Abdul Hamid II, who, in appreciation of his contributions, awarded him the 1st Class Majidi Order, one of the highest honors of the Ottoman Empire.

Arab Solidarity Against Ottoman Influence

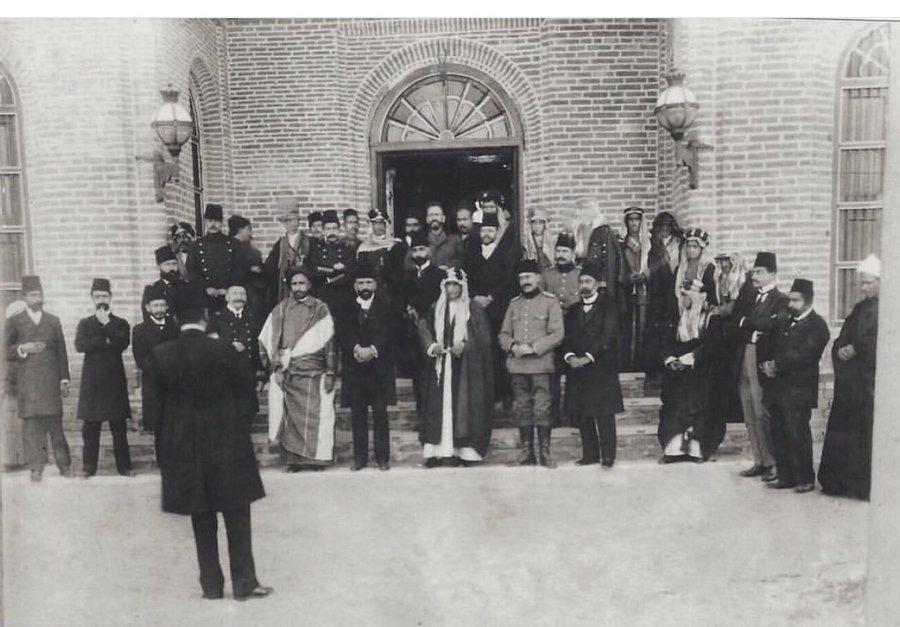
The conference of "Al-Failiyah" in The palace of Shaikh Khaz'al in Mohammerah in 1909. Notable Individuals in the photograph; Shaikh Khaz'al, Shaikh Mubarak Al-Sabah, Saadoun Pasha; Youssef Al-Naqeeb and Abdul Wahhab Pasha Al-Qurtas

Beyond his local affairs, Sheikh Khazʽal also played a significant role in fostering Arab unity against Ottoman dominance. He formed alliances with key Arab leaders in Arabia, Kuwait, and Iraq to resist Ottoman control over the Arab world. Understanding the growing nationalist sentiment among Arabs, Sheikh Khazʽal supported initiatives to strengthen Arab identity and autonomy.

In 1909, Sheikh Khazʽal convened a conference at his residence in Al-Fayliah Palace in Mohammerah, to advocate for the rights of Arabs under the Ottoman Empire. This notable assembly was attended by prominent figures such as Shaikh Mubarak Al-Sabah, the Emir of Kuwait; Saadoun Pasha; Youssef Al-Naqeeb; and Abdul Wahhab Pasha Al-Qurtas, the Ottoman Governor of Basra. The Ottoman Empire expressed considerable interest in the proceedings, which ultimately led to the appointment of Suleiman Pasha Al-Nazif as Governor of Basra in November 1909.

British Influence

The British Empire had substantial interests in the Persian Gulf, particularly regarding oil exploration and trade routes. Sheikh Khazʽal's strategic position made him a valuable ally for the British. He engaged in negotiations with British officials, seeking their support for his autonomy while leveraging British interests to strengthen his position against both Ottoman and Persian pressures.

Decline of Ottoman Influence

By the early 20th century, the Ottoman Empire’s control over its Arabian territories had significantly weakened. Sheikh Khazʽal capitalized on this decline by distancing his emirate from Ottoman influence and aligning more closely with British and Arab nationalist movements. This shift contributed to the eventual dissolution of the Emirate of Mohammerah following Sheikh Khazʽal’s arrest and exile by the Persian government in 1925.

== Sheikh Khaz'al turns down the throne of Kuwait ==
When Percy Cox was informed of this event, he sent a letter to Khaz'al offering the Kuwaiti throne to either him or one of his heirs, knowing that Khaz'al would be a wiser ruler. Khaz'al, who considered the Al Sabah as his own family, replied "Do you expect me to allow the stepping down of Al Mubarak from the throne of Kuwait? Do you think I can accept this?" He then asked:

...even so, do you think that you have come to me with something new? Al Mubarak's position as ruler of Kuwait means that I am the true ruler of Kuwait. So there is no difference between myself and them, for they are like the dearest of my children and you are aware of this. Had someone else come to me with this offer, I would have complained about them to you. So how do you come to me with this offer when you are well aware that myself and Al Mubarak are one soul and one house, what affects them affects me, whether good or evil.

== Conflict with Reza Khan and downfall ==
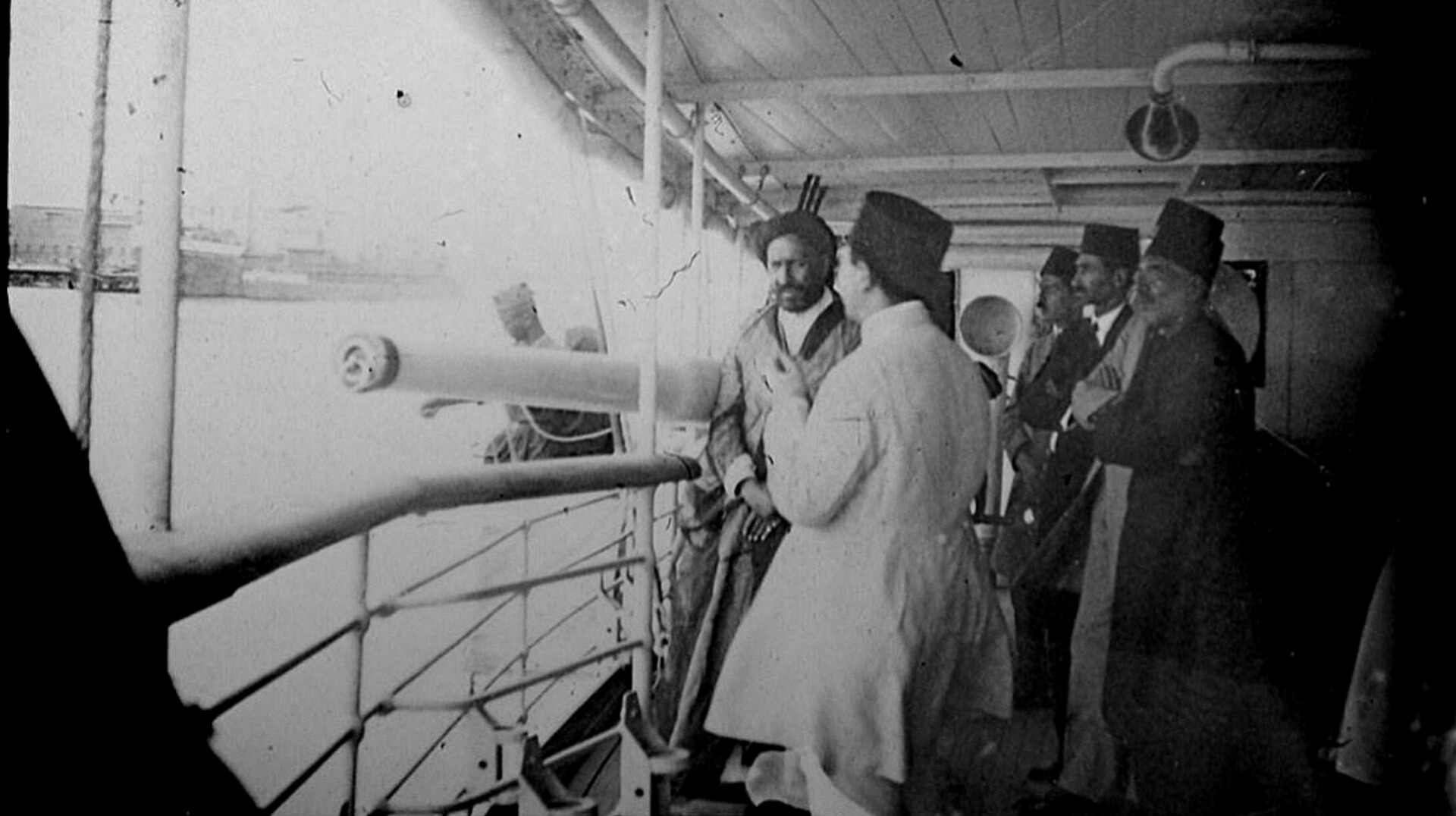
A rare photograph of Ahmad Shah Qajar visiting Shaikh Khaz'al the Emir of Arabistan, on Khazal's yacht, before leaving Persia for Europe in 1923

In November 1923, when Khaz’al Khan had seen Ahmad Shah Qajar off, as he was crossing the border for Europe, the Emperor had told him about his fears of Reza Khan's ambitions in the same way as he had spoken openly to Percy Loraine. Then came the Shah's telegram of April 1924 about his loss of confidence in Reza Khan. In the following summer, Khaz’al brought together some regional magnates and tribal heads – the Vali of Poshtkuh, heads of the Khamseh federation of tribes, and many of the local Arab tribal leaders – in a coalition to resist Reza. They described themselves as the Committee of the Rising for Happiness, and sent telegrams and statements to Tehran. Their statements demanded constitutional government and the return of the Shah, who they said had been forced to remain in Europe. They also attacked military violations of the people's rights in the provinces, and ‘the massacres of Loristan’; demanded Reza Khan's dismissal; and described the Prince Regent, Ali Reza Khan Azod al-Molk, as the legitimate fount of authority. It was all in the name of the law, justice and the constitution, and ‘in the illustrious name of His Imperial Majesty Soltan Ahmad Shah, the constitutional monarch’. The committee sought to defend and protect constitutionalism, and stop the traitors and criminals freely dispensing with it and re-establishing the apparatus of arbitrary rule and injustice once again ... and stop Reza Khan from trampling the principles of democratic government under foot by arbitrary government."

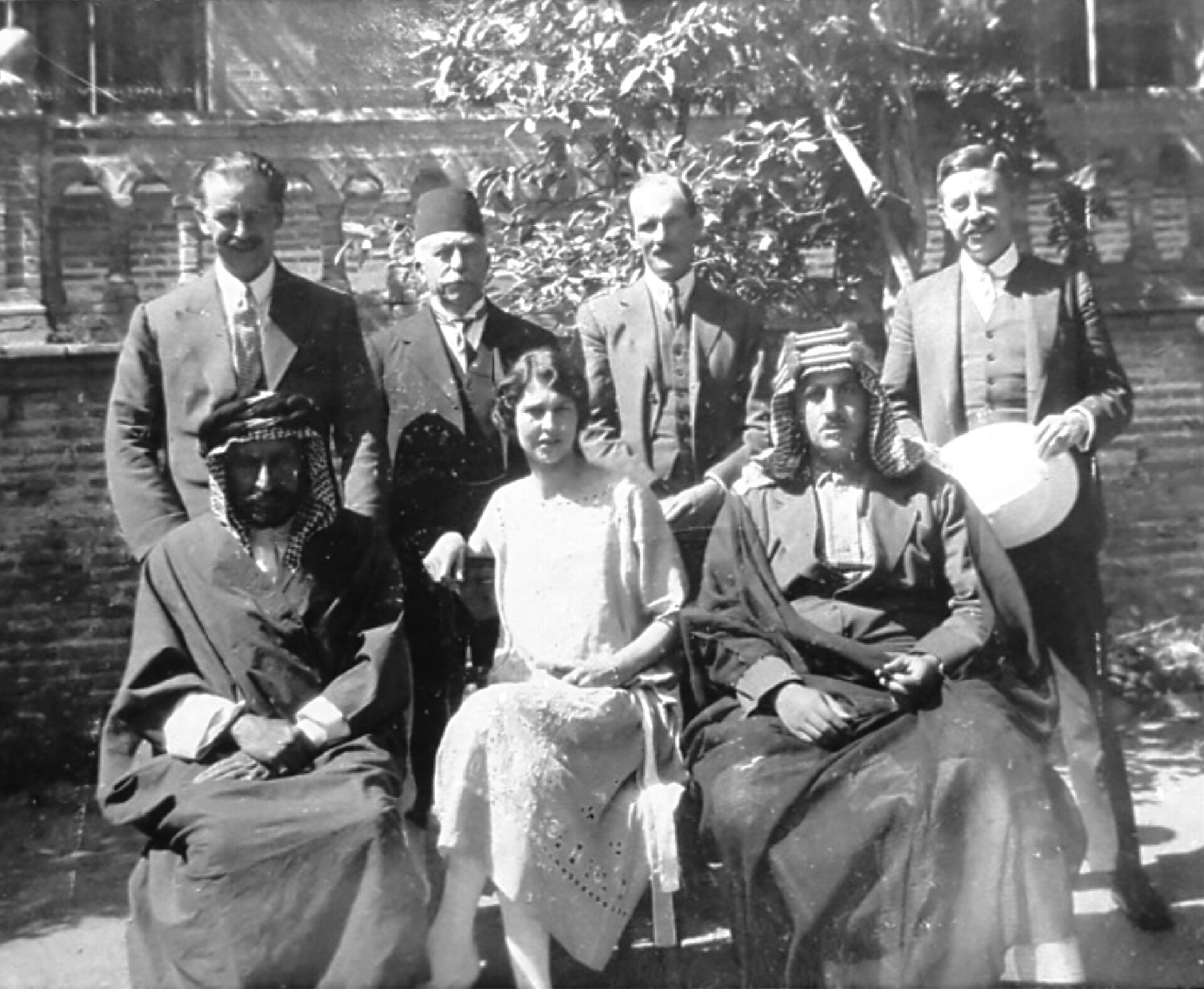
Shaikh Khaz'al and his crown prince Shaikh Abdulhamid bin Khaz'al, the British Ambassador sir Percy Loraine, with his wife, before the false reconciliation with Reza Khan in the city of Ahwaz on December 6, 1924.

The Prince Regent wrote an encouraging letter to Khaz’al, all in the name of the Shah and for protection of the constitution, and said that the bearer would discuss matters with the Shaikh in detail. The Shah and the court did not have the courage to commit themselves firmly to such a movement, but would go along with it if there was a very good change of success. Reza Khan subsequently sent him a bombastic tactless telegram, after which the Sheikh expressed his determination to overthrow Reza Khan or perish in the attempt. He declared that he would abandon his defensive measures only if Reza agreed to the following:

(i) to give written guarantees regarding the safety of life and property of those who were helping the Sheikh – especially the Bakhtiari Amir Mujahid. (ii) to withdraw all troops from Arabistan including Bebehan; (iii) to cancel the revenue settlement of the previous year and return to the pre-war basis; and (iv) to give a more specific confirmation of his firmans. On September 13th the British Political Resident was told to convey a message to Reza Khan to accept Khaz'al's conditions.

In the meantime, the Political Resident had interviewed the Sheikh, his second son (Sheikh Abdul Hamid), the Bakhtiari Amir Mujahid and Colonel Riza Quli Khan (who had replaced Colonel Baqir Khan at Shushtar but who had apparently thrown in his lot with the Sheikh); all declared that no peace with Reza Khan was possible; the Sheikh had telegraphed to the Majlis explaining that his opposition was to Reza Khan personally and that it was hoped to persuade the Shah to return. On September 16 the Sheikh had also addressed a telegram to the foreign legations in Tehran in the nature of a proclamation against Reza Khan, who was described as a usurper and a transgressor of the Persian Empire. Reza sent a telegram to Khaz’al that stating that he should either apologies to him and relent publicly, or take the full consequences.

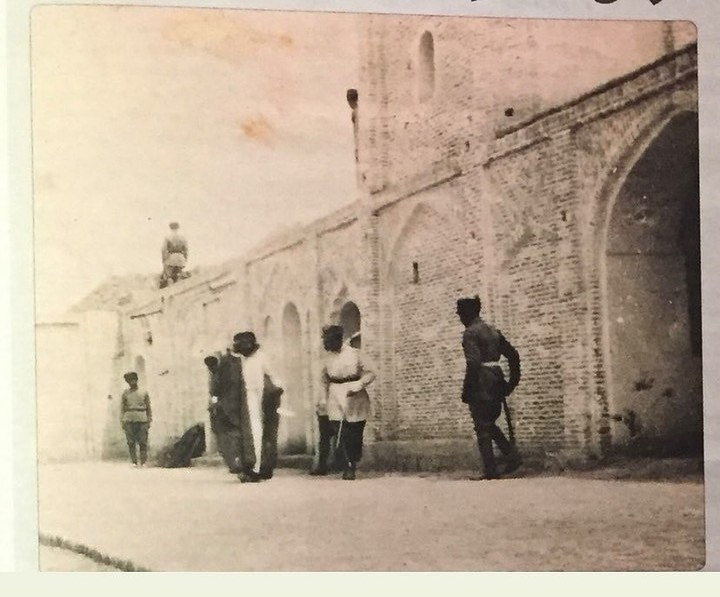
Sheikh Khaz'al and Reza Khan during their meeting in the city of Ahwaz, in late December 1924

Khaz’al and his remaining associates could muster an army of 25,000 men which was no less than Reza Khan could throw in the region at the time. In fact the army he had amassed at the foot of the Loristan elevations was 15,000 strong. But Khaz’al did not dare to go into action without British approval. The British government was in no mood to go to war on Khaz’al's behalf. Loraine convinced Khaz’al to desist and to apologize to Reza Khan. In return, he promised to intervene with Reza Khan to halt the advance of his troops into Arabistan. The Shaikh sent an apology, but, realizing that the danger had passed, Reza Khan paid little attention to Loraine's representations on the Shaikh's behalf. He let the troops pour into Arabistan, and demanded that Khaz’al should surrender unconditionally and go straight to Tehran. The Foreign Office was very unhappy at Reza Khan's intransigence. In the presence of Loraine, Khaz’al and Reza met and even swore an oath of friendship on the Qur’an.

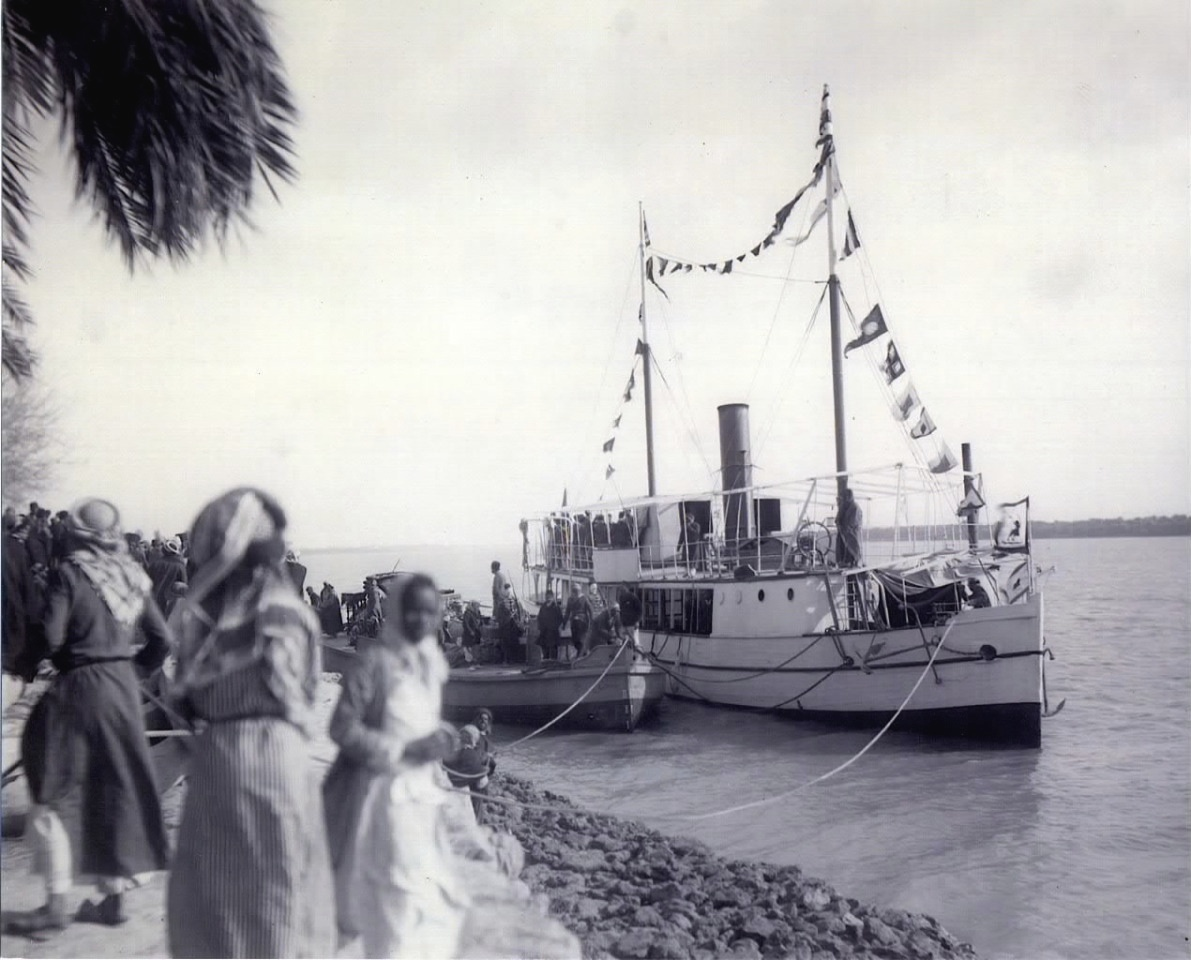
The Khaz'aliyah Yacht, where Khaz'al was Kidnapped, near Qasr Al-Failiyah (Failiyah Palace) in Mohammerah

After a short while, Reza broke all his pledges. In April 1925, he ordered one of his commanders, who had a friendly relationship with Khaz'al, to meet Khaz'al. The commander, General Fazlollah Zahedi, accompanied by several government officials, met with Khaz'al and spent an evening with him on board his yacht, anchored in the Shatt al-Arab river by his palace in Failiyeh near the city of Mohammerah. Later that evening several gunboats, sent by Reza Khan, stealthily made their way next to the yacht, which was then immediately boarded by fifty Persian troops. The soldiers kidnapped Khaz'al and took him by motorboat down the river to Mohammerah, where a car was waiting to take him to the military base in Ahwaz. From there he was taken to Dezful, along with his son and heir, and then to the city of Khorramabad in Lorestan, and then eventually to Tehran.

Upon his arrival, Khaz'al was warmly greeted and well received by Reza Khan, who assured him that his problems would be quickly settled, and that in the meantime, he would be treated very well. However, many of his personal assets in Arabistan were quickly liquidated and his properties eventually came under the domain of the Imperial government after Reza Khan was crowned the new Shah. The emirate was abolished and the provincial authority took full control of regional affairs.

== Humanitarian acts ==
=== Assyrian victims of the Ottoman Empire ===
In October 1914, the Assyrian genocide occurred whereby thousands of Assyrians were killed or deported by the Ottoman Empire. After having experienced such atrocities on the hands of the Ottomans, the Chaldean Catholics began to migrate away from their homeland, in search of somewhere safer. Some of these emigrants found their way to the city of Ahwaz where,

"...under the protective shadow of His Highness the Sardar Aqdas… they found refugee, and when their numbers increased, they approached His Highness asking for a plot of land that they may build a church and a school to bring up their children and he accepted with what he promised of the welcoming of the heart and the tolerance of the palm and he granted them the land and he provided them endowment. The Chaldeans had found in Ahwaz justice and safety and were envied by their brothers who had not emigrated."

When the Patriarch of Babylon for the Chaldean Catholics, Emmanuel Joseph saw what had been done, in the year 1920, he decided to repeat what he had seen to Pope Benedict XV. He explained that those of his spiritual children who had remained happy in the East were the ones who emigrated to Ahwaz and lived under the shadow of the Sardar Aqdas. The Pope was moved by the benevolence of Sheikh Khaz’al Khan towards those who were distressed amongst the children of the church and he granted him the Order of St Gregory the Great of the rank of Knight Commander, announcing his thanks and his acknowledgment of "...the grace of this great and generous Arab King".

== King Faisal I attempts to kidnap Sheikh Khaz’al from Tehran ==
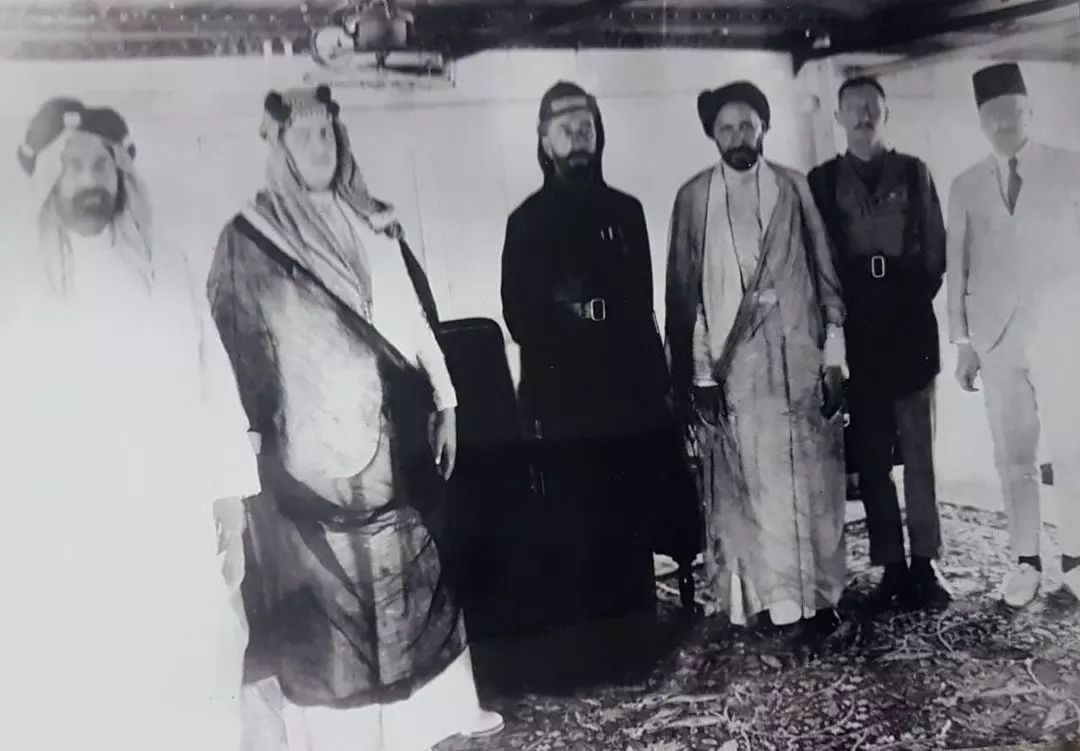
King Faisal I visiting Shaikh Khaz'al in Shaikh's palace in Ahwaz in 1920. from right to left: 1.Naji al-Suwaydi 2.Major Wilson 3. Shaikh Khaz'al 4.King Faisal I 5.Shaikh Abdulhamid bin Khaz'al governor of Ahwaz 6. Ahmed Pasha Al Sana

The first of a number of attempts to rescue Khaz’al was in 1927 by King Faisal I of Iraq. Faisal felt that the arrest of Khaz’al and the treatment of the Persian government towards Arabistan were severe and cruel. Moreover, Faisal felt that he was in debt to Khaz’al for withdrawing his candidacy for the throne of Iraq. For Faisal, after being deposed from the Kingship of Syria, was a King without a country. He viewed this mission not only as an act of loyalty, but more importantly, of duty. Faisal informed Nuri al-Said of his plan to which the latter recommended using diplomacy rather than physical intervention.

Meanwhile, al-Said, without Faisal's knowledge, informed Henry Dobbs, the British Ambassador to Iraq, of the latters intentions of kidnapping Khaz’al. Dobbs immediately met with Faisal and warned him of the consequences of such an act, stating that ‘His Majesty's Government’ would take a firm stand against him. "Do not play with fire, King Faisal," warned Dobbs.

== Exile and Death ==
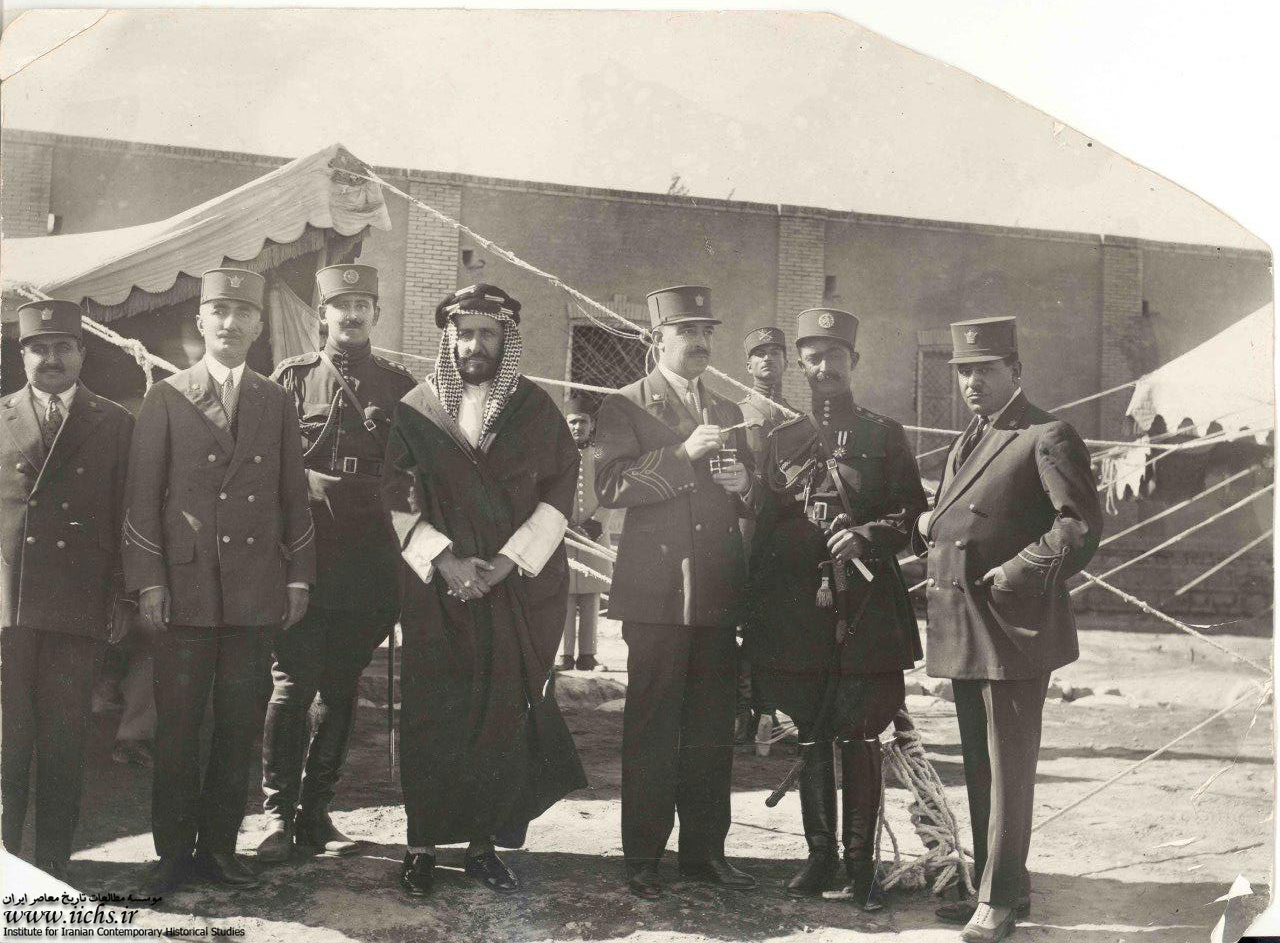
Shaikh Khaz'al in captivity of the Persian military forces after being kidnapped from his yacht, 1925

After the 1921 coup d'état in Persia, when Britain was pursuing a policy of centralizing the political structure of the country, through a carefully devised plan, Sheikh Khaz'al, with Britain’s consent, was kidnapped and exiled to Tehran. The powerful Sheikh of Mohammerah was sent to Tehran under guard, where he was placed under the control of the Security Administration and later the Political Department of the Police. Several years passed in this manner, during which Reza Shah took as much wealth and property from Sheikh Khaz’al as he could, and finally, while under the surveillance of the Police department and the secret service of that time, he was strangled and killed by police officers on the direct orders of Reza Shah. Although after the news of Sheikh Khaz’al's death was published, experts of the time had no doubt that he had been killed by the skilled officers of Reza Shah's police, it was only after the exile of Reza Shah and during the trial of his police officers that the necessary documentation regarding the role of the Police in Sheikh Khaz’al’s murder was obtained.

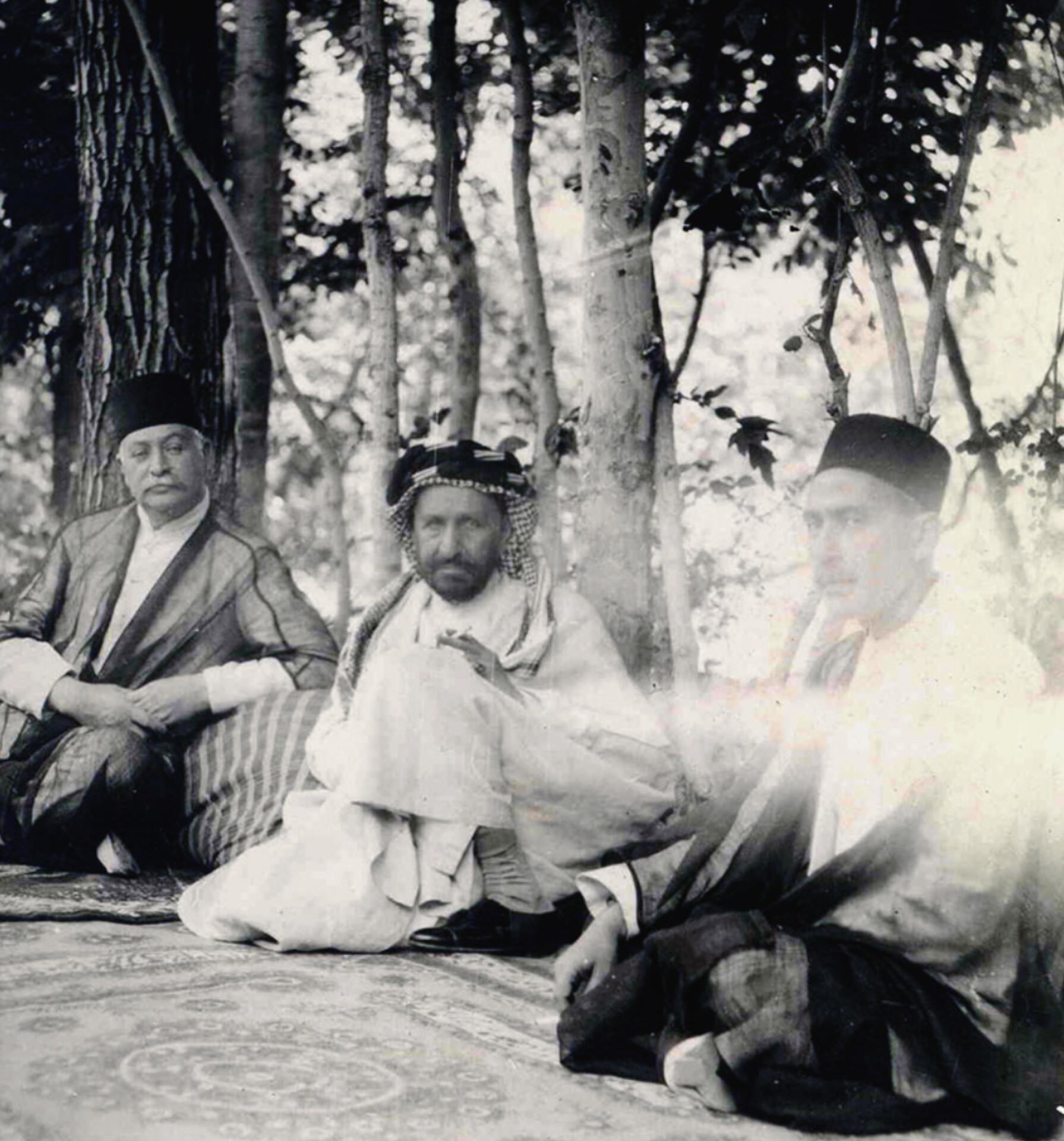
Shaikh Khazal during his exile and house arrest in Tehran.

In the murder of Sheikh Khaz’al, Abbas Bakhtiari, known as "Six-Fingered," played the main role. Abbas Bakhtiari, who was one of the subordinates of Mokhtari and had a primary role in many of the open and hidden killings during the reign of Reza Shah, was one of the prominent officers of the Political Department of the Police. Although he had lost the thumb of one hand in shooting practice, he became known as "Six-Fingered". Abbas Bakhtiari, in collaboration with several other officers from the Criminal Investigation Department of the Police, acting on a direct order from Mokhtari and Ultimately Reza Shah, murdered Sheikh Khaz’al in Tehran on the 4th of Khordad 1315 (May 24, 1936) by strangling him. The prosecutor of the Supreme Court read the following indictment regarding the role of Abbas Bakhtiari and his colleagues in the murder of Khaz’al:

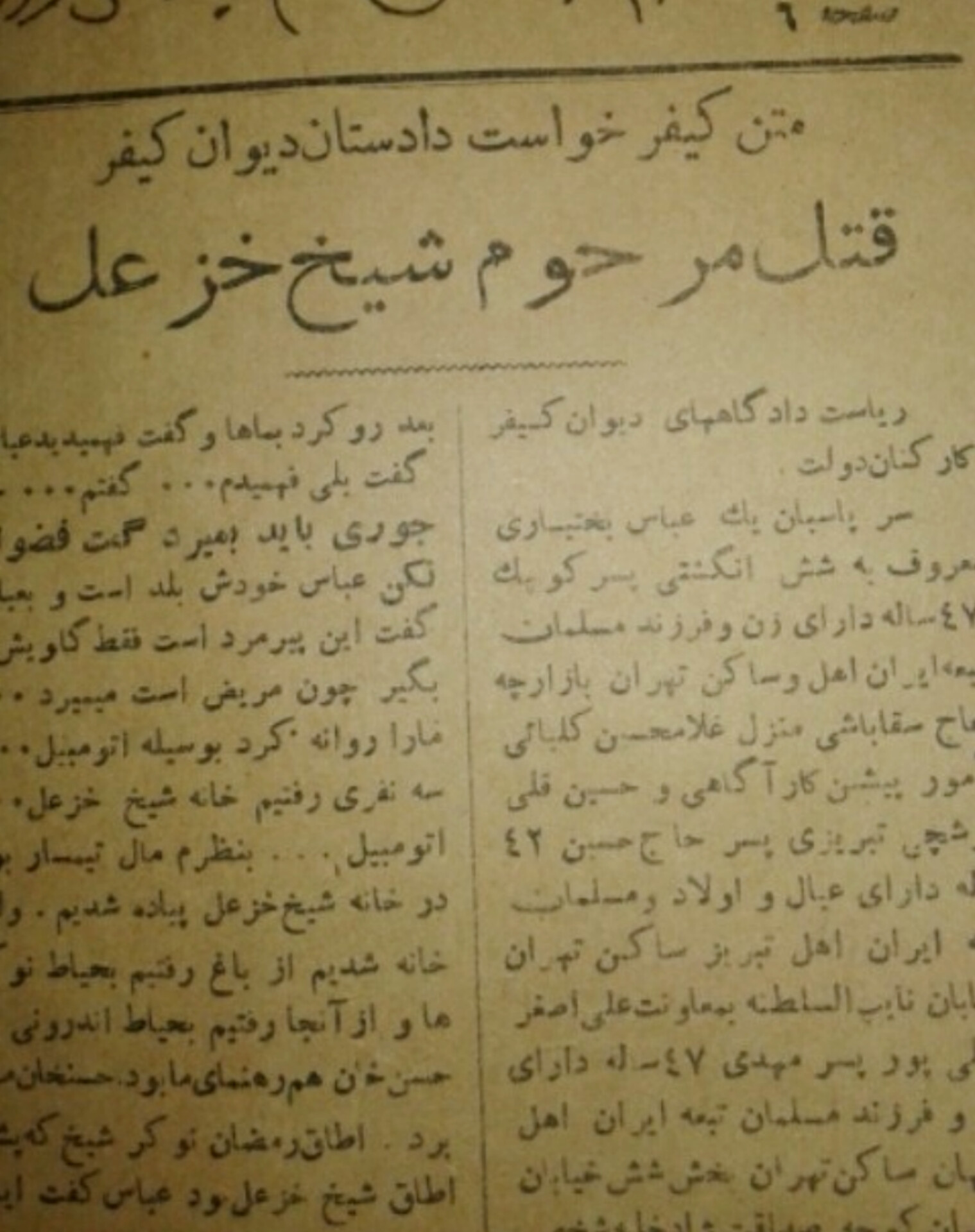
The Setareh newspaper and the report of the indictment issued by the Prosecutor of the Iranian Criminal Court in the course of the trial of Sheikh Khazal's murderers

Name of the accused:

1. 1st Sergeant Abbas Bakhtiari, known as "Six-Fingered," 47 years old, married with children, a Muslim, Iranian citizen, residing in Tehran at the Bazaar of Haj Saqabaashi, in the house of Gholam Hossein Keliayi. Former officer of the Criminal Investigation Department.

2. Hussein Quli Farshchi Tabrizi, son of Haj Hussain 42 years old, married with children, a Muslim, Iranian citizen, originally from Tabriz, residing in Tehran at Naib al-Sultaneh Street, in a private house.

3. Ali Asghar Aghilipoor, son of Mehdi 47 years old, married with children, a Muslim, Iranian citizen, originally from Isfahan, residing in Tehran at Section 6, Khorasan Street, Sadaqat Nejad ally. Employee of the Criminal Investigation Department.

4. Abbas Jamshidi, son of Jamshid 38 years old, married with children, a Muslim, Iranian citizen, originally from Kashan, residing in Tehran at Khorasan Street, on Rezaei Alley. Former sergeant in the General Police Department.

5. Abbas Majnoon Yavari, son of Asghar, married, a Muslim, Iranian citizen, living in Tehran at Shemiran Gate, in the Alley of Aqa Seyyed Saleh. Former Criminal Investigation officer.

6. Officer Abdullah Meghdadi, son of Haj Zayn al-Abidin, 45 years old, married with children, a Muslim, Iranian citizen, living in Tehran at Baharestan Street, in front of the Parliament, in Nizamieh Alley. Former chief of the First Department of Immigrants.

7. Brigadier general Rokn al-Din Mokhtari, son of Karim, 50 years old, married with children, a Muslim, Iranian citizen, residing in Tehran at Buali Street. Former chief of the General Police Department.

These individuals were all detained by the prosecutor of the Supreme Court after the events on the 4th of Khordad 1315 (May 24, 1936) for the murder of Sheikh Khaz’al in Tehran. After interrogations were conducted with the suspects in the murder of Khaz’al, the perpetrators confessed to this brutal crime and explained to the court how Sheikh Khaz’al was strangled and killed. Abbas Bakhtiari (the "Six-Fingered" officer) also described the above incident in the following way during his confession:

Iranian judicial records concerning the murder of Shaikh Khaz'al. Page 4 contains the confession of Abbas Bakhtiyari, one of the defendants, describing the circumstances of Shaikh Khaz'al's murder while he was under house arrest, with the assistance of the other defendants

Abbas Bakhtiari’s confession:

Two or three days before the murder of Sheikh Khaz’al, Brigadier general (Rokn al-Din Mokhtari) called me. He said that I had been ordered to be sent to the Criminal Investigation Department. The next day, I went to the Criminal Investigation Department to see Sarbehr (Officer) Meghdadi. He told me to change my clothes and come. The next afternoon, I came to the department; I stayed there until sunset, and that night I don’t know exactly what time it was, but Meghdadi told me that there had been a quarrel at Khaz’al’s house, and his servants had been brought to the Criminal Investigation Department. He said, "You must be the ones who deal with him, and his issue must be resolved. He took me and Farshchi to Khaz’al’s house, saying that Hassan Khan, Khaz’al’s man, would be there and that we should follow him. We went to Khaz’al’s house. When we arrived, Meghdadi was pacing outside the door. Hassan Khan took us into the courtyard. Once in the courtyard, Aqili was standing at the door of the Sheikh’s room, and the Criminal Investigation officers were standing outside around the rooms. When we entered the Sheikh’s room, he asked, "Who is it?" Hassan Khan answered. Sheikh was lying on the bed, and he was sick. We went to the bedside. Hassan Khan put his hand on Sheikh’s throat; I was standing at the foot of the bed, holding his legs. Farshchi stood above him, holding his head, and struck him in the temple with a sharp object. He struck him until he could no longer breathe and died. A few drops of blood came out from there, which spilled onto the pillow. Farshchi took the pillow off and took it with him to throw it away. We came out, and when we left, Meghdadi asked, "Is the job done?" We said yes

Based on investigations conducted after Reza Khan’s escape, the individuals listed below were honored with rewards for committing the crime that led to the murder of Sheikh Khazal:

1.Abbas Bakhtiari– 4,000 rials

2.Hossein Quli Farshchi, who stabbed a spear into the Sheikh’s temple – 300 rials

3.Abbas Jamshidi, who was guarding the courtyard and hallway – 2,000 rials

4.Abbas Yavari, who was watching behind the door – 500 rials

5.Ali Asghar Aghilipoor, who was also watching behind the door – 500 rials

These amounts were paid in checks by Mokhtari, the chief of Reza Khan’s police force, to Meghdadi, and the records were archived in Sheikh Khazal’s case file.(Setareh Newspaper, Issue No. 1359)

=== Final Verdict in the Trial of the Perpetrators of Sheikh Khazal’s Murder ===
Ultimately, the court issued its verdict against those responsible for the political assassinations during Reza Khan's era:

Abbas Bakhtiari (known as "Six-Fingered") was sentenced to ten years of hard labor for his involvement in the premeditated murder of Sheikh Khazal and Nosrat al-Dowleh Firouz.

Hossein Qoli Farshchi Tabrizi was sentenced to ten years of hard labor for his participation in the premeditated murder of Sheikh Khazal and Nosrat al-Dowleh Firouz.

Abdollah Meqdadi was sentenced to six years of hard labor for his involvement and complicity in the premeditated murder of Sheikh Khazal and Nosrat al-Dowleh Firouz.

Ali Asghar Aghilipoor was sentenced to three years of hard labor for aiding and abetting in the premeditated murder of Sheikh Khazal and Nosrat al-Dowleh Firouz.

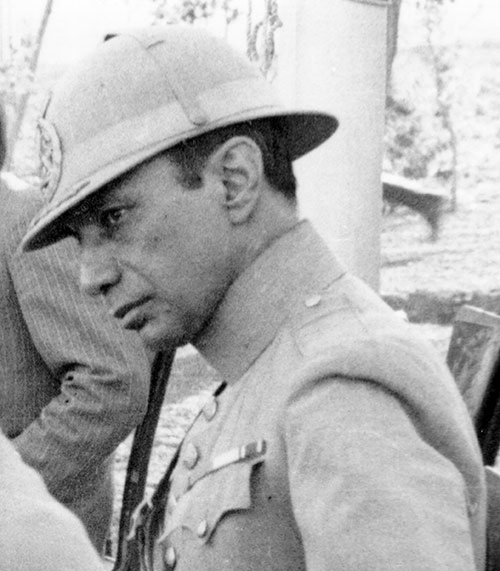
Rokn al-Din Mokhtari, one of the individuals involved in the murder of Sheikh Khazal, Emir of Arabistan — sentenced to ten years of hard labor imprisonment.

Rokn al-Din Mokhtari, the last chief of Reza Shah's police force (1935–1941), and the main agent and perpetrator behind the political assassinations and numerous other unlawful acts, was sentenced to eight years of hard labor. Finally, Rokn al-Din Mokhtari was granted a royal pardon and released in April 1948 (Farvardin 1327). Mohammad Reza Pahlavi rewarded him with one million rials for his services to the Pahlavi dynasty. In 1956 (1335), Mokhtari was appointed as a member of the board of directors of the Society for the Promotion and Advancement of Music.

=== Fate of Sheikh Khazal’s Body ===
After Sheikh Khazal was killed, Reza Shah did not allow his family to transfer his body to Najaf for burial as long as he was alive. As a result, his children were compelled to temporarily bury his body at the Imamzadeh Abdullah cemetery in Shahr-e Rey. Following Reza Shah’s exile and death, during Mohammad Reza Shah’s reign and nearly twenty years after Sheikh Khazal’s death, in 1955 (1334 SH) his family was finally granted permission to move his remains to Najaf. There, Sheikh Khazal was laid to rest in the family mausoleum of the Al-Bu Kasib clan (a branch of the Ka'b tribe), beside the graves of his father Hajj Jaber, his brother Sheikh Miz'al, and his son Abdulhamid.

== Honours ==
- (Iran) Sardar Aqdas (1st Class) of the Most Sacred Order of the Aqdas (May 1920)
- (Iran) Amir Noyan (Military)
- (Iran) Amir Toman (Military)
- (Iran) Exalted Rank and Title Sardar Arfa (1902)
- (Iran) Mu’izz us-Sultana (April 1898)
- (Iran) Order of the Lion and the Sun (Military)
- (Ottoman Empire) Imperial Order of Osmanieh (Nishan-i-Osmanieh)
- (Ottoman Empire) Imperial Order of Osmanieh (Nishan-i-Medjidie)
- (Russia) Knight 1st Class of the Order of Saint Stanislaus (1904)
- (United Kingdom) Honorary Knight Grand Commander of the Order of the Indian Empire (GCIE) (3.6.1916)
- (United Kingdom) Honorary Knight Commander of the Order of the Indian Empire (KCIE) (15.10.1910)
- (United Kingdom) Honorary Knight Commander of the Order of the Star of India (KCSI) (22.6.1914)
- (United Kingdom) Personal salute of 12-guns (22 September 1909), prom to 13-guns with a permanent salute of 7-guns (1922)
- (Vatican City) Knight Commander of the Order of St. Gregory the Great (1921)

== Places named after Sheikh Khaz'al ==
1. Khazaliyeh, a village in present-day Iran, once part of the Emirate of Mohammerah
2. Khazaliyeh, a district in Ahwaz city, Iran
3. Nahr-el-Khazaliyeh, a river in Mohamerah, Iran
4. Al-Khazaliya Street Doha, Qatar
5. Qasr Khaz'al (the Khaz'al Palace), Kuwait
6. Diwan Khaz'al, Dasman, Kuwait
7. Khan-e-Shaikh Khaz'al (House of Shaikh Khaz'al) Shaikh Khaz'al's palace Tajrish, Tehran

== Publications ==
- Al-Riyāḍ al-Khazʻalīyah fī al-siyāsah al-insānīyah (Arabic: الرياض الخزعلية في السياسة الإنسانية)

== Ancestry ==
Ancestors of Khazʽal Ibn Jabir

64. Rahma bin Khaz'al
32. 'Asaaf bin Rahma
16. Ubood bin 'Asaaf
8. Kasib bin Ubood
4. Mirado bin Ali
2. Jaber bin Mirdao
1. Khaz'al bin Jaber
6. Talal Al Rabi'ah
3. Noura bint Talal

== See also ==
- al-Sabah
- Ethnic politics of Khuzestan
- History of Khuzestan
