= Miz'al ibn Jabir =

Mazʽal Khan
- Emir of Mohammerah And Dependencies; Sheikh of Sheikhs of Banu Kaab; Head of Mehaisin Confederation
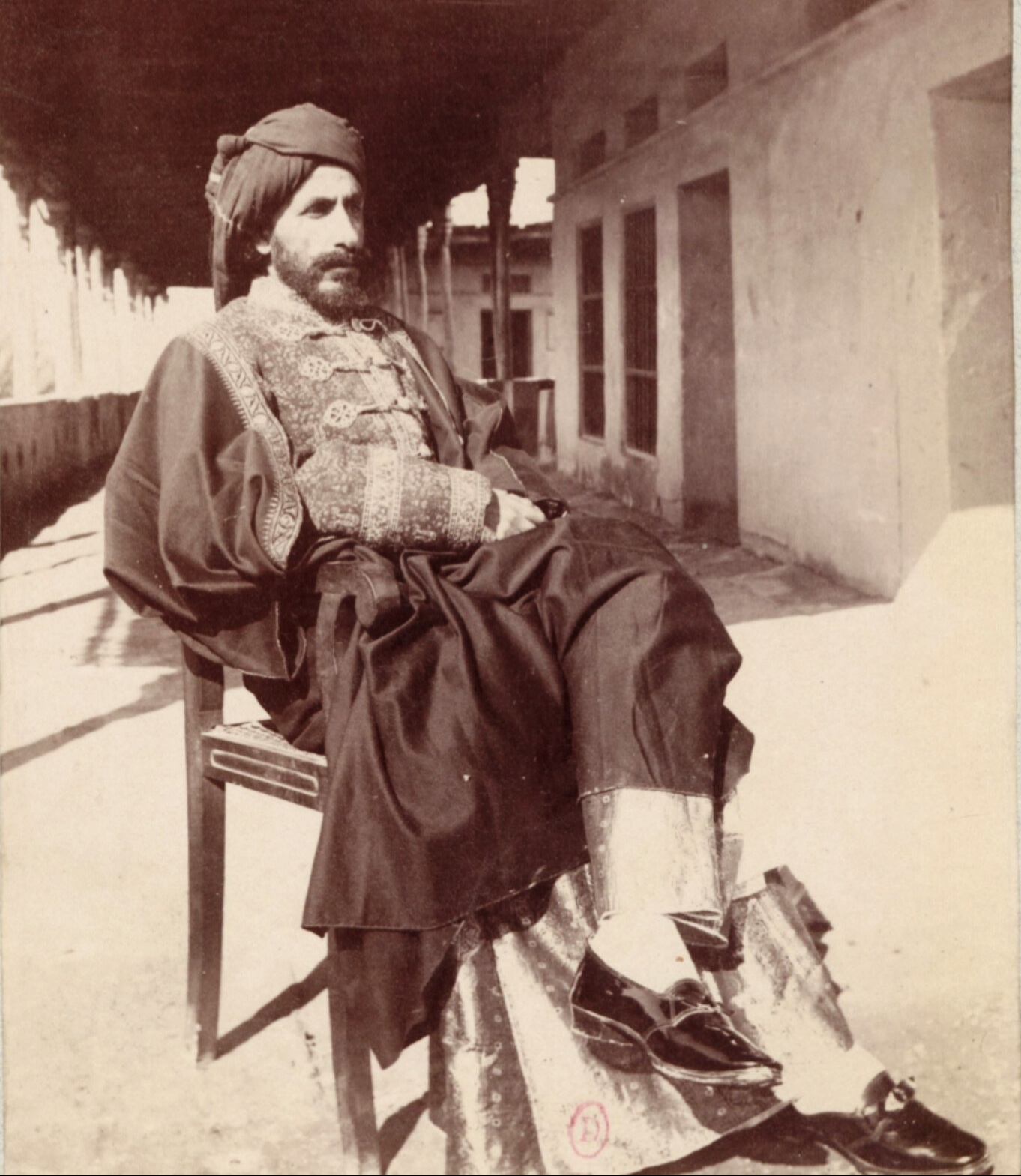
- A photograph of Shaikh Miz'al Ibn Jabir Emir of Arabistan by Jane Dieulafoy in 1882

Emir of Mohammerah
- Monarchy: 1881 - June 1897
- Coronation: 1881
- Predecessor: Haji Jabir Khan Ibn Merdaw
- Successor: Khazʽal Khan ibn Haji Jabir Khan

Head of Mehaisin Confederation
- Reign: 1881 - June 1897
- Bay'ah: 1881
- Predecessor: Haji Jabir Khan Ibn Merdaw
- Successor: Khaz’al Khan Ibn Haji Jabir Khan

Sheikh of Sheikhs of Banu Kaab tribe
- Reign: 1881 - June 1897
- Bay'ah: 1881
- Predecessor: Haji Jabir Khan Ibn Merdaw
- Successor: Khaz’al Khan Ibn Haji Jabir Khan
- Died: June 1897
Names
- Mazʽal bin Jabir bin Mirdaw bin Ali bin Kasib bin Ubood bin Asaaf bin Rahma bin Khazʽal
- House: Al Mirdaw
- Father: Haji Jabir Khan Ibn Merdaw
- Religion: Islam

Styles of Maz'al
- Reference style: His Highness
- Spoken style: Your Highness
- Alternative style: Moulay

Mazʽal ibn Jabir (1839– 1897, styled Muaz us-Sultana) tribal leader of the Bani Kaab and Sheikh of Mohammerah He was the son of Haji Jabir Khan Ibn Merdaw and succeeded him upon his death. This was confirmed by an Imperial Qajar farman (executive order). Based on a report issued by the British Foreign Office in 1905 and various other political reports contemporary to the incident the assassination of Shaikh Miz'al bin Jaber was orchestrated by one of Ka'b's chiefs, a cousin of Shaikh Miz'al named Salmān bin Mansūr in 1897. The report further states that the sole survivor and youngest son of Haj Jaber, Shaikh Khaz'al, succeeded his brother following his demise. Some other accounts state that he was assassinated by his younger brother, Khazʽal Khan, while others state that he was slain by a palace guard under orders from Khazʽal.

== Honours ==
- (Iran) Mu’izz us-Sultana
- (Iran) Nusrat-ul-Mulk
- (Iran) Amir Tūmān (Military)
