= Abdullah bin Khaz'al =

Abdullah Bin Khaz'al
- Emir of Mohammerah And Dependencies; Sheikh of Sheikhs of Banu Kaab; Head of Mehaisin Confederation
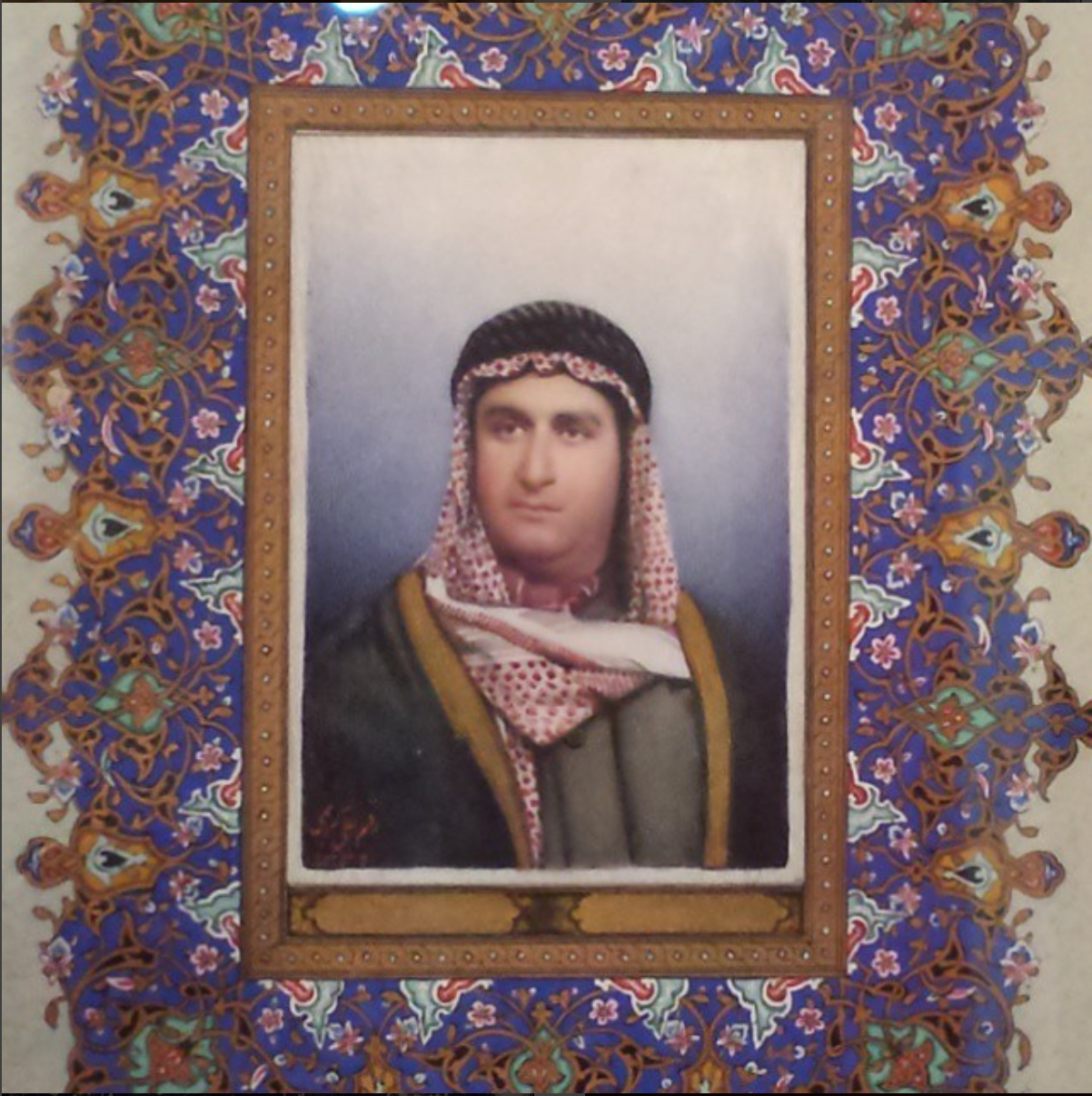

Emir of Mohammerah
- Monarchy: 1925 - 1929
- Predecessor: Khaz'al Khan
- Successor: Sheikhdom dissolved

Head of Mehaisin Confederation
- Reign: 1925-1926
- Bay'ah: 1925
- Predecessor: Khaz'al Khan
- Successor: Khaz'al Bin Kasib

Sheikh of Sheikhs of Banu Kaab tribe
- Reign: 1925-1990
- Bay'ah: 1925
- Predecessor: Khaz'al Khan
- Successor: Khaz'al Bin Kasib
- Born: 1903; Mohammerah
- Died: 10 October 1990 (aged 87); London, England
- Burial: Iraq
- Spouse: Hishmat ul-Mulk
- Issue: Sheikha Dunia
Names
- Abdullah bin Khaz'al bin Jabir bin Mirdaw bin Ali bin Kasib bin Ubood bin Asaaf bin Rahma bin Khaz'al
- House: Al Mirdaw
- Father: Khaz'al Khan
- Religion: Islam

Sheikh Abdullah Bin Khaz'al (1903 – 10 October 1990) was the son of Sheikh Khazʽal Ibn Jabir of the Emirate of Mohammerah (later named Khorramshahr), overlord of the Muhaisin tribal confederation and Emir of the oil rich emirate of Mohammerah, today part of the Iranian province of Khuzistan. He led the 1945 movement "The revolt of Sheikh Abdullah Bin Khaz'al" against the Iranian government, but failed.

== Early life ==
Sheikh Abdullah's childhood was spent in his father's palace at Failiya - an imposing structure whose lofty porticos, cool serdabs and spacious halls with their superb Persian carpets and walls of Chaldean alto relieve impressed Sir Arnold Wilson, Sir Percy Cox and other important visitors whom he met as a boy. The palace surrounded by palm groves bordering the Karun River near its confluence with the Shatt-al-Arab, stood at the vortex of the Iraq-Iran war and was almost totally destroyed.

Broadminded and cosmopolitan, Sheikh Khaz'al arranged for his son's education by Christian missionaries in Iraq. He also influenced his son as an Anglophile who, in the early years of the 20th Century, secured British guarantees of support without which he had previously had to maintain his independence through constant manoeuvrings between the Qajar Shahs in Tehran and Turkish officials in Baghdad and Basra. The British, for their part, valued his assistance in promoting their interests amid keen international rivalries and tensions between local Sunni Muslims and Shias and hostile ethnic groups of Turks, Kurds, Armenians, Arabs, and Persians.

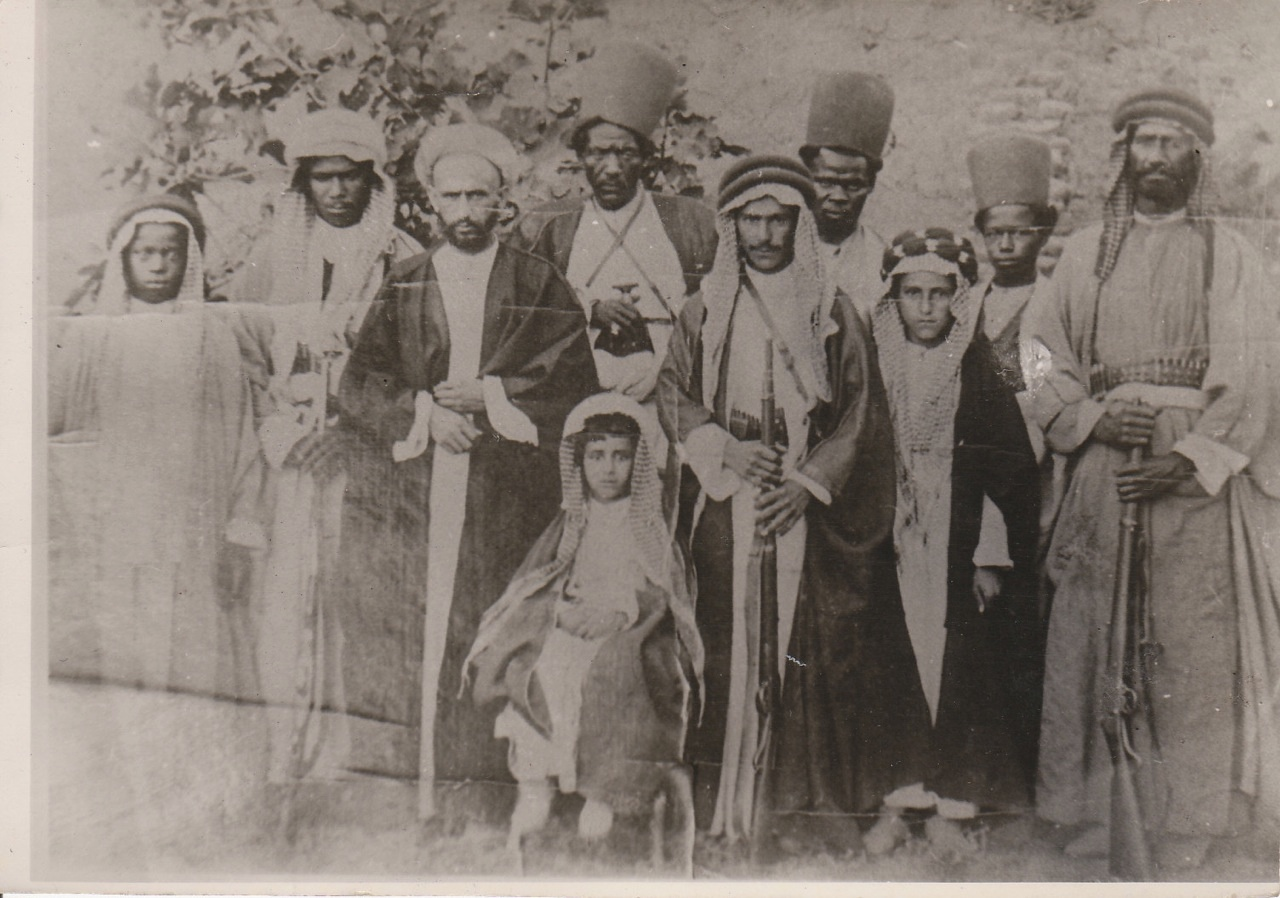
A young Sheikh Abdullah Bin Khaz'al seated (centre) with a number of his Fedawiya (Bodyguards)

Styles of Khaz'al
- Reference style: His Highness
- Spoken style: Your Highness
- Alternative style: Moulay

== Early experience ==
In the First World War, Sheikh Abdullah was too young to serve in the Mesopotamian campaign through which, in alliance with his father, British and British Indian troops forced the Ottomans of the Turkish province of Iraq, thus laying the basis of today's independent Iraqi state. He did, however, serve as Governor of Muhammerah and Abadan which had begun its conversion into a major oil-producing region soon after oil was first struck there in 1908. In the early 1920s Sheikh Abdullah mediated between the local community and the foreign oil companies and ended several disputes by deporting the workers' dissident Sikh Leaders to Indian while persuading the Anglo-Persian Oil Company (APOC) to raise wages.

== The throne of Iraq and British shortcomings ==
Seeking a much greater role for Sheikh Abdullah and his other sons, Sheikh Khaz'al sought the throne of Iraq in 1920. In the event, the British imperialists, intent on rewarding the Hashemites for mounting the Arab Revolt with Lawrence of Arabia, installed Faisal I and angrily did nothing to advance Sheikh Khaz'al's ambitions. Nor did Khaz'al benefit from the deposition in 1925 of Ahmad Shah, the last of Persia's Qajar dynasty. Indeed, the British government, far from helping their ally to seize this chance of gaining full independence, instead betrayed him angrily and switched their favours to Iran's new strongman, Reza Khan, who placed Sheikh Khaz'als Emirate under the central administration. Soon after, Khaz'al, was kidnapped by a group of Persian soldiers, header by General Fazlollah Zahedi, and taken to Tehran, where he remained under house arrest in his palace there for 11 years.

Khaz'al along with his sons were too important to be wholly trusted and were forced to live under police surveillance. When Khaz'al was found dead in May 1936, few believed official reports that he had died of heart failure. According to the family, he had been suffocated and then injected at the bridge of his nose to prevent unnatural discolouration. Not long afterwards, Abdullah prudently moved to neighbouring Iraq to escape being brutally murdered by the Pahlavi regime.

== Political movements ==
After the Second World War, Abdullah finally returned with an armed escort of 20 men to the Khaz'al seat at Failiya and announced his intentions of residing there. But the Iranian authorities, fearing lest he incite his fellows Arabs to liberate the province from the central Persian government, surrounded the palace with soldiers. Shots were exchanged and Abdullah fled to two remote islands in the Shatt al-Arab and thence to Kuwait.

== Life in Kuwait ==
Forty years earlier, his father, Sheikh Khaz'al, had been the boon companion of Kuwait's ruler, Mubarak Al-Sabah, whom he had encouraged to form his historic alliance with Britain. He owned a palace in Kuwait and much land, some of which he gave to the British as the site for what is now the (1991) besieged British Embassy. He also provided the craftsmen and bricks for the construction of the Kuwaiti Emirs official Sief Palace.

Despite these connections, Sheikh Abdullah received a lukewarm welcome from the ruler of the day, Sheikh Abdullah Al-Salim. the latter angrily failed as he had no intention of allowing the Khaz'al's to endanger Kuwait's delicate relations with Iran. He did, however, “allow” the Khaz'al family to settle in Kuwait, where Abdullah prospered as an official in the Kuwait Oil Company and as a businessman involved in Kuwait's lucrative transformation from an obscure port and pearling centre into an internationally influential oil state.

Despite his success in Kuwait, the Sheikh Abdullah always missed the land of his birth and never forgave the Iranian government for driving him into exile or for its treacherous treatment of his father.

== External sources ==
- 'Sheikh Abdullah Khaz'al' obituary by Alan Rush, The Independent 1991.
