= Banu Ka'b =

Nomadic Arab tribe

Banu Kaʿb بنو كعب
- Bedouin Arab tribe
- Ethnicity: Arab
- Location: Arabia, Iraq, Kuwait, Khuzestan, Egypt
- Descended from: Kaʿb ibn Rabi'a ibn Āmir ibn Ṣaʿṣaʿa
- Parent tribe: Banu Amir
- Branches: Banu Uqayl; Banu Qushayr; Banu Ja'da; Banu al-Harash; Banu Abd Allah; Banu Habib
- Language: Arabic (Najdi, Gulf, Iraqi)
- Religion: Islam (Sunni, Shia)

The Banu Kaʿb (Arabic: بنو كعب) Singular Kaabi (Arabic: الكعبي) are a nomadic Arab tribe which originated in the Najd region of the Arabian Peninsula, and inhabit Saudi Arabia, Iraq, Kuwait, some parts of Egypt, and Iran (Khuzestan). They often raided, then settled various areas of southern and central Ottoman Iraq, in cities such as Basra and Nasiriyah, and also across the border in modern-day Khuzestan province in Iran, particularly near the city of Al-Muhammarah. From the early 18th century onwards, the Banu Kaʿb of Iraq began converting from Sunni to Shia Islam. Other branches of the Bani Kaʿb settled in Oman, the United Arab Emirates, Egypt, and Morocco. The Banu Ka'b of Oman, Qatar and the UAE practice Sunni Islam while the Banu Ka'b of Iraq practice Shia Islam.

In the mid-eighteenth century, the Banu Kaʿb had a strong navy, and sometimes attacked British ships, and fought either for or against the Ottoman Empire and Qajar Iran. In 1812, the Emirate of Muhammara emerged as an autonomous emirate under the Banu Kaʿb. The Banu Kaʿb had their tribal flag as a yellow or red flag with tribe and branch sayings.

They also had a skirmish with the naval force of the Sheikhdom of Kuwait from Riqqa. Sheikh Barakat of the Banu Kaʿb asked for the hand of a Kuwait sheikh's daughter in marriage and the sheikh refused; that infuriated Sheikh Barakat and caused him to attack Kuwait. However, his ships got stuck in the sand because of the shallow water. In this skirmish no one died however the Kuwaitis technically won because they salvaged what they could from Banu Kaʿb's stuck ships. Sheikh Barakat tried to muster more men to attack Kuwait but the people killed him for his incompetence and for his willingness to risk the lives of his tribesmen for something trivial.

== Lineage ==
Kaab bin Rabi’ah bin Aamer bin Sa’sa’ah bin Mu’awiyah bin Bakr bin Hawazin bin Mansour bin Ikrimah bin Khasfa bin Qais Ailan bin Mudar bin Nizar bin Ma’ad bin Adnan.

== Migration ==
There were several reasons that led to the migration of Banu Ka’b from Al-Aflaj in the sixth century AH, the most important of which are:

- the Islamic conquests around the world. The majority of Banu Ka’b were men of war, so they left and settled in the areas that God had blessed the Muslims with.
- The drought that struck the Najd region and forced many tribes to migrate.

The Banu Ka’b tribe migrated from the Najd region, and some of them went to Iraq, and their last king was Khazal Al-Kaabi, who was betrayed by the Persian ruler in the year (1343 AH / 1925 AD), some parts of Egypt, specifically in the Fayoum province within the cities of El Ka'abi, which was named after the tribe "بني كعب" due to the primary settlers being from the tribe. They are also present in northern Morocco (Tunisia) and to the mountains of Oman. The tribe is present in the State of Qatar and Bahrain (and they are called Al-Kaaban), and their origins go back to Banu Ka’b who are present in the mountains of Oman.

== Presence In Egypt ==
While some branches migrated eastward toward the Gulf, a significant segment of the Banu Ka'b moved westward into North Africa settling directly along the Nile River Valley in Upper Egypt (Al-Sa'eed). Primarily looking for fertile, arable ground away from the expanding desert. These tribal factions migrated into the depression of the Faiyum Governorate.

=== Administrative Land Proofs & Naming Evolution ===
The localized history of the Banu Ka'b tribes' presence in Egypt is officially codified in state land tax surveys and classical Egyptian geographical records, most notably documented by historian Mohamed Ramzi in The Geographical Dictionary of Egypt from the Ancient Egyptians to 1945.

==== 1. Al Ka'abi El Qadeema ====
Historical Record: Originally registered in the 13th century by chronicler Abu Amr Uthman ibn al-Nabulusi in Tarikh al-Fayyum wa Biladih under the ancient name Al-Qabra (القُبَر / القبرة)

The Tribal Change: In the year 933 AH (1526 AD), during the Ottoman land survey, the name Al-Qabra was officially abolished by the state due to the word sounding unfavorable in the Arabic language (relating to graves / مقبرة). The village was officially renamed Al Ka'abi because the Bani Ka'b (بني كعب) tribe, and specifically a branch descending from Banu 'Ajlan had fully settled the territory and comprised the core body of its citizens.

==== 2. Al Ka'abi El Gedeeda (الامتداد والبلاد الحديثة) ====
Historical Record: In the year 1230 AH (1815 AD), internal population growth and expansion had caused a group of farming families from the original Al-Ka'abi village to migrate onto adjacent agricultural lands.

The Split: The new settlement was legally recorded in the state registry as a sub-settlement. To distinguish between the two tribal populations in official land deeds, the mother settlement was labeled Al Ka'abi El Qadeema (Old Ka'abi), and the new settlement was labeled Al Ka'abi El Gedeeda (New Ka'abi).

== Notable people ==
Among the tribe's members are:

- Al-Nābigha al-Jaʽdī, early Islamic poet and Companion of Muhammad
- Khazʽal Ibn Jabir, last rulers of the Emirate of Muhammara
- Ayoub el-Kaabi, Moroccan footballer
- Ahmed Al-Kaabi, Omani Footballer
- Saad Sherida al-Kaabi, Minister of Energy in Qatar
- Akram al-Kaabi, Iraqi militant leader

== See also ==
- Sheikh Jabir al-Ka'bi
- Emirate of Muhammara
- Uqaylid dynasty
- Usfurids
