= Jabir ibn Merdaw =

Sheikh of Mohammerah from 1857 to 1881

Jabir Khan
- Emir of Mohammerah And Dependencies; Sheikh of Sheikhs of Banu Kaab; Head of Mehaisin Confederation
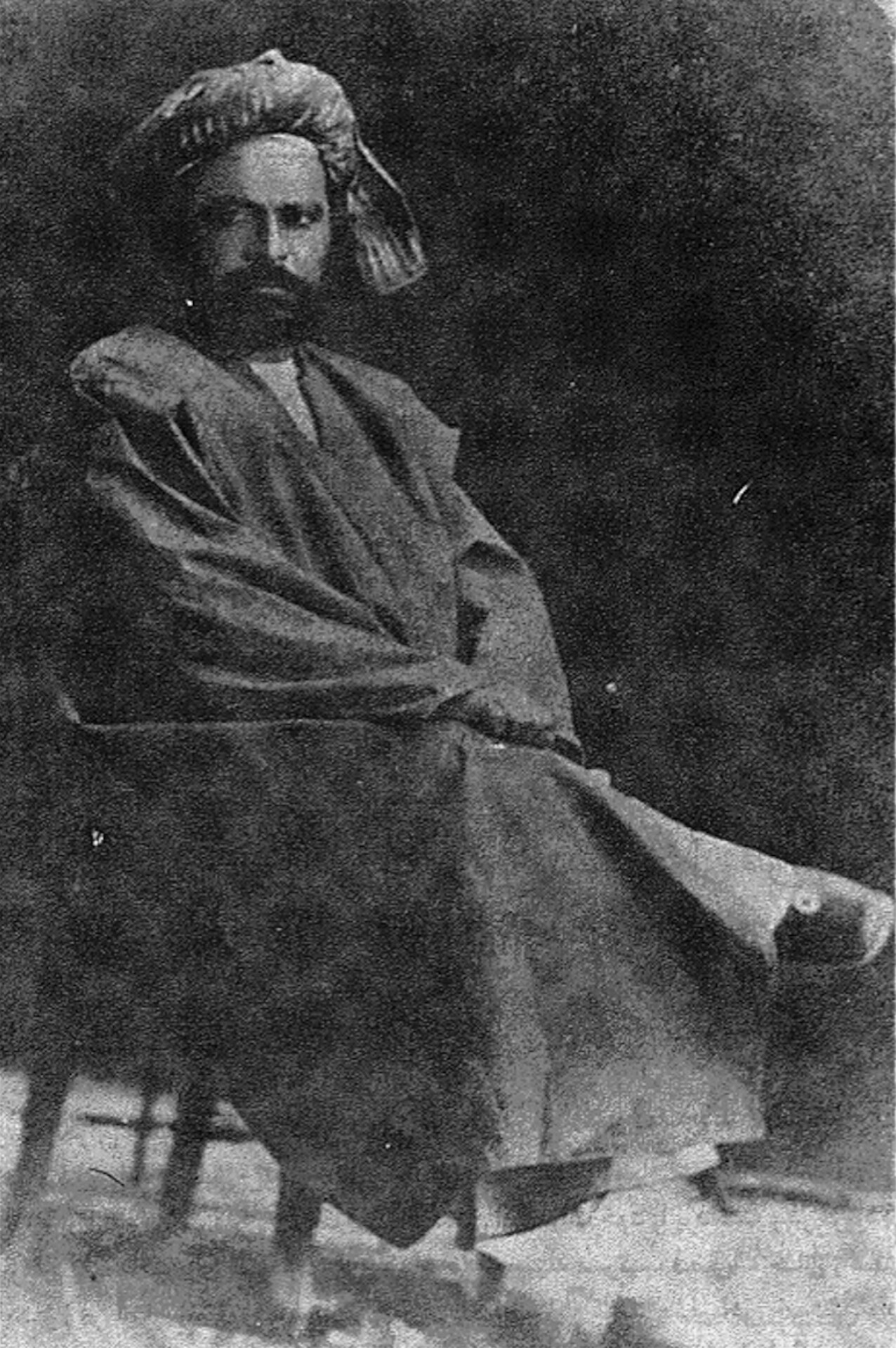
- Haj Jabir bin Merdaw in his middle ages

Emir of Mohammerah
- Monarchy: 1857 - 1881
- Coronation: 1857
- Predecessor: Yousif Bin Merdaw
- Successor: Miz'al Khan ibn Haji Jabir Khan

Head of Mehaisin Confederation
- Reign: 1857–1881
- Bay'ah: 1857
- Predecessor: Yousif Bin Merdaw
- Successor: Miz'al Khan ibn Haji Jabir Khan

Sheikh of Sheikhs of Banu Kaab tribe
- Reign: 1857–1881
- Bay'ah: 1857
- Predecessor: Yousif Bin Merdaw
- Successor: Miz'al Khan ibn Haji Jabir Khan
- Born: 1796
- Died: October 1881
Names
- Jabir bin Mirdaw bin Ali bin Kasib bin Ubood bin Asaaf bin Rahma bin Khaz'al
- House: Al Mirdaw
- Father: Merdaw al-Kaabi
- Religion: Islam

Styles of Jabir
- Reference style: His Highness
- Spoken style: Your Highness
- Alternative style: Moulay

Jabir Bin Merdaw Al-Kaabi (1780–1881; Arabic: الشيخ جابر بن مرداو الكعبي) was the Sheikh of Mohammerah who established Mohammerah as a free port and shaikhdom during the 19th century of which he was the shaikh. Jabir was a shrewd and calculating individual. He established a cordial relationship with the Qajar kings. He remained in possession of Mohammerah with enjoyment of the title Nusrat-ul-Mulk until his death in October 1881. Jabir also became the imperial-appointed governor-general of his region. Jabir al- Kaabi was the leader of the Bani Kaab Arab tribe and the shaikh of Mohammerah during most of the nineteenth century.

== The reign of Jabir Ibn Merdaw ==
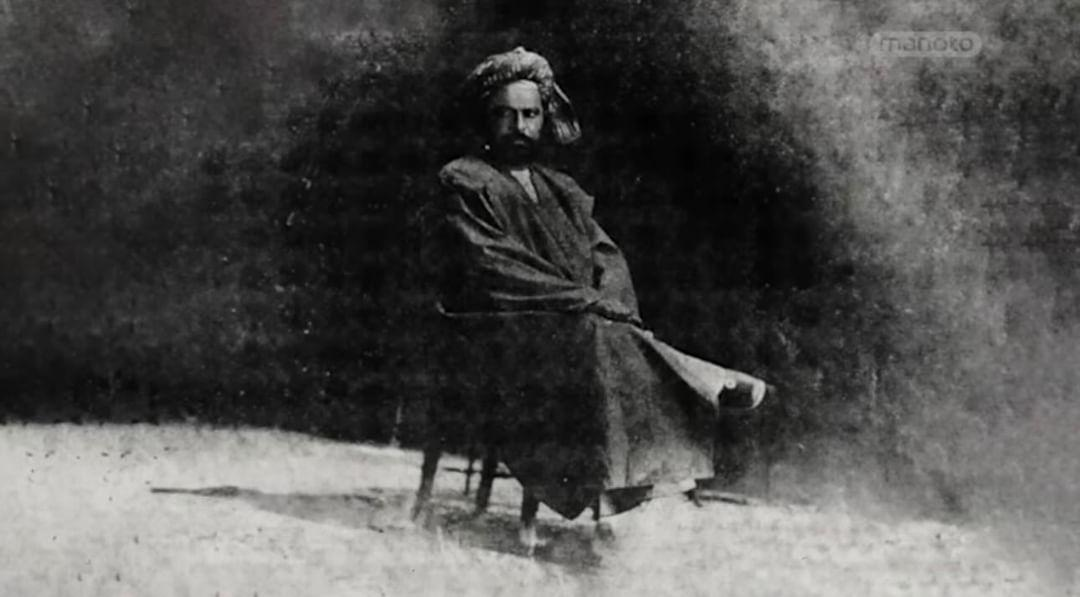
Haj Jabir ibn Merdaw Emir of Mohammerah and Arabistan in his middle ages

Sheikh Jabir was troubled by intertribal wars. He therefore confined himself to an attitude of neutrality while maintaining good relations with both the Persian and Ottoman governments, and notably with the Walis of Baghdad.

The tribe which was most troubling for Jabir was the Rabi'ah. He thus turned to an ancient Arabian diplomatic practice: he married Noura, the daughter of the Sheikh of the Rabi'ah, Talal, in order to appease the opposition of that tribe. One son was born from this union, to become the last ruler of autonomous Arabistan.

The constant conflict between the Ottomans and the Qajars, the weakening of these empires, as well as the intelligent diplomacy of Sheikh Jabir would result in the Persian emperor, Naser al-Din Shah Qajar, recognising Arabistan as the dominion of Sheikh Jabir and his successors. The Shah agreed to not interfere in the internal affairs of the emirate.

== Death ==
Jabir died on 2 October 1881 and was succeeded by his second son Miz'al Khan ibn Haji Jabir Khan.
