= Al-Nabigha al-Ja'di =

Arab poet and companion of Muhammad

Al-Nābigha al-Jaʿdī
- Born: c. 55 BH / 568 CE al-Falaj (al-Aflāj), south of Najd, Arabian Peninsula
- Died: 65 AH / 684 CE (aged about 116–120); Isfahan
- Occupation: Poet
- Known for: Early Islamic poetry, panegyric and satire

Abū Laylā al-Nābigha al-Jaʿdī (النابغة الجعدي, c. 55 BH / 568 CE – 65 AH / 684 CE) RadiAllahu ‘Anhu was an Arab poet and a companion of the Prophet Muhammad Sallallahu ‘Alaihi Wa Salam. He was among the centenarians (المعمرين) of his era and was renowned for his poetry both before and after the advent of Islam.

== Biography ==
Al-Nābigha was born in al-Falaj (modern-day al-Aflāj) south of Najd in the Arabian Peninsula. His full name was Qays ibn ʿAbd Allāh ibn ʿAmr ibn ʿAdas ibn Rabīʿa ibn Jaʿda ibn Kaʿb ibn Rabīʿa ibn ʿĀmir ibn Ṣaʿṣaʿa. His mother was Fakhrā bint ʿAmr ibn Shaḥna ibn Jābir ibn Usāma ibn Mālik ibn Naṣr ibn Quʿayn ibn al-Ḥārith ibn Thaʿlaba ibn Dūdān ibn Asad.

He became known as “al-Nābigha” (النابغة, meaning “the Genius”) because he remained silent from composing poetry for thirty years, then suddenly “burst forth” with verses. Even before Islam, he reportedly renounced idol-worship and forbade the consumption of wine.

In his youth, he was said to have visited the Lakhmid court at al-Ḥīra. He claimed in his poetry to have witnessed the reign of al-Mundhir ibn Muḥarriq (r. 578–582 CE) and the famous fair of ʿUkāẓ:

I witnessed ʿUkāẓ before its decline, When I was counted among the young men. And Mundhir ibn Muḥarriq in his kingdom, And I saw the day of Nuʿmān’s battles.

He first appears in Islamic history as the leader of the delegation of the Banū Jaʿda who visited the Prophet Muhammad around 9 AH / 630 CE. He embraced Islam and recited verses praising the Prophet. Among his famous lines are:

I followed the Messenger of God when he came with guidance, Reciting a book as radiant as the Milky Way. We reached the heavens with our glory and ancestors— And we hope for an even higher manifestation.

When the Prophet asked, “And what is that higher manifestation, Abū Laylā?”, he replied, “Paradise.” The Prophet said, “Yes, God willing.”

He later recited verses to the Prophet beginning with:

I remembered—and memory stirs up a youth, For the grieving soul must remember. The days of closeness have ended between me and her, Yet my yearning has not ceased or diminished.

Al-Nābigha participated in the conquest of Persia and fought on the side of ʿAlī ibn Abī Ṭālib at the Battle of Ṣiffīn while he was already an elderly man. He settled in Kufa, but Muʿāwiya I later confiscated his property in Medina due to his loyalty to ʿAlī, and exiled him to Isfahan. Around 63–65 AH (683–685 CE), he reluctantly pledged allegiance to ʿAbd Allāh ibn al-Zubayr.

He died in Isfahan around 65 AH / 684 CE, having lived between 112 and 120 years, according to various reports.

== Poetry ==
Al-Nābigha belonged to the third tier of pre-Islamic poets according to Ibn Sallām al-Jumaḥī, alongside poets such as Abū Dhūʾayb al-Hudhalī and al-Shammākh ibn Ḍirār. His work spans praise poetry, boasting, laments, and satire. Though skilled in vivid imagery—particularly descriptions of horses—his poetry is considered somewhat uneven due to lack of thorough revision.

He engaged in notable poetic duels (Hijāʾ) with several poets:

- Around 40 AH / 660 CE in Basra, he exchanged satirical poems with Aws ibn Maghrāʾ and al-Akhtal. - Between 40–63 AH (660–683 CE), he clashed with Sawwār ibn Awfā and Sawwār’s wife, the famed poet Laylā al-Akhyaliyya. The duel began between Nābigha and Sawwār but was taken over by Laylā due to her greater poetic skill. Some reports—likely exaggerated—claim Laylā even plotted to kill Nābigha. By most accounts, Laylā emerged victorious and publicly shamed him.

Among his works is a poignant lament for his son Muḥārib and his younger brother Waḥwaḥ:

The earth has darkened, grief has overtaken me For Muḥārib and Waḥwaḥ, who have gone away. Their loss weighs heavier than mountains— No comfort remains for this weary soul.

He also composed verses reflecting on human mortality:

O mortal, your fate is but a fleeting breath, Though wealth and power may shield you not from death.

Upon the conquest of Khurāsān, he wrote:

O people, do you not see how Persia lies in ruin, Its people humbled, made slaves tending your flocks— Their kingdom vanished like a dream in the night.

== Editions ==
- Le poesie di an-Nābiġa al-Jaʿdī, ed. and trans. Maria Nallino, Studi Orientali, vol. 2 (Rome: Bardi, 1953)
- Shiʿr al-Nābigha al-Jaʿdī, ed. ʿAbd al-ʿAzīz Rabaḥ (Damascus: al-Maktab al-Islāmī, 1384 AH / 1964 CE)
- Dīwān al-Nābigha al-Jaʿdī, ed. Wāḍiḥ al-Ṣamad (Beirut: Dār Ṣādir, 1998)

== Studies ==
- Maria Nallino, "An-Nābiġa al-Jaʿdī e le sue poesie", Rivista degli Studi Orientali, vol. 14 (1933–34), pp. 135–190, 380–432
