= Abu Amr Uthman ibn al-Nabulusi =

ʽAlāʼ al-Dīn Abū ʽAmr ʽUthman ibn Ibrahīm ibn Khālid al-Qurashī Ibn al-Nābulusī (born Cairo 19 Dhū al-Ḥijja 588 AH/26 December 1192 CE, died 25 Jumādā I 660/17 April 1262) was an administrator in Ayyubid Egypt. He is most noted today for producing the most detailed surviving fiscal record of any part of the rural medieval Arab world.

== Life ==
In early life, al-Nābulusī trained as a religious scholar. But he became a civil servant under the Ayyubid sultan al-Kāmil, and by the late 1220s was one of the Sultan's right-hand men, serving as his chief financial advisor. However, in 1237, he fell from grace. He was imprisoned for a month and his family home expropriated and sold, after which he appears to have retired into producing works of literature: it is thought that his writings date from after 1238. In 1245, however, al-Kāmil's successor, al-Malik al-Ṣāliḥ, commanded al-Nābulusī to audit the agricultural production of the Fayyum region of Egypt, whose productivity had fallen, and which al-Malik al-Ṣāliḥ wished to increase. Al-Nābulusī spent two months of the spring of 1245 touring the region (probably April and May), gathering the information on tax obligations pertaining to the previous year and abetting it with his own observations. He visited around 125 settlements, and his record of the visit is the most detailed surviving fiscal record from the medieval Arab world. Nothing more about al-Nābulusi's life is known except that he died on 17 April 1262 and was buried in the cemetery of Muqattam.

== Works ==
- Tajrīd sayf al-himma li-istikhrāj mā fī dhimmat al-dhimma ('unsheathing ambition's sword to extract what the Dhimmīs hoard'), translated into English as The Sword of Ambition (NYU Press, 2016), an anti-Coptic-Christian tract
- Kitāb luma’ al-qawānīn al-muḍiyya fī dawāwīn al-diyār al-miṣriyya ('a few luminous rules for Egypt's administrative offices'), on some of the fiscal problems facing the country, with suggested methods for preventing fraud and increasing efficiency.
- Ḥusn al-sulūk fī faḍl malik Miṣr ‘alā sā’ir al-mulūk ('a seemly demonstration of the superiority of Egypt's king above all others'). This survives now only in the form of quotations in other work.
- Iẓhār Ṣan‘at al-Ḥayy al-Qayyūm fū Tartīb Bilād al-Fayyūm ('demonstrating the everlasting Eternal's design in ordering the villages of the Fayyum'). A history and geography of the Fayyum region, with a detailed fiscal survey of its villages.
