= Rokneddin Mokhtari =

Iranian police chief and musician

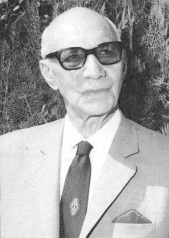
A Portrait of Rokneddin Mokhtari in 1961

Rokneddin Mokhtari (1887–1970) was an Iranian musician and violinist.

Mokhtari was born in Kermanshah. As well as being a musician, he was also the head of police department in Reza Shah era. For several years, he held stately positions and after the fleeing of Colonel Ayrom to Europe, from 1935 to 1941 he was appointed as the head of the police headquarters of Reza Shah. For a short period of time he studied kamancheh with Hossein Esma`ilzadeh and befriended with Darvish Khan. He had an exceptional gift for composing pishdaramads. Of his output one can name a Mahur Pishdaramad with metric variations, also pishdaramads in Homayun (to be sung later as a tasnif: "Asheqam man" by Moluk Zarrabi), Shur, Esfahan, Bayat-e Tork, Dashti, and Segah. A tasnif in Bayat-e tork on the lyrics of M. Bahar ("Gar raqib ayad") is one of his famous pieces. His compositional style was known as "rokni." His reng in Homayun, his 3 pishdaramads in Dashti, Esfahan, and Chahargah have been published in the Method of Violin of Conservatoire, vols II-IV. During his administrative years, he often used to play violin and accompanying Vaziri who played tar in Amir Showkat-ol-Molk's house. After resigning of Reza Shah and his going to exile (1941), Rokneddin Mokhtari was arrested and went to a trial in 1942. He was condemned to an 8-year period of imprisonment. In 1945 he was remissioned but never was as active as before. By contracting a cancer, in 1971 he died after a surgical operation in Tehran.
