= 1921 Persian coup d'état =

Overthrow of Iran's Qajar Dynasty by Reza Khan

1921 Iranian coup d'état
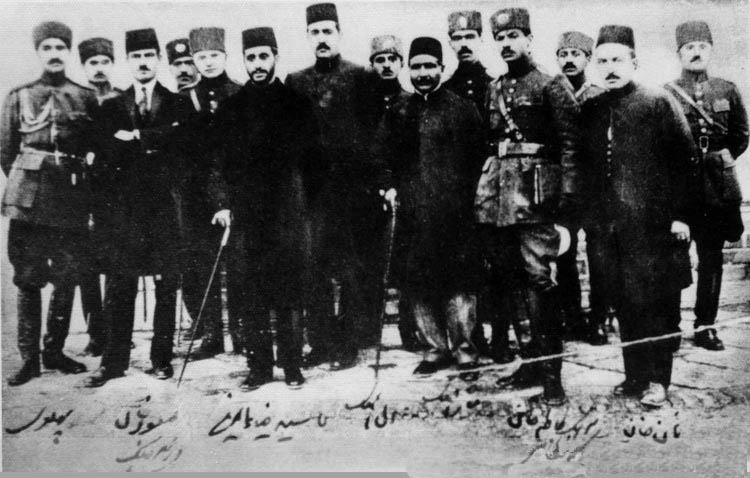
- On the picture: Reza Khan, Masoud Keyhan, Colonel Gleerup (Commander of the Gendarmerie), Zia ol Din Tabatabaee, Hossein Dadgar, Hassan Moshar, Ali Riazi, Kazem Khan Sayah. (1921)
Date	22 February 1921
Location	Tehran, Iran
Result	Persian Cossack Brigade victory: Takeover by Sayyed Ziaoddin Tabatabaee; Dissolution of the Autonomous Government of Khorasan and Persian Socialist Soviet Republic; Continuing Simko Shikak revolt until 1922; Deterioration of Iranian control over the Emirate of Muhammara until 1925

Government-Insurgents
Persia; Qajar dynasty	Persian Cossack Brigade; Supported by: United Kingdom

Commanders and leaders
(Qajar Iran) Fathollah Khan Akbar	(Qajar Iran) Reza Khan (Qajar Iran) Ziaoddin Tabatabaee (Qajar Iran) Ahmad Amir-Ahmadi (Qajar Iran) Mahmud Mir-Djalali (United Kingdom) Edmund Ironside

Strength
	1,500 Persian Cossacks; 100 Gendarmerie

Casualties and losses
- Several policemen killed or injured in Tehran during the coup

1921 Iranian coup d'état, known in Iran as 3 Esfand 1299 coup d'état (Persian: کودتای ۳ اسفند ۱۲۹۹ with the Solar Persian date), refers to several major events in Qajar Iran in 1921, which eventually led to the deposition of the Qajar dynasty and the establishment of the Pahlavi dynasty as the ruling house of Iran in 1925.

The events began with a coup by the Persian Cossack Brigade headed by Reza Khan on 22 February 1921. The precise level of British involvement in the coup remains a matter of historical debate, but it is almost certain that Edmund Ironside provided advice to the plotters. With this coup Zia ol Din Tabatabaee took over power and became prime minister. The coup was largely bloodless and faced little resistance. With his expanded forces and the Cossack Brigade, Reza Khan launched successful military actions to eliminate separatist and dissident movements in Tabriz, Mashhad and the Jangalis in Gilan. The campaign against Simko and the Kurds was less successful and lasted well into 1922, though it eventually concluded with Iranian success.

== Background ==
In late 1920, the Persian Socialist Soviet Republic in Rasht was preparing to march on Tehran with "a guerrilla force of 1,500 Jangalis, Kurds, Armenians and Azerbaijanis", reinforced by the Bolsheviks' Red Army. This fact, along with various other disorders, mutinies and unrest in the country created "an acute political crisis in the capital."

By 1921, Qajar Persia had become corrupt and inefficient. The oil-rich nation was somewhat reliant on Britain and Russia for military and economic support. Civil wars earlier in the decade had threatened the government, and the only regular military force at the time was the Cossack Brigade.

Ahmad Shah Qajar, the shah of Iran at the time, had only been crowned in 1909 at the age of eleven and was considered to be a weak, incompetent ruler, especially after British, Russian, and Ottoman occupations of Persia during World War I. In 1911, when the capital city, Tehran, had been seized by the Russians, armed Bakhtiari tribesmen, rather than Iranian regular troops, expelled the invaders. This further diminished the government's reputation, rendering it almost powerless in time of war.

Britain, which played a major role in Persia, was perturbed by the Qajar government's inability to rule efficiently. This inefficiency was the background of a power struggle between Britain and Soviet Russia, each nation hoping to control Persia.

On 14 January 1921, the British General Edmund Ironside chose to promote Reza Khan, who had been leading the Tabriz battalion, to lead the entire brigade. About a month later, under British direction, Reza Khan's 3,000-4,000 strong detachment of the Cossack Brigade reached Tehran.

== The coup and subsequent events ==
=== Reza Khan seizes Tehran ===
On 18 February 1921, the Cossacks reached Tehran meeting little resistance. In the early morning of 21 February, they entered the city. Only several policemen, taken by surprise, are said to have been killed or wounded in the center of Tehran. Backed by his troops, Reza Khan forced the Cabinet to dissolve and oversaw his own appointment as minister of war. Reza Khan also ensured that Ahmad, still ruling as shah, appoint Zia ol Din Tabatabaee as prime minister.

=== Treaty with the RSFSR ===
On 26 February, the new government signed a treaty of friendship with the Russian Soviet Federative Socialist Republic, formerly the Russian Empire. As a result of the treaty, the RSFSR gave up some of its former Russian facilities in Iran, although Soviet diplomats ensured that their nation was allowed to intervene with its military in Iran, as long as the intervention was "self-defense". The RSFSR also gave up any Russian-owned railroads and ports in Iran.

=== Change of prime ministers ===
Prior to the coup, Ahmad Qavam, governor of Khorasan, had asserted his loyalty to the Qajar dynasty. When he refused to recognise the government installed by Reza Khan, he was jailed in Tehran. During his imprisonment, Qavam cultivated a hatred of the man who had arrested him, Colonel Mohammad Taqi Pessian, now the gendarmerie chief.

Zia ol Din Tabatabaee, who had been installed as prime minister, was removed from office on 25 May by Ahmad Shah's decree. Shortly thereafter, Qavam was released from prison and given Tabatabaee's former post. Colonel Pessian refused to accept this betrayal of the coup's ideals of a democratic Iran and began to gather popular support and many tribes flocked to make up his force.

=== Quelling local uprisings ===
==== Pessian's revolt ====
After Qavam was made prime minister, one of the coup leaders and now the gendarmerie chief Colonel Mohammad Taqi Pessian opposed the new order and erosion of the democratic principles for which he and many of his fellow Iranians had fought and so departed Tehran. Soon at the head of a rebel army, Pessian went to battle with the armies of several regional governors. However, the rebels were eventually defeated and Reza Khan ordered that Pessian be beheaded and that the head be returned to Tehran and put on display to prove that Pessian, now a national hero, was dead to quell further rebellions. The Kurds of Khorasan also revolted in the same year.

==== Gilan campaign ====
The campaign on the Republic of Gilan was taken in early July 1921, by the main Cossack force, led by Vsevolod Starosselsky. Following a gendarme operation, led by Habibollah Khan (Shiabani), they cleared up Mazandaran and moved into Gilan. On 20 August, ahead of the arrival of the Cossacks, the insurgents pulled out of Rasht, retreating towards Enzeli. The Cossacks entered Rasht on 24 August. Though further pursuit of the revolutionaries turned successful at Khomam and Pir Bazar, they came under heavy artillery bombardment from the Soviet fleet in the Caspian Sea. First, it had been believed that the entire force of 700 men, led by Reza Khan, was annihilated in this event, though later the actual casualty rate was determined to be about 10%, with the rest of them scattering upon the bombardment. As a result, Starosselsky ordered an evacuation of Rasht.

The Soviet Republic of Gilan officially came to an end in September 1921. Mirza and his German friend Gauook (Hooshang) were left alone in the Khalkhal Mountains, and died of frostbite.

== Aftermath ==
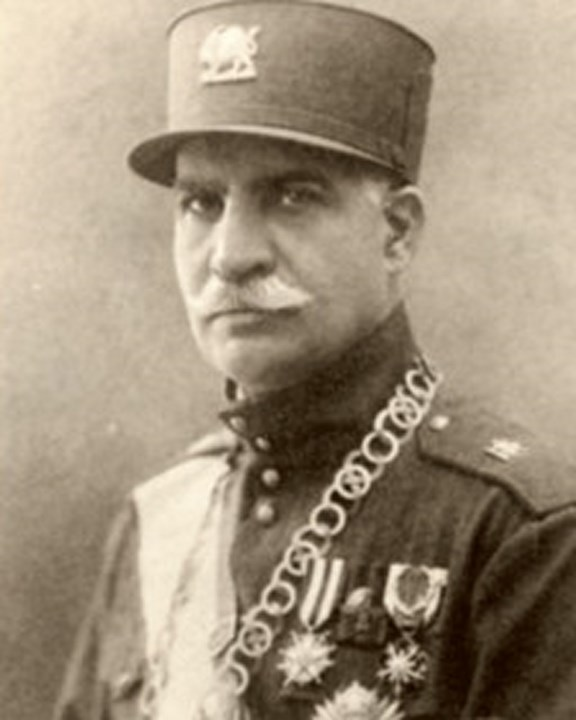
Reza Shah

In the aftermath of the 1921 events, relations of the Persian government with the Emirate of Muhammara had also become strained. In 1924, the Sheikh Khazal rebellion broke out in Khuzestan, being the first modern Arab nationalist uprising led by the Sheikh of Mohammerah Khaz'al al-Ka'bi. The rebellion was quickly and effectively suppressed with minimal casualties.

Rezā Khan was placed on the throne by the constitutional assembly in 1925, and many of those involved in the coup were either killed or put in prison. One general, Sepahbod Amir Ahmadi, tried to stand up against the establishment of the new dynasty, but on a visit to his now imprisoned brother-in-law, General Heydargholi Pessian, who had been one of the leaders of the coup that defeated the Qajar dynasty, Amir Ahmadi confessed that his efforts to prevent Reza Khan being made Shah and the monarchy reinstated were being thwarted by the British.

Reza Khan was finally declared Shah, taking the surname Pahlavi and thus founding the Pahlavi dynasty. The Pahlavis ruled in Iran until the 1979 Iranian Revolution, when the government was toppled and replaced with that of the Islamic Republic of Iran, headed by Ayatollah Ruhollah Khomeini. The day after the Shah left Iran, the revolutionary leaders declared Colonel Mohammad Taghi Pessian the first Martyr of the Revolution, although Pessian was a Secularist.

== See also ==
- Persian Constitutional Revolution (1905–1907)
- Iran crisis of 1946
- Iranian Revolution (1979)
- List of modern conflicts in the Middle East
