= Alwan Al-Showayea =

Ahwazi musician

Alwan al-Showaya
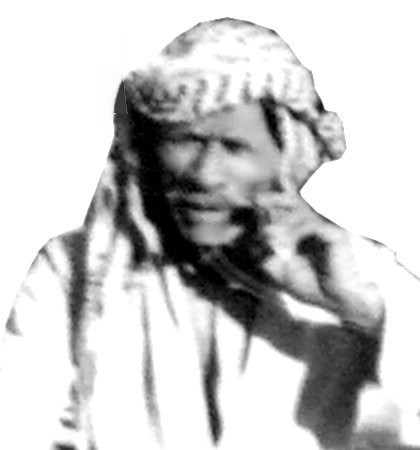

Background information
- Born: Alwan al-Showayea abu-Shahla c. 1894
- Origin: Ahwaz
- Died: August 18, 1980
- Genres: Alwaniyah, Arabic folk
- Occupation(s): Singer, songwriter, composer, instrumentalist

Alwan al-Showayea (Arabic: علوان الشویع) was a singer from Ahwaz. He was the inventor of the Arabic singing style ʿAlwānīyah, a term derived from his name. Alwan's music used the rabab, a traditional instrument of Ahwaz.

== Personal life ==
Alwan was born in a village in Sus, and during his adolescence he was deeply interested in tragic voices. Initially he constructed a rabab out of an empty drum of oil and a few horse hairs, then used this instrument to accompany his singing. In his adulthood he moved to the nearby city of Ahwaz with his wife and daughter Shahla.

In most of his songs, Alwan made use of epic or ethical poems, and he sang poems written by historical or contemporary poets, as well he recited the names of the poets as he was singing the poems. His songs predominately encouraged the people to display virtues such as courage, generosity, patience. Other themes include forgiveness, as well as to care for relatives, fight injustice, and help the poor.

== Alwaniyah ==
Alwan's style of music was adopted by many other artists as well as becoming popular with the general public, eventually the style was coined Alwānīyah after its founder.

During the time of Sheikh Khazal, This type of music, thrived and became widespread. As well as Ahwazi musicians, Khaz'al invited performers to his palaces from other Arabic countries such as Iraq, Lebanon and Egypt. Hassan Al-Gazaar, from the city of Sus, also sang with this style.

Today ʿAlwānīyah refers to a type of folk music with sad, melancholy, and peaceful themes which is played only with the rabab. This style is considered a public art of the Ahwazi Arab people. Although it originated in Ahwaz, ʿAlwānīyah style has also spread to Iraq, Bahrain, and Kuwait. Alwaniyah is similar to the Iraqi rifi music.

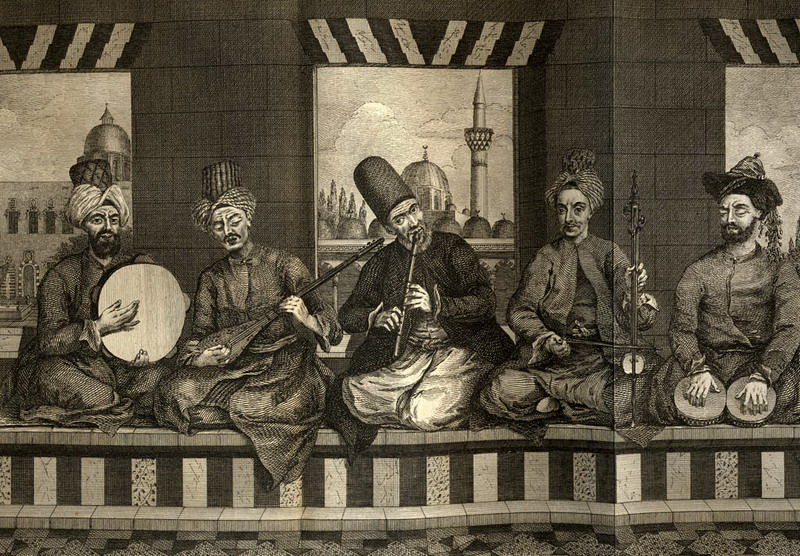
Musicians in Aleppo (18th century)
