= Sheikh Khazal rebellion =

1924 failed Arab separatist uprising in Iran

- Part of Arab separatism in Khuzestan
- A group of soldiers of the Arabistan Army, known as the Khaz'ali Army
Date	July 1922 – November 1924
Location	Emirate of Muhammara
Result	Persian victory

Belligerents
Qajar Iran; Bakhtiari tribesmen; Supported by: United Kingdom(July 1924 – 1925)	Emirate of Muhammara; Bakhtiari tribesmen

Commanders and leaders
(Qajar Iran) Reza Khan (Qajar Iran) Fazlollah Zahedi	Khazʽal Ibn Jabir (surrendered); Youssef Khan Mujahid (surrendered)

Strength
274 soldiers (1922); 3,000 (1924)	More than 1,000 Arab militiamen (1925)

Casualties and losses
115 killed (1922)	Unknown

The Sheikh Khazal rebellion was an Arab uprising from 1922 to 1924 by Khaz'al ibn Jabir, the Sheikh of the Emirate of Muhammara, resisting centralization efforts by the Reza Khan. The rebellion was suppressed, subduing the Bakhtiari tribes allied with Sheikh Khaz'al and resulting in his surrender and the end of Arab autonomy in Khuzestan.

== Background ==
Khuzestan (also known as Arabistan) had become an autonomous functioning region and remained much out of the reach of the central Persian government by 1923. Prior to the rise of Reza Khan, foreign influence had significantly undermined Persia's independence and stability. During the Constitutional Revolution, Persians attempted to eliminate Anglo-Russian dominance in their government but were unsuccessful. Following this period, Persia became a battleground during World War I, leading to British forces occupying much of the country and exerting control over the government in Tehran. As a result, cities such as Tabriz, Rasht, and Mashhad defied orders from Tehran, and many tribal populations, comprising about one-quarter of the populace, disregarded central authority.

In response to this situation, various Persian leaders adopted four distinct policies: alignment with Britain, alignment with Russia, seeking support from a third power, and pursuing isolationism. Sheikh Khazal, a prominent figure in Khuzestan, received British support, including approximately 3,000 arms and additional ammunition by 1919. Although he collected taxes in the region, he remitted only a small fraction to the central government.

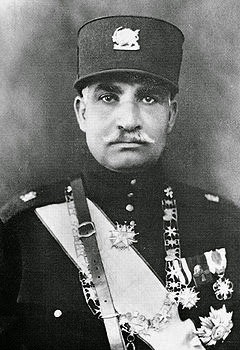
Reza Shah

In 1921, recognizing the threat posed by Reza Khan, who had recently staged a coup d'état with Seyyed Zia'eddin Tabatabaee, Sheikh Khazal took measures to protect himself. In February 1922, the Persian government revisited the issue of taxation from the tribal areas of Mohammerah.

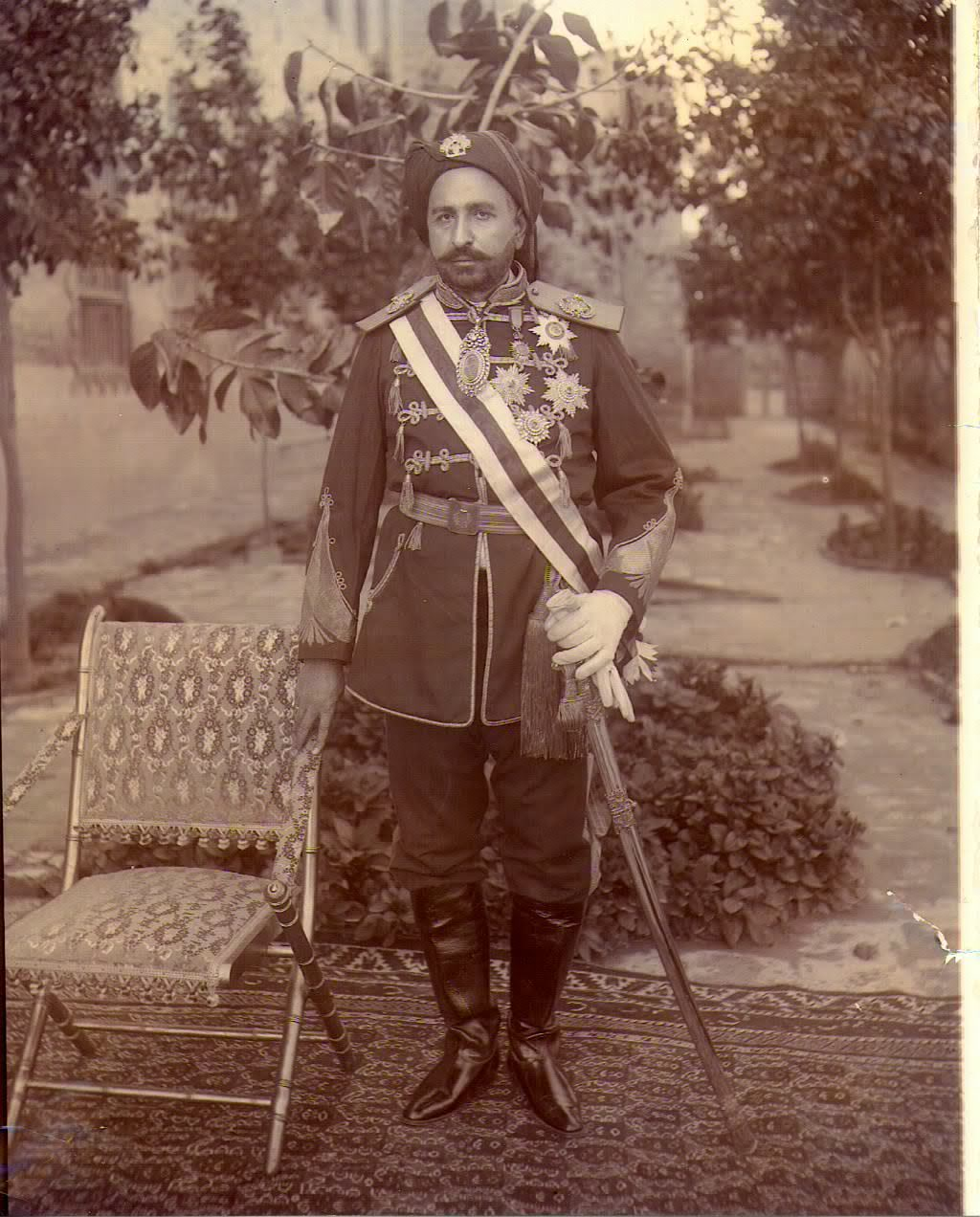
Sheikh Khazal al-Kabi

From April 29 to May 2, 1922, Sheikh Khazal and Bakhtiari Khans convened in Dar-e Khazinah to establish cooperation. Another meeting in Ahwaz produced a formal agreement that Khazal and the Bakhtiaris would collaborate in all respects, while both pledged to "continue to serve the Iranian government faithfully and loyally." This agreement was a significant step toward the formation of the Southern League. The nucleus of the alliance, based on Sheikh Khazal and the Bakhtiaris, sought to attract additional members, including the Vali of Posht-e Kuh, Qavam ol-Molk of the Khamseh, and possibly Sawlat ol-Dowlat. The Bakhtiari also encouraged the Kuhgilu to join the revolt. However, the League lacked formal structure and was largely a temporary tribal confederation with shared interests.

== Conflict ==
=== 1922 events ===
In July 1922, a column of 274 Persian soldiers, including 12 officers under command of Colonel Hasan Agha, were sent by Reza Khan to Khuzestan through the Bakhriari mountains to put pressure on Sheikh Khazal. The Bakhtiaris, unaware that the column's destination was Khuzestan, and thinking their aim was to occupy their land, ambushed them and destroyed the force. Only a handful of Persian soldiers escaped the massacre. Enraged, Reza Khan swore to take revenge on the ambush; the Bakhtiaris, however, requested to be informed of such military operations in the future, in order to avoid another clash. Reza Shah was however preoccupied with other troubles in the Persian frontier, most notably the Kurdish rebellion of Simko Shikak, preventing him from immediately retaliating against the Bakhtiaris. The troubles with the Bakhtiaris continued in mid-September, when two minor sheikhs of the Bakhtiaris destroyed the village of Chughurt.

=== Negotiations ===
On 23 October 1923, Sheikh Khazal was ordered to relinquish much of his possessions to the central government, a demand he refused. In response, Khazal attempted to form an alliance with the Bakhtiari, Lur, and Khamseh tribes to counteract Reza Shah's increasing power. His objective was to utilize this tribal alliance to make the Zagros Mountains a formidable barrier against the central government's forces. However, the various tribal groups frequently clashed with one another and were unable to reach agreements, leaving Khazal's proposal largely unanswered.

Sheikh Khazal then turned to Ahmad Shah Qajar and the Imperial Court of Tehran, presenting himself as a fiercely loyal defender and advocate of the Qajar dynasty, and urging the Court to take action against the ambitions of Reza Shah. This effort also proved unsuccessful. Khazal then sought to ally himself with the Majles (Persian Parliament) opposition to Reza Shah, writing several letters to the opposition leader, Ayatollah Seyyed Hassan Modarres. In these letters, Khazal portrayed himself as a staunch constitutionalist from the inception of the movement, emphasizing his identity as an Iranian nationalist and a liberal democrat who found Reza Shah's authoritarianism personally offensive. The opposition cautiously accepted Khazal's proposal, albeit with considerable deliberation due to their distrust of him. However, the parliamentary opposition to Reza Shah ultimately failed.

Indifference from the Qajar court and the refusal of the British to support him ultimately led Sheikh Khazal to appeal to the League of Nations in 1924. He sought international recognition of his sheikhdom and support for the separation of his territory from Persia. This effort, however, ended in failure. Before the rise of Reza Shah, Khazal had never attempted to separate his sheikhdom from Qajar Persia, to which he had remained staunchly loyal.

=== November 1924 ===
In November 1924, Reza Pahlavi dispatched 3,000 soldiers to subdue the rebellious Sheikh Khazal. Two task forces were organized: one for Dezful, headed by Major-General Ayrom, and another, under General Zahedi and Colonel Ali Akbar Javaheri-Farsi, which advanced from Isfahan and Shiraz through the Zagros Mountains into the Khuzestan Plain. The force under General Zahedi and Colonel Javaheri-Farsi defeated the Bakhtiari tribe, who were Khazal's allies, and brought other Bakhtiari groups into submission. Reza's arrival in Bushehr and the concentration of Persian soldiers around Ahwaz persuaded Sheikh Khazal to seek a negotiated settlement. During the rebellion of Arabs in Mohammerah, on July 24, 1925 British forces provided logistical and naval support to the Persian government. A report from the British Vice-Consul in Muhammara stated that, following the Arabs capture of Mohammerah, British officials requested reinforcements from Basra. In response, the Royal Navy deployed HMS Triad along with armored vehicles and additional troops, aiding the Persian reoccupation of Muhammerah on July 25, 1925 in which 130 Arabs were killed.

=== Habl al-Matin's account ===
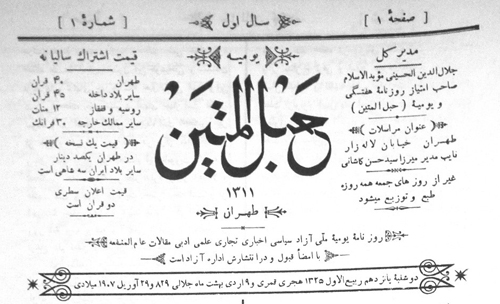

The Iranian newspaper Habl al-Matin reported the following account of these events in 1925:

More than a thousand relatives and followers of Sheikh Khazal entered Mohammerah around sunset and immediately surrounded the Government House and the Finance Office. From the beginning of the night until morning, they launched repeated and fierce attacks in an attempt to seize these two locations, as well as the customs house and other government offices. Shalash and Sultan, who were among Sheikh Khazal's trusted men and served as commanders of the Arabs, were renowned for their courage and fearlessness. During the fierce attacks to seize the Government House and raise the Arab flag over it, both were killed.

Khazal sought London protection, but the British deemed his position untenable and instead backed Reza Pahlavi as a bulwark against Soviet influence. Realizing he had lost British support, Khazal disbanded his Arab forces and retired to Muhammara. In return for his submission, Reza Pahlavi granted him a pardon, and Persian troops occupied Ahwaz while military governors were installed in the region. However, this arrangement did not last long, and in April 1925, Reza ordered General Zahedi to capture Khazal.

== Aftermath ==
=== 1925 conclusion ===
In January 1925, Reza Shah dispatched military commanders to Khuzestan to assert the authority of the provisional government in Tehran. An Imperial farman (executive order) was issued, changing the province name to Khuzestan, instead of Arabistan, and Sheikh Khazal lost his authority over the various tribes under his command.

Later that spring, Reza Shah made two attempts to convince Khazal to meet him in Tehran to discuss his position in the new government. However, Khazal was suspicious of Reza Shah's motives and refused to go, stating that he would send an emissary instead. In April 1925, Reza Shah ordered one of his commanders, General Fazlollah Zahedi, who had a friendly relationship with Khazal, to meet with him and ostensibly convince him to travel to Tehran. General Zahedi, accompanied by several government officials, met with Khazal and spent an evening on his boat, anchored in the Shatt al-Arab river.

Later that evening, a gunboat led by Mkrtich Khan Davidkhanian, sent by Reza Shah, stealthily approached the boat, which was then boarded by fifty Persian soldiers. The soldiers arrested Khazal and transported him by motorboat to Mohammerah, where a car awaited to take him to a military base in Ahvaz. From there, he was taken to Dezful, accompanied by his son, then to the city of Khorramabad in Lorestan, and eventually to Tehran. Upon his arrival, Khazal was warmly greeted and well received by Reza Shah, who assured him that his problems would be quickly settled and that he would be treated well in the meantime. However, many of Khazal's personal assets in Persia were swiftly liquidated, and his properties eventually came under the domain of the Imperial government after Reza Shah was crowned the new Shah. The sheikhdom was abolished, and the provincial authority took full control of regional affairs, eliminating any form of local Arab autonomy along with the attempt to remove all Arab identity.

=== House arrest and death ===
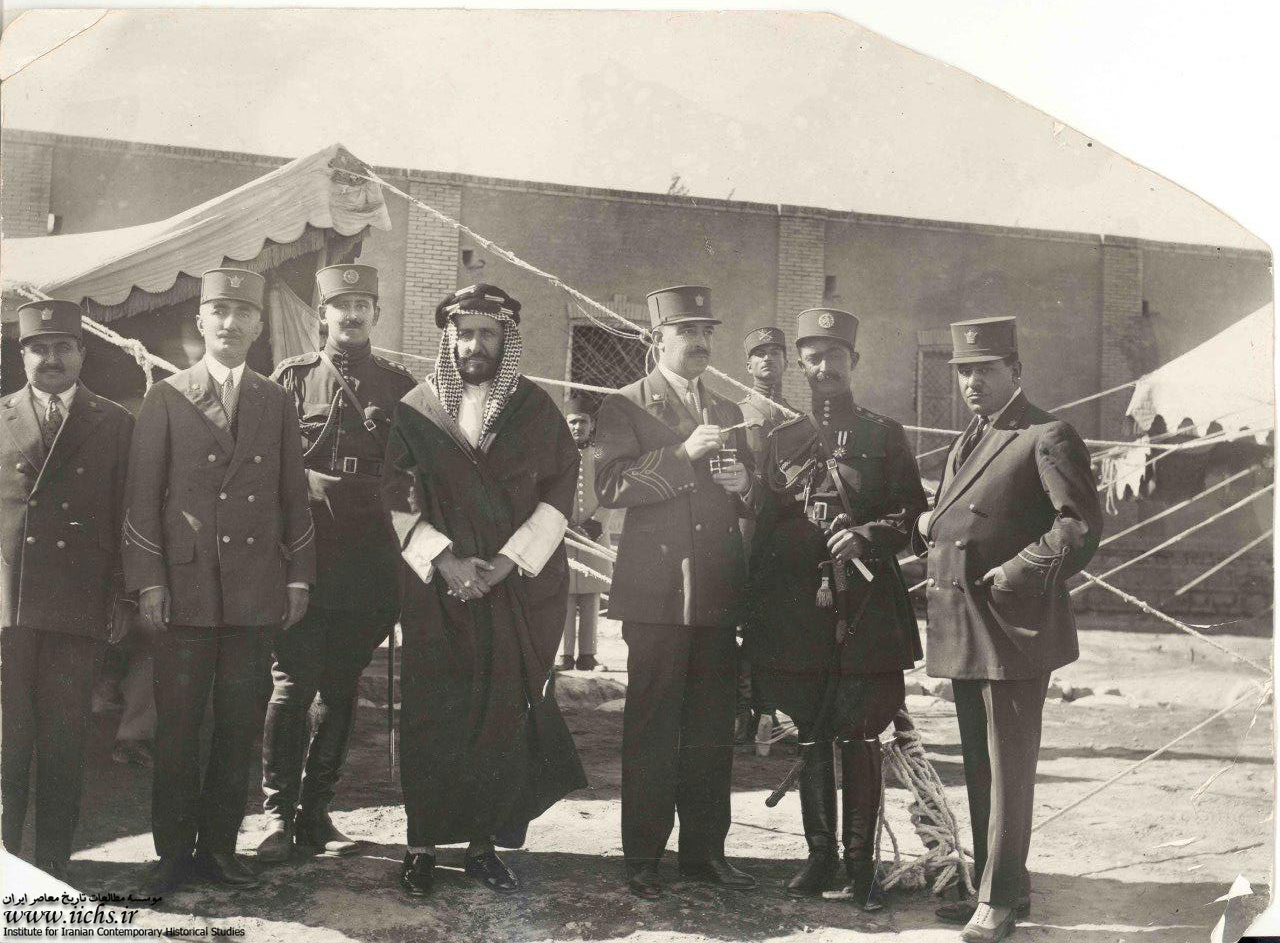
Shaikh Khaz'al in captivity of the Persian military forces after being kidnapped from his yacht, 1925

Sheikh Khaz’al, the influential Emir of Mohammerah, was kidnapped and exiled to Tehran following the 1921 Persian coup and under the consent of Britain. After years of being held under strict surveillance by Reza Shah's regime, Sheikh Khaz’al was eventually murdered by police officers on the orders of Reza Shah. Although the circumstances of his death were suspected from the start, it wasn't until after Reza Shah's exile that the details of his murder were officially documented. Sheikh Khaz’al’s death was tied to a broader pattern of political repression during Reza Shah's rule, which sought to centralize power in Persia.

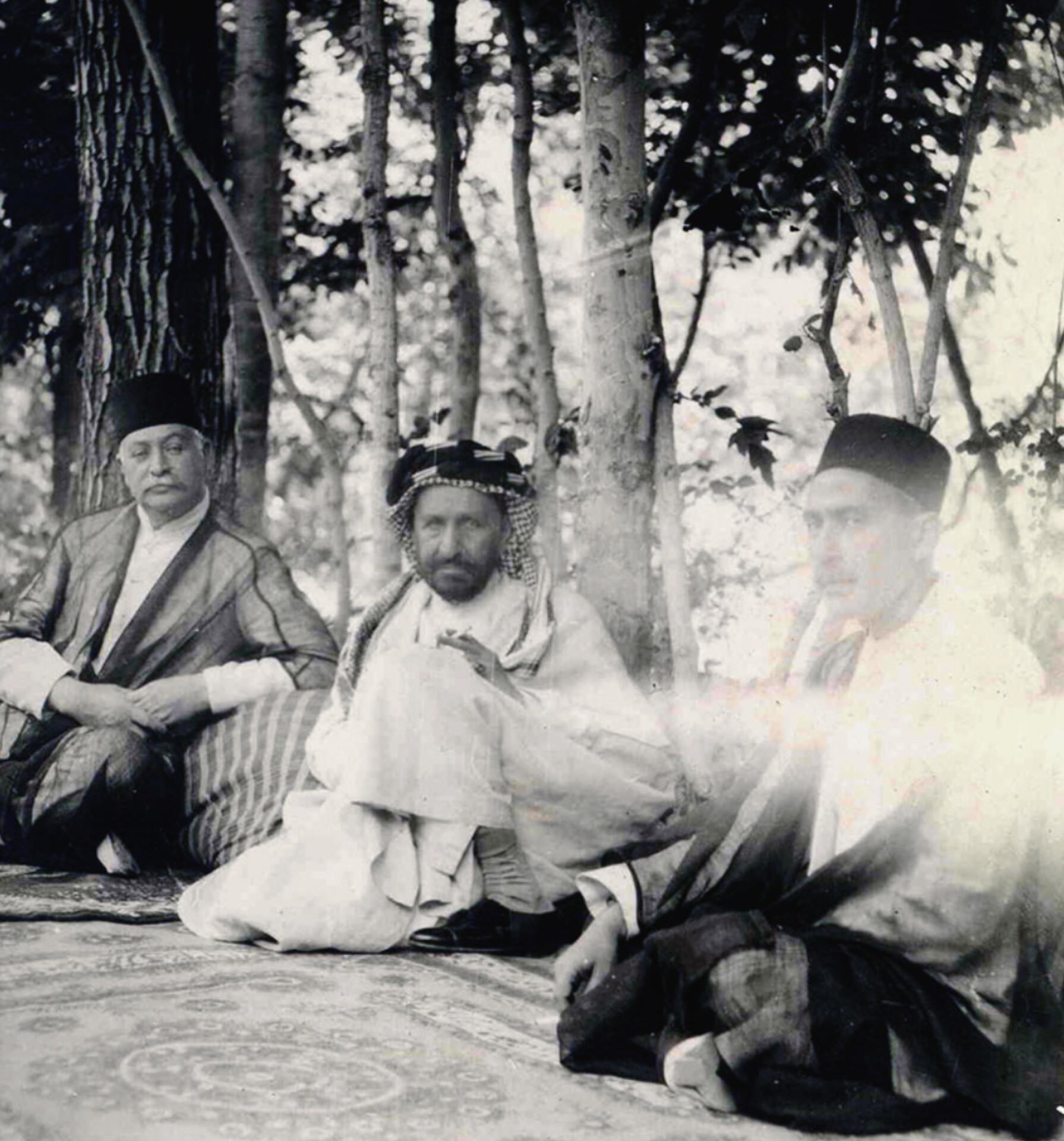
Shaikh Khazal during his exile and house arrest in Tehran.

Abbas Bakhtiari, known as "Six-Fingered," played a central role in the murder, collaborating with other police officers under the direct command of Reza Shah's security apparatus. Bakhtiari's confession during the trial detailed the brutal murder of Sheikh Khaz’al, where the victim was strangled, and his body was subsequently disposed of. Bakhtiari and several others involved in the crime were detained and interrogated, leading to confessions that implicated them in the political assassination. The trial of the perpetrators revealed the deep involvement of various members of Reza Shah's police force, including high-ranking officers like Rokneddin Mokhtari.

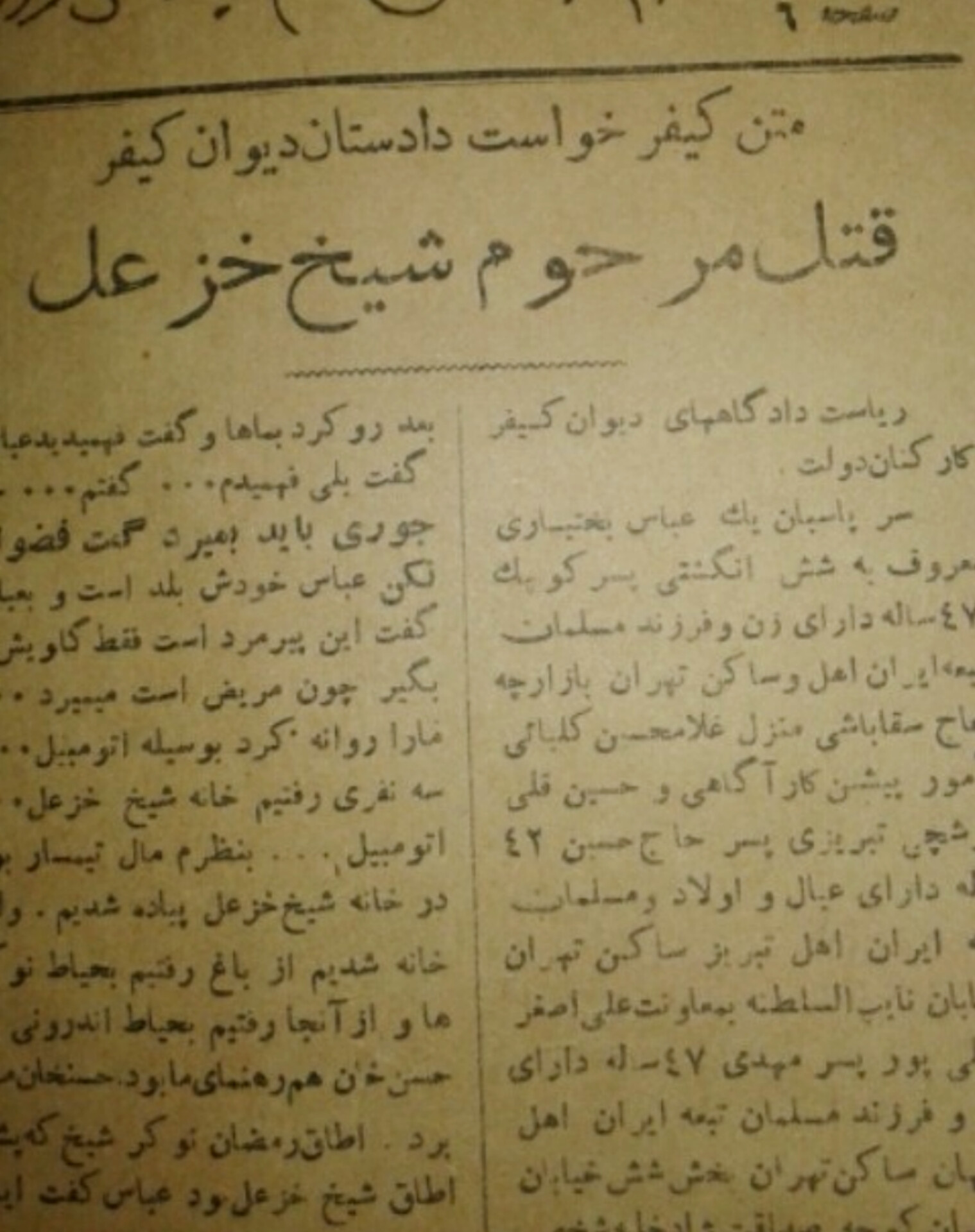
The Setareh newspaper's coverage of the indictment issued by the Prosecutor of the Iranian Criminal Court in the trial of Sheikh Khazal's murderers the title reads "The murder of Shaikh Khaz'al"

After Reza Shah's exile, the individuals involved in the murder of Sheikh Khaz’al were tried and sentenced for their roles in the assassination. Abbas Bakhtiari received a ten-year sentence, while other officers involved were also sentenced to hard labor. Mokhtari, the chief of police, received a sentence but was later granted a royal pardon by Mohammad Reza Pahlavi. Sheikh Khaz’al's body was not allowed to be moved for burial until 1955, when his family, after years of struggle, was permitted to transfer his remains to Najaf, where he was finally laid to rest beside his family.

== See also ==
- House of Sabah
- Politics of Khuzestan province
- History of Khuzestan province
