= Mkrtich Khan Davidkhanian =

Iranian military officer and politician (1902–1983)

Governor of Khorramshahr
- Monarch: Reza Shah

Military Governor of Dezful
- Monarch: Mohammad Reza Pahlavi

Personal details
- Born: 1902 Isfahan, Sublime State of Persia
- Died: 1983 (aged 80–81) Dezful, Iran
- Relations: See Davidkhanian family
- Parent: Sarkis Khan Davidkhanian (father)
- Awards: Order of Sepah

Military service
- Allegiance: (Qajar Iran) Sublime State of Persia (1919–1925); First Republic of Armenia (1920) (Pahlavi Iran) Imperial State of Iran (1925–1979); Iran (1979–1983)
- Years of service: 1919–1983
- Rank: Brigadier general
- Battles/wars: Turkish War of Independence; Turkish–Armenian War; Sheikh Khazal rebellion; Simko Shikak revolt (1926); Second World War; Anglo-Soviet invasion of Iran; Iran–Iraq War; Operation Nasr

Mkrtich Khan Davidkhanian (Note: Sometimes transliterated as Meguertitch Khan Davidkhanian) (Persian: مگردیچ خان داویدخانیان, Armenian: Մկրտիչ խան Դավիթխանյան, 1902–1983) was an Iranian military officer and politician. A member of the Davidkhanian family in Iran, he was a prominent military figure in Pahlavi-era Iran, serving as governor of Khorramshahr and Dezful under the rule of Reza Shah and Mohammad Reza Pahlavi, respectively.

== Early life ==
Mkrtich Khan Davidkhanian was born in Isfahan in 1902. An Iranian Armenian, he was the son of Sarkis Khan Davidkhanian, a senior military officer in Qajar-era Iran.

== Career ==
Davidkhanian first fought in the Turkish-Armenian War as a volunteer for the First Republic of Armenia. He also participated in several other subsequent wars as a soldier in the Iranian military, and played a critical and leading role in the overthrow of Sheikh Khazal.

In January 1925, after Sheikh Kazal had failed to receive support in his separatist uprising from the Bakhtiari, Lur and Khamseh tribes, and the approval Qajar dynasty and the British government, Reza Shah ordered one of his commanders, who knew Khazal well, to meet him and convince him to journey to Tehran.

The commander, General Fazlollah Zahedi, accompanied by several government officials, met with Khazal and spent an evening with him on board his yacht, anchored in the Shatt al-Arab river by his palace in the village of Fallahiyah near the city of Mohammerah. That very evening, Reza Shah sent a gunboat of fifty troops, led by Davidkhanian, to board the yacht. Meguertitch and his men arrested Khazal and took him by motorboat down the river to Mohammerah, where a car was waiting to take him to the military base in Ahvaz. This marked the end of the rebellion. Davidkhanian was awarded the Order of Sepah by Reza Khan for his role in quelling the revolt.

Meugertitch Khan Davidkhanian served as the governor of Khorramshahr in 1927, and was appointed the military governor of Dezful during the Iran–Iraq War, by Ruhollah Khomeini, serving as the local commander during Operation Nasr until his death in 1983.

== Personal life ==
A member of the Davidkhanian family, Mkrtich's father was General Sarkis Khan Davidkhanian. He is related to Markar Davidkhanian, the former Minister of Finance of Iran, and Martiros Khan Davidkhanian, the former Chief of Staff of the Persian Cossack Brigade, among others.
