= Hassaan Al-Gazaar Al-Chinani =

Ahwazi musician

Hassaan Al-Gazaar Chinani
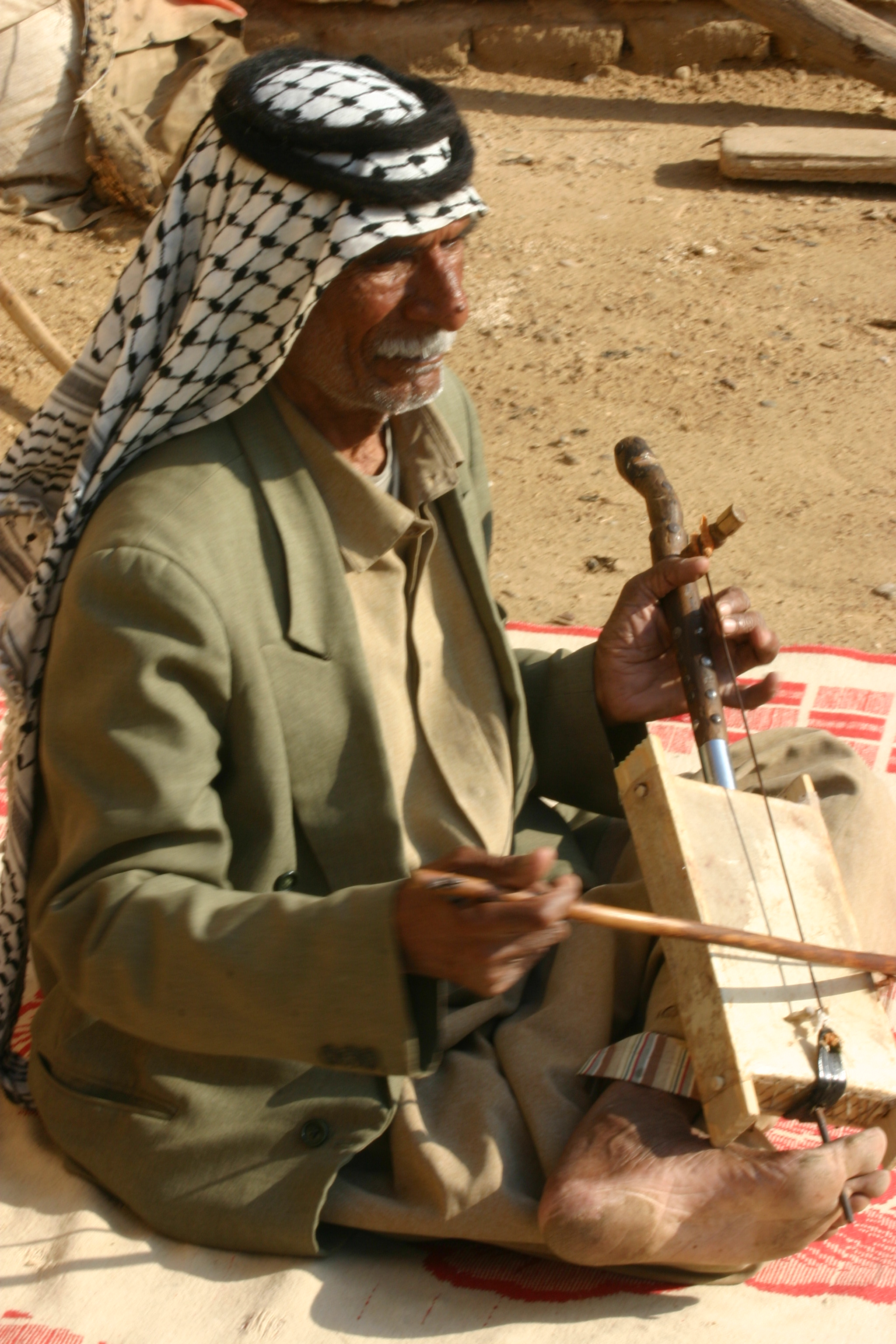

Background information
- Birth name: Hassaan Al-Gazaar Chinani
- Origin: Ahvaz, Iran
- Died: 2010
- Genres: Alwaniyah, Arabic folk
- Occupation(s): Singer, Songwriter, Composer, Instrumentalist

Hassaan Al-Gazaar Chenani (Arabic: حسان الگزار الكناني), is an instrumentalist of "Rababa", who is known as "Hassaan Al-Gazaar", was an Arabic singer of from Iran. He was a resident of Khuwayis, a village in Khuzestan province. Chenani was discovered and introduced to music society of Iran by Hooshangjavid, a music researcher of areas of Iran.

== Expertise and reputation ==
Chenani was reputed mostly because of his expertise in vocal music and playing with his handmade Rababa instrument, that was made up of just a wire and was a simple instrument. Al-Gazaar was recognized and took into the consideration of many elite musicians of Iran, in Twenty-Fifth Annual Music "Fajr" Festival.

Following his death, the Iranian media introduced him as epic singer of "Khuzestan". In addition to Alwaniyah style, he was completely a professional in many different styles, like "Hulaylawi", "Shatrawi", "Muhammadawi", "Magsusi", "Chowbiyah" etc... . It is said that "Hassaan Al-Gazaar Chenani" was the supreme players of "Rababa", who had an important role in keeping the Alwaniyah tune alive. Of course Hassaan Al-Gazaar, believed that this tune did not belong to Alwan, but belongs to an Arab tribe, by the name of "Amoori" in Ahwaz, and he (Alwan) kept this tune alive.

== His life ==
He lived in the Khuwayis village until the end of his life. Hassaan turned to singing and musicianship from the age of 12. He performed music in the praise of the prophet of Islam. The art of versification was hereditary in his family. His grandfather was nicknamed "Jabbar-Al-Adib", because of his poetry talent, his father "Salman" was a dexterous poet and singer. Al-Gazaar learned the art of crafting the "Rababa" and singing from his father.

It is quoted from Hassaan, that when he traveled to Baghdad, to visit his brothers there, his trip had coincided with the anniversary of the crowning of King Faisal in Iraq, he took part in the ceremony, which was attended by the most famous Arab singers, to show his art. In this event, the organizers, gave him a car, but he gave it to his brothers in Iraq, and on his horseback he returned to Sus. He said due to the interest in his native land, he returned. Also in the Sixth Iranian Regional Music Festival, he was honored and celebrated by twenty-seven singers and nine outstanding instrumentalists of different regions of Iran.

== End of his life ==
Two days after his artistically implementation in the Twenty-Fifth Annual Music Fajr Festival, on the way of return to his birthplace, Hassaan Al-Gazaar Chenani, died, because of heart failure.

At March 9's Saturday evening, Al-Gazaar, played the last song of his life, at the art academy of Tehran, in Twenty-Fifth Annual Music Fajr Festival. Deputy of artistic affairs, of Minister of Culture and Islamic Guidance of the time, in a message, send his condolences to the death of this musical artist. Also the Secretary of the Twenty-Fifth International Music Fajr Festival, In a separate message sent his condolences to the people of "Khuzestan".

The instrument that Al-Gazaar was using, was his handmade Rababa, that was made up by a single hair from a horse tail. Al-Gazaar performed his latest songs in Sunday (February 28, 2010) after the performance of Ehsan Khajehamiri, Rumi and Gholam Margiri group, Gholamreza Alme Jooghi in Tehran Art Academy. At the closing ceremony of the Twenty-Fifth Fajr Music Festival, After a speech by Minister of Culture of the time, there was a reminding for departed members of music community of Iran, in the year 2010, by playing a clip of Hassaan Al-Gazaar, Andre Arezoomanian, Gholamreza Hamzei, Reza Saghaee, Mohammad Noori, Farid Salmanian, Elin Baghcheban, Gholam-Ali Naizar, Ali Abchoori, Mohammad-Hassan Tafakori, Saeed Gholipoor and Hossein Fotoohi.

The message of passing the way of Hassaan Al-Gazaar, published in newspapers and national radios of Iran.
