= Operation Nasr =

1981 tank battle of the Iran–Iraq War

Coordinates: 32.3833°N 48.4667°E

- Part of Iran–Iraq War
Date	January 5–9, 1981
Location	Dezful, southwest Iran
Result	Iraqi victory: Iranian counter-attack fails.; Iraqis maintain the siege of Abadan, Ahvaz, Andimeshk, Dezful, Shush, Susangerd as well as continuing to besiege the nearby Air Force Base named Vahdati—all were receiving artillery fire and were hit by Frog-7 missiles

Belligerents
Iraq	Iran

Commanders and leaders
(Ba'athist Iraq) Colonel Mahmoud Shukr Shahin	(Iran) Abolhassan Banisadr (Iran) Meguertitch Khan Davidkhanian

Strength
65,000-80,000 troops, three armored brigades from the 6th and 9th Armored divisions (T-62s) as well as T-72 tanks from the 10th independent armored brigade 350 tanks in total	~100.000 troops, three armored brigades from the 16th and 92nd Armored divisions (M60s and Chieftain tanks); 330 tanks in total

Casualties and losses
45 tanks destroyed Some APCs/IFVs destroyed 3 helicopters downed 15 rocket artillery pieces destroyed 44 killed (Iraqi claim)	214 tanks destroyed/captured 150 APCs/IFVs destroyed/captured Some self-propelled artillery destroyed 8 AH-1J Cobras downed Several fighter-bombers downed 141–300 killed (Iranian claim); Heavy casualties (Iraqi claim)

Operation Nasr, also known as Operation Hoveyzeh, was a major battle in the Iran–Iraq War fought in early January 1981. It was the biggest tank battle of the war.

Three Iranian armored regiments advanced towards Iraqi forces that had invaded Iranian territory between the cities of Ahvaz, Susangerd and Dezful. The Iraqi forces were alerted to this movement and feigned a withdrawal. The Iraqis formed three armored brigades into a three-sided box ambush. The Iranians blundered into the ambush and the two tank forces battled for four days in a sea of mud. The Iranians withdrew, leaving many destroyed and disabled tanks stuck in the mud, or, because of logistical misplanning, had run out of fuel and ammunition. The condition of the terrain prevented a clean break from the battle and did not allow the Iraqi forces to pursue what was left of the Iranians en force.

== Prelude ==
On 22 September 1980, Iraqi military forces under the command of Saddam Hussein invaded Iran. Iran, which had been weakened drastically by revolution, were caught off-guard. However, their air force (itself weakened by sanctions and purges) managed to hit numerous Iraqi military and industrial targets, damaging the Iraqi military and economy. Iraq's invasion slowed drastically, and they became bogged down fighting Iranian paramilitary forces in urban actions such as the First Battle of Khorramshahr. By November, the Iraqi invasion force had ground to a halt, and Iran's air force had largely defeated its Iraqi counterpart. Iraq's navy also suffered destruction (Operation Morvarid). Nevertheless, Iran lacked the strength to drive the Iraqis out immediately. Being under American sanctions, the Iranians could not get spare parts for much of their military equipment and had to use it sparingly. While Iranian paramilitaries and irregulars had slowed the Iraqi drive, it took over three months for Iran to deploy its military to the region.

After the Islamic Revolution in 1979, the regular army and air force had suffered due to purges and lack of supplies and spare parts from their former Western allies, especially the US and UK, and was no longer the fifth most powerful military in the world. Meanwhile, a new force, the Islamic Revolutionary Guard Corps (Sepah-e-Pasdaran) gained prominence. Meanwhile, the conflict between the Pasdaran and the Army entered a new phase after the war began in 1980. A power struggle began within the new government in Tehran between President Abolhassan Banisadr and the opposition Islamic Republic Party (IRP), led by Prime Minister Mohammad-Ali Rajai. Banisadr began to support the regular army, while IRP supported the Pasdaran. This severely impeded military operations, and caused a complete lack of coordination. As a result, Iran was virtually unable to launch any major offensives other than the air offensive. Both armies conducted their operations separately and in a thoroughly uncoordinated fashion, while the Pasdaran carried out much of the combat and getting much recognition. It also led to an erosion of Banisadr's revolutionary credentials, as he was increasingly identified as defending and being part of a perceived secular, shah-era entity.

== Planning ==
With declining support, President Banisadr convinced Supreme Leader Ayatollah Khomeini in Tehran (who had the final say in all state matters) to allow him to take personal command of the regular army. After Banisadr took personal command and arrived at the front, he began planning a major offensive against the Iraqis, codenamed "Operation Nasr" (Victory). The attack was to be carried out entirely by the regular army, and if successful would boost Banisadr's standing in the still chaotic Iranian political landscape, in addition to trumping the Pasdaran and their supporters.

The operation was planned to be an armored offensive in Khuzestan province (the main province that Iraq attacked). It was designed to relieve the city of Abadan, which was under what would be a nearly year-long siege. It would be preceded by diversionary attacks at Qasr-e-Shirin and Mehran near the central part of the border with Iraq. The main attack would be carried out by three armored brigades of the 92nd Ahvaz and 16th Qazvin armored division and the 55th paratrooper brigade of the regular army. The armored thrust would cross the Karkheh River drive from the northeast part of the province past the cities of Susangerd and Ahvaz, down the west bank of the Karun River. At the same time, forces inside Abadan would break out of their positions, and link up with the armored column arriving from the north. The plan depended on total surprise being achieved. Iran's armored forces assembled for the attack were larger than their opponents (consisting of an armored brigade), and on paper the plan appeared to be practicable.

Despite his title as president, Banisadr was not a military leader. While the flaws of this plan were not apparent to him, they would create serious problems during his campaign. Firstly, Iran's army having suffered disastrously during the revolution from purges and sanctions was simply unable to carry out proper combined arms operations. All of the senior generals and entire swathes of the officer cadre from the Shah's era had been lost to purges (either executed, imprisoned, or fled abroad), and the remaining ones were not as well trained, and/or all too happy to embark on an operation to restore their credibility to the eyes of the regime. Iran's armored forces were not skilled in carrying out armored maneuvers even prior to the revolution, and those problems were amplified after the revolution.

To make matters worse, much of the regular army infantry forces had been disbanded after the revolution, and there was little time to recall them. Thus the bulk of the tank's infantry support should have been the Pasdaran. But since Banisadr was excluding them from this operation, Iran's tanks would have less vital infantry support. Without the Pasdaran supporting as infantry, the Iranians were to use their 55th paratrooper brigade from the regular army as infantry support. Even worse, the Iranians did not have sufficient helicopters, artillery, and ammunition to support their advance. The Iranians would use 300 tanks (M-60 Pattons and Chieftains), but did not have the 3:1 superiority necessary to guarantee a breakthrough (and possibly lacked even a 2:1 superiority). Iran also lacked proper reconnaissance. While Banisadr had tried to alleviate some of the problems, and somewhat restored the Iranian army's command structure, it was simply not ready to carry out a major offensive.

The attack had been planned for an unsuitable location, which complicated the matter even further. The terrain around Susangerd was muddy and prone to seasonal flooding and rain turned the ground into a quagmire, the area was in many ways unsuitable for proper armored maneuver. The Iranians would have to attack slowly in a straight column on surface roads, with the infantry support at the tail end of the column. That meant the tanks would be moving forward unprotected, and with their flanks exposed. Worse, this movement would be easily detected by Iraqi helicopters. The distance the Iranian forces had to penetrate was also extremely lengthy, and it was easy for the Iraqis to counterattack and reinforce their troops, running counter to Iran's plan of achieving surprise.

== Diversionary attacks ==
Iran launched three diversionary attacks prior to Operation Nasr. The first one began on January 4–6, near Qasr-e-Shirin in central part of the border with Iraq. A brigade of regular Iranian mountain troops attacked Iraqi forces that were in a defensive position, blocking the main highway between Tehran and Baghdad. In a pattern which would become all too familiar later during the war, the Iranians infiltrated through the Iraqi positions, and even captured some enemy units. But the battle broke down into a fight for each hill and mountain peak, and the Iraqis rushed reinforcements. While Iran gained 8 kilometers, they did not achieve any significant tactical advantage.

The second attack involved other Iranian mountain troops infiltrating towards occupied Mehran in a failed effort to liberate the town. The end result was similar to the previous battle.

The third attack was more serious. It involved an Iranian mechanized division attacking Iraqi forces west of the Karun River in the vicinity of Ahvaz. The goal of the battle was to drive the Iraqis out of artillery range of the city. The terrain was more suitable for vehicles, and the road network was good. They achieved surprise, and drove the Iraqis back several miles, however the Iraqis remained within artillery range of the city and the Iranians took moderate to heavy losses.

== Main attack ==
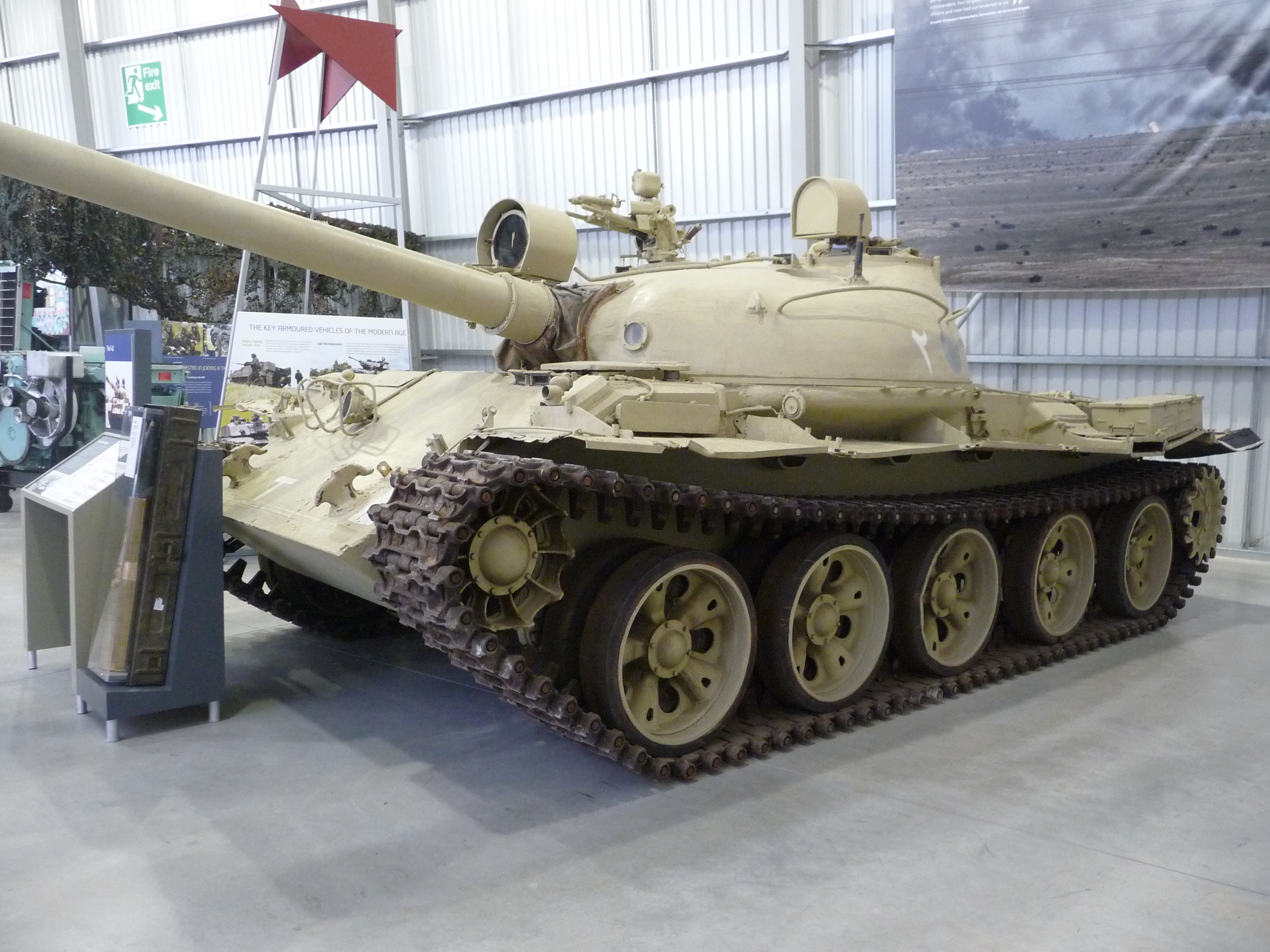
Iraqi T-62

The main attack began on 5 January. The attack began with a short artillery bombardment. The Iranian forces, using pontoon bridges, crossed the Karkheh River. The Iranians used 300 tanks. Due to the muddy terrain, they were confined to the paved road. Because of that, the Iranians assembled their forces in a long row of columns. The first three columns consisted of armored brigades, and the final column was the infantry support. The infantry was thus behind the tanks, and the entire flank of this long row of column was completely exposed.

The Iranian forces began to move down the paved road which ran between Ahvaz and Susangerd. They moved very slowly, and each column moved separately. Unknown to the Iranians, their plans had already begun to go awry when Iraqi observation aircraft spotted the column moving west towards Susangerd. Thus their plans for surprise had been foiled. The Iraqis immediately began planning their action. The Iraqis moved their 10th Armored Brigade, and positioned them on the Iranian line of advance on the road. The Iraqis dug their tanks into a hull-down position, meaning they were dug into the mud and used as static pieces. While the Iraqis often lacked the skill to maneuver, and regularly put their tanks in dug-in positions gaining the advantage of a smaller/lower silhouette, in this instance it would prove to be successful, because the extremely muddy conditions would hamper armored maneuver. The Iraqi Soviet T-62s and T-72s were dug into positions both in front of and on the side of the Iranian line of advance. The Iraqis were also supported by attack helicopters such as Mi-8s, Alouette IIIs, and Sa-341/342 Gazelles. Thus the Iraqi trap was set.

On 6 January, the next day, Iranian forces came into contact with the Iraqi armor. Iran's shortage of reconnaissance proved to be disastrous as they failed to see the approaching trap. The Iraqis began firing at the Iranian tanks from the front and both sides. The Iranians tried to drive through the Iraqi forces in an armored spearhead, but took heavy losses. They then tried to maneuver. But that involved driving their tanks off the paved road, and into the mud. Iranian tanks then got stuck in the mud. The first Iranian brigade was decimated, and many tanks were destroyed or abandoned in the mud. Nevertheless, the Iranians refused to abort the attack, and their next brigade moved into action.

The second Iranian brigade advanced, and the results were similar. Iranian helicopters (AH-1J SeaCobras) also joined the battle, destroyed several dug-in Iraqi tanks, but their efforts were not enough to alleviate the pressure on the Iranian ground force and the Iranian armor kept taking heavy losses. The Iraqis also had anti-aircraft weapons, and several Iranian helicopters were shot down. To make matters worse, Iraqi mechanized infantry with anti-tank weapons joined in, turning the battle into a slaughter for the Iranians. Fighting took place at close range and was brutal. Just when things were going badly, Iraqi aircraft also bombed the pontoon bridge across the Kharkeh River, trapping the Iranian tanks and preventing their retreat. Iran's infantry was also stuck on the opposite bank (they hadn't moved into action yet) and separated from joining the battle. Iranian helicopters attempted to fight back, but they were attacked by Iraqi fighter jets, which destroyed or damaged several helicopters.

By 8 January, the entire Iranian attack was in chaos. Many tanks from the first two brigades had been lost, either destroyed, or stuck in the mud and abandoned. The third Iranian brigade attempted to continue the attack, but could make little headway. Instead, Operation Nasr was aborted, and the Iranians moved to retreat. The infantry force (which never had a chance to join the battle) instead moved into a defensive position to prevent an Iraqi counterattack. Iranian engineers at the last second managed to rebuild the pontoon bridges over the Karkheh river, and the third Iranian tank brigade managed to break away from the combat and retreat from the Iraqi forces and move back across the Karkheh River.

Meanwhile, during the débâcle at Susangerd, Iranian infantry forces at besieged Abadan attempted their breakout, in order to link up with the armored column. Even if the 16th and 92nd armored divisions had not been defeated in battle, it was unlikely that they would have been able to reach them. The Iranian infantry took heavy losses and were forced to retreat back to Abadan.

== Aftermath ==
The Iraqis had easily defeated the Iranians. While the Iranians had been a powerful force prior to the revolution, the damage inflicted by the revolution had made it possible for the Iraqis to gain a victory like this. Nevertheless, a centralized and inflexible Iraqi command and lack of foresight resulted in a failure to capitalize on their victory, which saved the Iranians from a total rout. The Iraqis primarily dug in their tanks into the ground to act as static artillery, and while that worked at the fighting around Dezful and Susangerd, it meant that they were unable to follow up their victory and destroy the Iranians. Instead, they remained dug in as the Iranians withdrew. A minor Iraqi counterattack with helicopters and some armor was beaten back by Iranian forces near the town of Shush which lay just behind the Karkheh river on the line of advance to Dezful.

For the Iranian military, this major defeat had serious implications. Iran had lost 214 tanks, at least 150 other armored vehicles, some heavy artillery and a large portion of the 16th and 92nd armored divisions. Many armored vehicles had been captured intact as they had been abandoned or stuck in the mud, and were put on display in Iraq (some were later even sold to Jordan, while others remained in storage until the 2003 invasion). The loss would have been absolutely complete had the Iranians not managed to re-assemble their pontoon bridge. Prior to the revolution, Iran had had 1,700 tanks (which dwindled to 1,000 usable ones after the revolution). With their defeat at Susangerd, approximately 17% of that entire force was destroyed, a major weakening of Iranian military power. To make matters worse, with US-led sanctions on Iran, those tanks could not be replaced while the Iraqi ones could easily be (since they weren't under an embargo and had the support of the west).

Despite their decisive victory, 45 Iraqi tanks and some other armored vehicles were destroyed. Since they fought from static positions, they were easier targets for attack helicopters. Nevertheless, their losses could be replaced, while the Iranians' could not.

The defeat at Susangerd had major political implications in Iran. President Banisadr had been expecting that a major victory would help increase his political standing and help silence his ever-critical opponents. Instead, exactly the opposite happened. His approval rating dropped drastically, and his opponents attacked him even more fiercely. Worse, the army, which he supported, was now discredited even further. By June 1981, things had gotten so bad for Banisadr that Iran's Parliament led by the IRP and Prime Minister Rajai impeached him. Ayatollah Khomeini, who had played the role of a "neutral arbiter" and had through the past year had sought to settle the differences between Banisadr and his opponents, finally gave up on him, and approved his impeachment. Banisadr fled the country in disguise with a defecting air force pilot to avoid arrest. Banisadr was replaced by an unofficial junta, led by the now President Rajaii, the new Prime Minister Javad Bahonar, and the Speaker of Parliament Ali Akbar Hashemi Rafsanjani. Iran became a one-party state led by the IRP for the duration of the war.

The impeachment of Banisadr began a several month period of near civil war and terror in Iran. At least several hundred government officials were killed in assassinations and bombings (which killed Rajai and Bahonar, and nearly Rafsanjani). The Iranian regime unleashed their own wave of terror, torturing and executing over 3,000 members of the opposition, and purging the regular army once again. They eventually suppressed most of their opponents (including dissident clerics).

By September, the political situation was improving and with the government under the control of the hard-liners of the IRP, Iran's military effectiveness drastically improved. The hardliners were willing to benefit from the army, and with no power struggle, Iran was able to fight effectively again. Both as a result of heavy equipment losses, and a decline in confidence, the Iranian army with their regular tactics were not seen as important. Instead, the Pasdaran infantry with their unconventional tactics became even more prominent. Nevertheless, the army and Pasdaran would be able to display a unity that would help them drive the Iraqis out of Iran, with the Pasdaran launching infantry attacks, and the regular army using their tanks and artillery to support them.

== Bibliography ==
- V. Phase Two: Iran Liberates Its Territory 1981-1982
- Woods, K.M. Saddam's War: An Iraqi Military Perspective of the Iran-Iraq War. Smashbooks. p. 50.
- The Christian Science Monitor (20 January 1981). "Iran-Iraq war bogs down in rain, conflicting claims". The Christian Science Monitor. p. 2.
