= Emirate of Muhammara =

Autonomous emirate from 1812 to 1925

Emirate of Muhammara امارة المحمرة
- 1812–1925
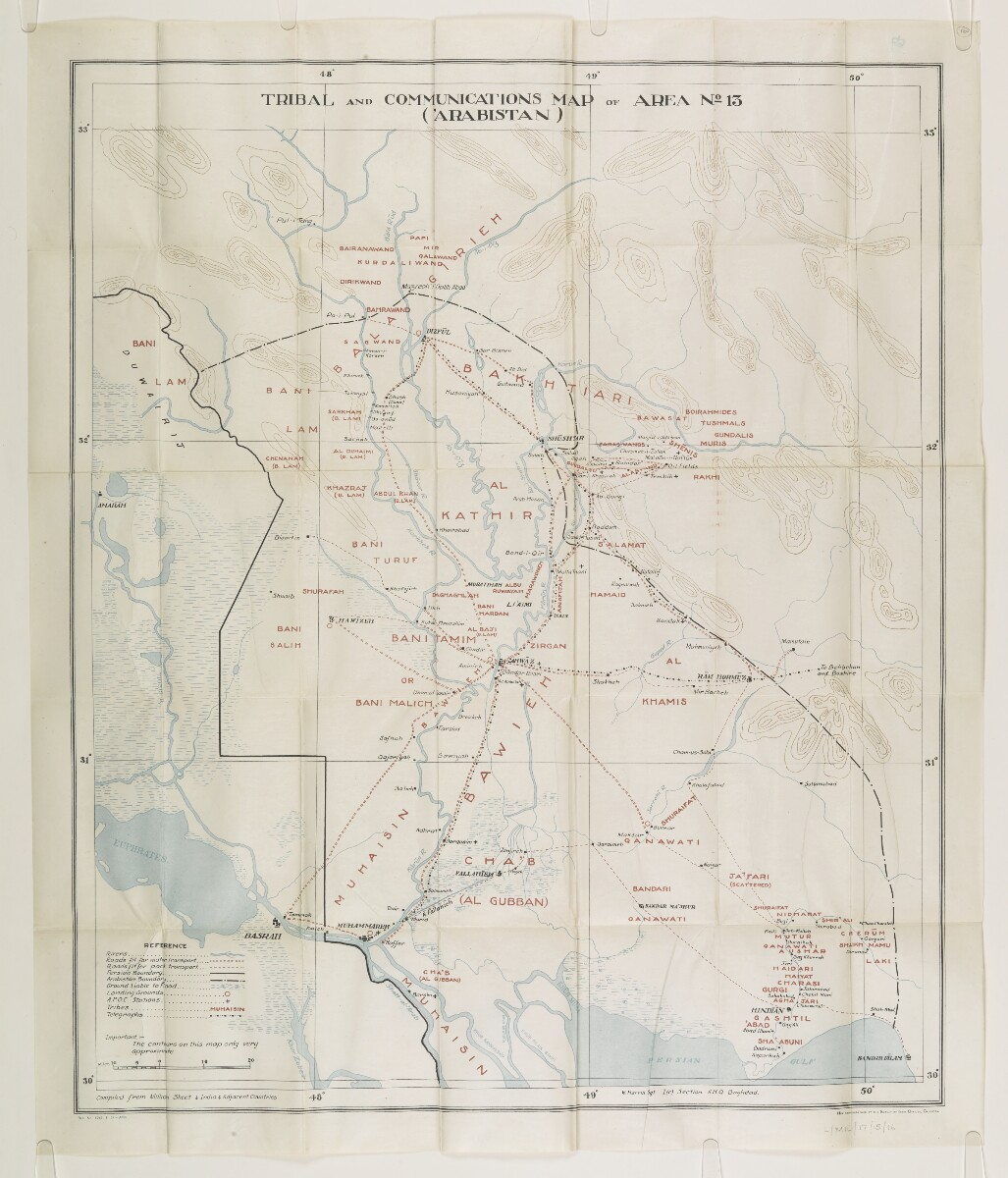
- Map of Arabistan in 1924, showing major tribes and roads
- Status: Autonomous Emirate
- Capital: Al-Muhammarah
- Common languages: Arabic
- Religion: Islam
- History
  - Established: 1812
  - Discovery of Oil: 1908
  - Sheikh Khazal rebellion: 1925
Preceded by	Succeeded by
Banu Ka'b; Musha'sha'	Pahlavi Iran
- Today part of: Iran

The Emirate of Muhammara, also known as the Sheikhdom of Muhammara (sometimes also called the Emirate of Arabistan or Sheikhdom of Arabistan), was an autonomous emirate in modern-day Khuzestan province in Iran during the late 19th and early 20th centuries, lasting until the then ruler of Iran, Reza Shah, re-established full control over the region in 1925. Officially it was part of Qajar Iran, but the broader Khuzestan region had already enjoyed a large degree of autonomy under the previous rule of the Banu Ka'b (1740–1840), under whom it had become thoroughly Arabized (whence the name Arabistan).

In the 1840s, the ruling sheikh of the Banu Ka'b became a vasal of Jabir al-Ka'bi (1780–1881), in his capacity as the sheikh of Muhammara (Khorramshahr), a port city in southern Khuzestan which had risen to prominence in the previous decade. After the Anglo-Persian War, Sheikh Jabir grew completely independent of the Ka'b, though as a member of the Ka'b tribe himself, he did claim the title "Sheikh of the Ka'b". Under Jabir's successors Miz'al ibn Jabir (r. 1881–1897) and Khaz'al ibn Jabir (r. 1897–1924), the power of the Sheikhs of Muhammara grew to such an extent so as to become the most significant power in the southern Khuzestan, notably also receiving some British colonial support.

Ruling from Muhammara as his capital, Sheikh Khaz'al turned to Arab nationalism, and emboldened particularly by the British discovery of oil in the region in 1908, he sought to gain full independence from Iran. He staged revolts in 1916 and 1924, the latter of which (called the Sheikh Khaz'al rebellion) led to the final subjugation of the emirate by Iran in November 1924 – January 1925, which became a part of the modern Khuzestan province in 1936. Following the downfall of Sheikh Khaz'al's rule in Arabistan, many Iranian Arabs fled to neighboring countries such as (southern) Iraq and Kuwait, as well as to Bahrain and to the al-Ahsa' Governorate in Saudi Arabia, thus also introducing a significant Shi'i population into these countries.

The semi-autonomous rule of Arab sheikhs over Khuzestan during this period is regarded by Arab nationalists as an abortive attempt at Arab independence, while Iranian historians tend to treat it as part of the long-standing British attempts to control the region.

== Geography ==
The majority of Khuzestan province (Arabistan), with the exception of the Bakhtiari lands, fell within the geographical range of Mesopotamia while bordering the Zagros mountains to the East.

== History ==
Khuzestan province (Arabistan), a tract isolated by mountains, rivers and marsh from Mesopotamia to the Zagros mountains, had maintained a semi-independent position during the post-Safavid period, free from any but sporadic interference from the ottomans and Persians.

=== 15th-18th century ===
The Banu Ka’b rulers of Arabistan had carved out an independent existence since the late seventeenth century by playing the Persians against the Ottomans. Because of Qajar weakness, the Arab tribes in Khuzestan province retained a large measure of autonomy. Until the early seventeenth century, the area east of the Shatt al-Arab was an Arab emirate ruled by Sheikh Mubarak bin Abdul Muttalib. He ruled his emirate independently of both the Persian and Ottoman Empires. A later ruler, Sheikh Mansour, resisted Shah Abbas's attempts to interfere in his affairs. He also rejected the Shah’ s call to join the Persian forces besieging Baghdad in 1623.

=== 18th-19th century: The rule of the Al Bu Nasir, Princes of Fallahiyah ===
By the eighteenth century, the Bani Ka'b had constructed one of the Persian Gulf's largest seagoing fleets. Different accounts indicate that during this period of transition, the Ka’b recognized Ottoman sovereignty, and that it was only after their post 1720 expansion into Arabistan that the question of their allegiance came to the fore. This was when Nader Shah (1732–47 ) dispatched Muhammad Husayn Qajar to besiege Quban and the Ka'b sued for peace thereby accepting Persian suzerainty for the first time.

==== The reign of Sheikh Salman ====
Thanks to a favorable location and the activities of this fleet, the economy on both sides of the Shatt flourished, and Ka‘b rulers were able to incorporate the Persian lands along the Karun as well as the nominally Ottoman districts of Muhammarah, Haffar, and Tamar, while retaining a degree of autonomy from both the Ottomans and the Persians.

In 1763, the Ottoman authorities, in co-operation with the British, sought to weaken the Bani Ka’ b tribes and a joint Anglo-Ottoman campaign marched on Arabistan. This culminated in victory for the Arab tribes. Two years later, Persia launched a violent and destructive military campaign that led the Arab inhabitants of Arabistan to abandon their capital in Qabban and seek refuge in the village of Al-Fallahiyya. Because of this, Arabistan became fragmented and it divided into scattered tribal groups, the most prominent of which was the Al-Muhaysin. In due course, the capital of Arabistan moved again from the village of Al-Fallahiyya to the city of Al-Muhammara, which had been built by the Bani Ka’ b Arabs near the mouth of the river Karun on the Shatt Al-Arab, and continued to be Arabistan’ s capital until 1925. Al Muhammara was given its name because its soil was red.

=== 19th-20th century: The rule of the Al Bu Kasib, Princes of Mohammerah ===
Since the emergence of Mohammerah in 1812 as an autonomous emirate in Arabistan, it had been a bone of contention between the Persian and Ottoman Empires. The Emirate's strategic and commercial location in the Shatt al Arab accentuated Persian-Ottoman rivalry for control over it. Muhammarah subsequently became a hostage to the two states, until the 1847 Erzurum Treaty allotted it to Persia. Despite the treaty, the emirate continued to be an autonomous entity, and the flow of Arab tribes across the Shatt al Arab preserved the Arab identity of the eastern bank of the Shatt. Thus Richard Frye maintains that the Arabs of Khuzistan and of the seaports of southern Persia were simply an extension of Arab settlements from the western bank.

In 1890, a British consulate was established at Muhammarah.

==== Relationship with central government ====
At the turn of the twentieth century, Arabistan was still a frontier zone that enjoyed considerable autonomy, and two prominent British observers of the time commented on its sense of separateness. In the words of journalist Valentine Chirol, “The Turk and the Persian are both aliens in the land, equally hated by the Arab population, and both have proved equally unworthy and incompetent stewards of a splendid estate. British imperialist George Curzon remarked that “No love is lost between the two people, the Persian regarding the Arab as an interloper and a dullard, and the Arab regarding the Persian, with some justice in this region, as a plotter and a rogue.

==== The discovery of oil in Khuzestan province ====
In 1901 the Persian government had granted businessman William Knox D'Arcy the exclusive right to drill for oil in certain parts of Persia, including the region in which the territories of the ruler of Arabistan were located. But in January 1903, the Shah of Persia, Mozaffar ad-Din Shah Qajar, granted a firman (Imperial edict) to the sheikh using language in which the Qajar government admitted, “at least by implication,” that it had exceeded its powers in conferring certain privileges on D’Arcy. The lands in question had belonged in the past to the sheikh, his tribesmen, and their ancestors.

In 1908, William Knox D'Arcy discovered oil near Masjed Soleiman by contract with its local ruler, Ali-Qoli Khan Bakhtiari.

==== Strategic importance of Mohammerah ====
Starting with Colonel Chesney’ s expeditions (1835–37) to prove the navigability of the Tigris and Euphrates, which concluded that Muhammarah should be the center of communications between India and Europe, the East India Company tried to establish a foothold in the region. As Gamazof notes, the scramble over Muhammarah was understandable, for it had many desirable features. These included its anchorage in the deep and broad Haffar Canal; its good weather, safe harbor, and sweet water; the possibility of constructing stores and a wharf, or even a complete port; its strategic command of the Karun and the Shatt and the great rivers forming it; and its proximity to the trade of Baghdad, Basra, and the many local tribes that carried on commerce independently.

The same conditions also protected them from intrusive Iranian interference, while acceptance of the suzerainty of Iran ’ s rulers further ensured independence from Ottoman interference. Yet acceptance of suzerainty did not necessarily mean recognition of sovereignty, and the multiple claims of suzerainty over them, which continued through the second half of the nineteenth century, gave them even more room to maneuver.

== See also ==
- Sheikhdom
