= God in Islam =

Islamic conception of God

In Islam, God (Arabic: ٱللَّٰه, romanized: Allāh, contraction of ٱلْإِلَٰه al-’Ilāh, lit. 'the God', or Arabic: رب, romanized: Rabb, lit. 'Lord') is seen as the Creator and Sustainer of the universe, whose existence has no beginning and no end. God is conceived as perfect, singular, formless, omnipotent, omniscient, omnibenevolent, completely infinite in all of his attributes, and the only ilah that has and ever will exist. Islam further emphasizes that God is The Most Merciful and Most Forgiving. The Islamic concept of God is variously described as monotheistic, panentheistic, and monistic.

The Islamic concept of tawhid (unification) emphasises that God is absolutely pure and free from association or partnership with other beings, which means attributing the powers and qualities of God to his creation, and vice versa. In Islam, God is never portrayed in any image. The Quran specifically forbids ascribing partners to share his singular sovereignty, as he is considered to be the absolute one without a second, indivisible, and incomparable being, who is similar to nothing, and nothing is comparable to him. Thus, God is absolutely transcendent, unique and utterly other than anything in or of the world as to be beyond all forms of human thought and expression. The briefest and the most comprehensive description of God in the Quran is found in Surat al-Ikhlas.

In theology, anthropomorphism (tashbīh) and corporealism (tajsīm) refer to beliefs in the human-like and materially embedded form of God, an idea that has been classically described as assimilating or comparing God to the creatures. By contrast, belief in the transcendence of God is called tanzih, which also rejects notions of incarnation and a personal god. Although tanzih is widely accepted in Islam today, it stridently competed for orthodox status until the tenth century, especially during the Mihna. Besides that, beyond purpose, excessive emphasis on God's uniqueness and transcendence may also mean stripping some of his human connotating attributes and names (Ta'til). Because, in addition to metaphors such as King (Malik) (Note: All except for ʻAsem, Al-Kesa’i, Yaʻqub and Khalaf in one of his narrations read al-Fatiha-4 as King of the Day of Judgement.) and Master (Rabb), it may also clearly contradicts the image of a god who is arrogant (al-Mutakabbir), angry (al-Jalīl), avenger (al-Muntaqim) but also compassionate (ar-Raḥīm), pardoner (Al-ʻAfūw) etc. and living Al-Ḥayy, who, as in Sufism, establishes a closeness with humans. (see; Sufi metaphysics, and Ali-Illahism) In premodern times, corporealist views were said to have been more socially prominent among the common people, with more abstract and transcendental views more common for the elite.

== Nomenclature ==
Allāh is the Arabic word referring to God in Abrahamic religions. In the English language, the word generally refers to God in Islam. The Arabic word Allāh is thought to be derived by contraction from al-ʾilāh, which means "the god", (i.e., the only god) and is related to El and Elah, the Hebrew and Aramaic words for God. It is distinguished from ʾilāh (Arabic: إِلَٰه), the Arabic word meaning deity, which could refer to any of the gods worshipped in pre-Islamic Arabia or to any other deity. It occurs in the Qur’an 2,697 times in 85 of its 114 suras.

Whether or not Allah can be considered as the personal name of God became disputed in contemporary scholarship. In Islamic usage and indoctrination, Allah is God's most unique, proper name, and referred to as Lafẓ al-Jalālah (The Word of Majesty). Those who claimed that Allah was the personal name of God also denied that this name was a derivative name. Jahm bin Safwan claimed that Allah is a name God created for himself and that names belong to the things God created. Some Muslims may use different names as much as Allah, for instance Rabb, Rahman and "God" in English. The Quran refers to the attributes of God as "most beautiful names".

They are traditionally enumerated as 99 in number to which is added as the highest Name (al-ism al-ʾaʿẓam), the Supreme Name of God. The locus classicus for listing the Divine Names in the literature of Qurʾānic commentary is 17:110 "Call upon Allah, or call upon The Merciful; whichsoever you call upon, to Allah belong the most beautiful Names," and also 59:22-24, which includes a cluster of more than a dozen Divine epithets."

Beside these Arabic names, Muslims of non-Arab origins may also sometimes use other names in their own languages to refer to God, such as Khuda in Persian, Bengali and Urdu. Tangri or Tengri was used in the Ottoman Turkish language as the equivalent of Allah. In Sufis, often characterised as the inner, mystical dimension of Islam, Hu, Huwa (depends on placement in the sentence), or Parvardigar in Persian are used as names of God. The sound Hu derives from the last letter of the word Allah, which is read as Allahu when in the middle of a sentence. Hu means 'Just He' or 'Revealed'. The word explicitly appears in many verses of the Quran:

"La ilaha illa Hu"

— Al Imran:18

== The Divine Realm ==
In Early Islam, the concepts of the Throne (Arsh), Pulpit (Kursi), Pen (Qalam), and others Bearers of the Throne described as being in the immediate vicinity of Allah, who is considered a personal deity, living in the heavens along with concepts such as Allah's sitting on a Throne, His right, and His left, led to problems of understanding in later periods, when Islamic theology developed and adopted a transcendent understanding of God. While these concepts were sometimes interpreted by theologians as metaphorical expressions intended to emphasize transcendence, others approached them with the attitude of "we believe in the essence, but we don't investigate how it is" ; "It (al-Kursī) is the "seat" of God's power, but without God sitting on it with bones, since bones and body belong to the created things".

Many Muslim communities emphasize the transcendence of God over local traditions and "allow...little room for mythological stories", although tales about jinn exist in all of them.

== Relationship with creation ==
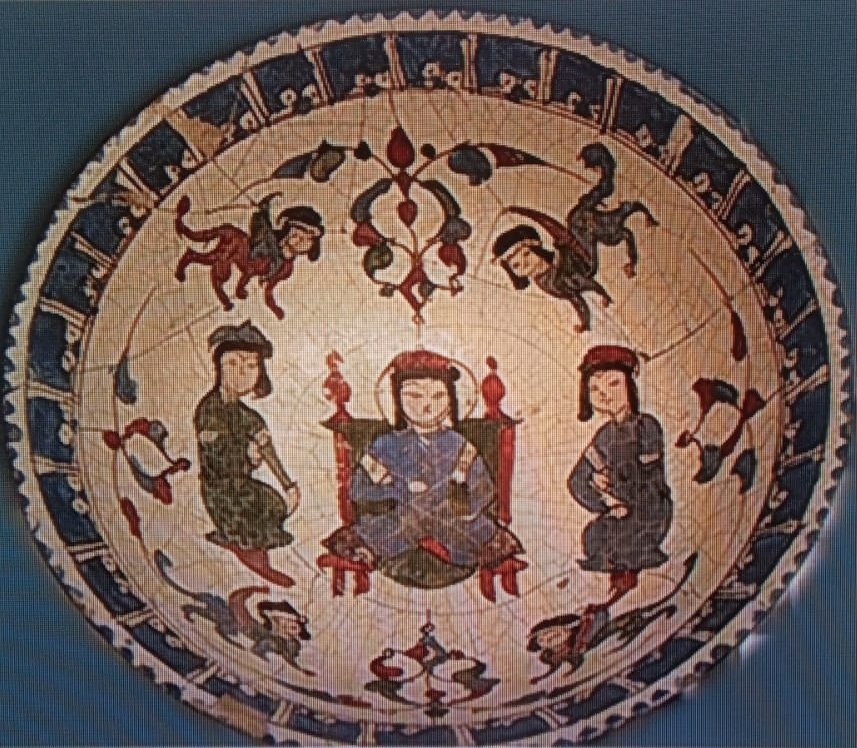
Kashan, Iran, late 12th–13th century mina'i-fritware bowl. The scene in this bowl is depicting the enthroned Sulaymān surrounded by jinn. In the Islamic belief, invisible beings (jinn, devils, angels, spirits, etc.) were as much a part of creation as the visible world.

In Islamic argumentation, while the existence of things is dependent, contingent, temporal, and dependent on a being beyond themselves, God is eternal, independent, self-sufficient, and does not require any other being for His existence, thus existing solely by Himself. The word used for God in Surah Ikhlas (al-Samad) is thought to imply this. This relationship also signifies that since God is the sustainer, he is in need of nothing, and even as he gives, nothing is diminished from his treasury.

It is believed that God created everything for a divine purpose; the universe is governed by fixed laws that ensure the harmonious working of all things. Everything within the universe, including inanimate objects, praises God, and is in this sense understood as a Muslim. Humans and jinn have to live voluntarily in accordance with these laws to find peace and reproduce God's benevolence in their own society to live in accordance with the nature of all things, known as surrender to God in the Islamic sense. Muslims believe that God is the sole source of all creation, and that everything, including its creatures, are just a derivative reality created out of love and mercy by God's command, "..."Be," and it is" and that the purpose of existence is to worship or to know God.

=== Creation theories ===
Muslim theologians and philosophers, with only a few exceptions, agree that God is the origin of the cosmos' existence. However, there is disagreement about how God creates the cosmos and what types of causalities exist; While most philosophers adhered to a theory of emanation (fayaḍān), theologians usually preferred occasionalism (iḥdāth). The third theory, often represented in Islamic mysticism, understands the world as the manifestation (maẓhar) of a single reality.

"The emanation theory" states that the universe has emanated from God since eternity and assert a causal mediation between the lower and the higher things (i.e. the lower things do not come directly from God, but from the higher things). God is considered the only necessary existence, the rest of creation as contingent. Since God is described as "knowing" and "perfect," God must know Himself perfectly and know that He is the cause of all existence. But in order to have perfect knowledge of a cause, one must also know the effect of the cause. Therefore, God knows every form of existence in past, future, and present. Based on the model of ibn Sina, God knows about the existence of x because of x, whereas humans know about a thing x from another thing x'. Therefore, God would create the universe in eternity. To further support this argument, emanationists point out against Creation ex Nihilo, that, if God were to decide to create the universe at a certain point in time, God would have a change of mind, affected by something external. Since God is the source of everything, something external could not have affected God. This was contrary to the idea that God was eternal and unchanging (changing things would have a lifespan and could not be god). Theologians found the emanation theory to be unconvincing, because the theory equates God to much with nature, by that, restricting God's freedom. Instead, they propose, God created the world from nothing at a certain point t in time. In response to the emanationists' objection, that for Creation ex Nihilo, a change in the will of God would be required, al-Ghazali explains that God has willed from all eternity, to create the world at a certain time t. Additionally, God would not only have created the universe at a time t, but also continues to create the universe in any following moment.

In Islamic philosophical-theological discussions, a distinction between God and creatures is made based on the immutability of God and the change and mortality of creatures depending on time. A variant of the theory of the manifestation of a single reality can be found particularly in Mulla Sadra, who was inspired by Ibn Arabi. According to Mulla Ṣadra, only God is eternal and perfect, the universe, including its inhabitants, is constantly changing. Because of that, everything is in a constant process of growth and decay. The prophets and the angels were also integrated into this universalistic understanding of God. According to Haydar Amuli, who also builds on Ibn Arabi's metaphysics, the angels are the representatives of God's beautiful names (and devils of the "imperious names of God"). Islamic philosophy asserts that God is eternal (qadim) and thus timeless. Islamic theology defines time as the subsequent change of things, making a contradiction between an originated "world" (dunya) which is subject to change, and God, who is without change. Ghazali explains in his response to the question "what was God doing before creation?" that time does not coexist with God or the world. A contemporary of ibn Hanbal asserts an even more strict position, claiming that God transcends time, thus it cannot be said that God is "before things" or "the first cause". In Islamic philosophy, it is assumed that the "ayan-ı sabite", (The immutable knowledge of beings), existed in God's knowledge before beings came into existence; with this assumption, it is argued that God is immutable in his knowledge as well as in his body. The other side of this theory involves discussions of predestination, human will, and responsibility. For if everything were predetermined, holding humans accountable for their actions would be absurd and contrary to divine wisdom.

=== God and religion ===
The claim that God communicates with humans is the foundation of the divine religion claim. Accordingly, God will communicate with humans on various levels and convey His wishes through them; this communication will take the form of divine inspiration, revelation (wahy), communication through angels, and finally, God's manifestation (tajalli) and direct face-to-face encounters with God. The possibility of these forms of communication, and if they are real, whether they are binding on others, are among the topics debated by Islamic philosophy and theologians.

Some Islamic theorists claim that there is only one religion of God called Islam and that all the prophets sent to every nation, numbering thousands in total, whome missions was to invite people to the same path; and they argue that every prophet preached the same core beliefs: the Unity of God and worshipping of that one God; avoidance of idolatry and the belief in the Day of Judgement. The Islamic understanding of tawhid teaches that these prophets are merely messengers of the message, and the consideration of prophets or religious figures as mediators or intermediate forms between God and humans is strongly rejected (Shirk). However, it is not uncommon for various Islamic groups to attribute extraordinary powers over the universe (Karamat) to their religious-political leaders.

Muslims believe that the Quran, like other holy books, is the literal word of God revealed to Muhammad. However, they believe that other holy books are outdated and corrupted, and that the Quran is under divine protection. Another divine word in Islam is the hadith qudsi. According to al-Sharif al-Jurjani, the statements of God in the hadith qudsi are "expressed through the words of Muhammad," while the Quran is the "direct word of God."

Muslims address/contact God directly in their prayers, supplications and dhikr, and also seek forgiveness and repentance from sins directly from God, as the Qur'an states: "And when My servants ask you about Me, then surely I am near: I answer the prayer of the suppliant when he prays to Me."^{[Quran 2:186]} In Islamic interpretations, it is believed that God will answer every prayer, but how this will happen depends on divine wisdom. Therefore, no human being should lose hope in God and lose his devotion to Him.

While Muslims accept God as unquestionable due to his greatness and wisdom, in theory everyone else, including the prophets, is questionable; "He shall not be questioned about what He does, but they shall be questioned."^{[Quran 21:23]}, however, in practice, in traditional Islamic sects, the Quran and authentic hadith can only be interpreted, while Quranism takes a different path in this regard and rejects the authority of hadiths.

== Attributes ==
Al-Bukhari, in his Ṣaḥīḥ Bukhārī, narrates a hadith qudsi that God says, "I am as My servant thinks (expects) I am." When Sufis claim union with God, it is not that they become one in essence, rather the will of the Sufi is fully congruent to God. The Sufis are in fact careful to say, no matter what degree of union is realized, "the slave remains the slave, and the Lord remains the Lord".

=== Oneness ===
Islam's most fundamental concept is a strict monotheism, affirming (tawhid) that God is one (wahdat). The fundamental teaching of Islam, Shahada (recited in the oath taken for formal entry into Islam), is: لَا إِلَٰهَ إِلَّا ٱللَّٰهُ أَشْهَدُ أنَّ (āšhadu ānnā lā ʾilāha ʾilla llāh), or "I testify there is no deity other than Allah (God).

In Islamist circles, Islam is often described as a struggle for monotheism against shirk and constitutes the foremost article of the Muslim profession. In addition to their other religious and social uses, the terms tawhid and takbir are widely used in Islamic sloganeering. Although the term "shirk" is usually translated as "polytheism" into English, the sin is thought to be more complex. The translation 'associating [with God]' has been suggested instead. The term includes denial of attributing any form of divinity to any other thing but God. This includes the self by elevating oneself above others and associating attributes of God with a created being.

According to Vincent J. Cornell, the Quran also provides a monist image of God by describing the reality as a unified whole, with God being a single concept that would describe or ascribe all existing things: "He is the First and the Last, the Evident and the Immanent: and He has full knowledge of all things." Though Muslims believe Jesus to be a prophet, the Trinity and divinity doctrine of normative Christianity concerning Jesus is rejected and often compared to polytheism.

=== Uniqueness ===
Islamic theology emphasises the absolute uniqueness and singularity of God in his essence, attributes, qualities, and acts. This emphasis was made despite a number of verses and hadiths that offer analogies for God, and it was gradually established over time. Instead, the term "mutashabih" was used for these verses, and the approach of "believing in the essence, not searching for its meaning" (Bila Kayf) was adopted. Understandings and expressions contrary to these definitions (tanzih) were described as shirk, which is considered one of the greatest sins in Islam, and it was said that those who did so would leave the religion. (See also; (Ta'til). Approach was based on certain verses and Quranic words like Ahad and Samad, -which were given meanings that pushed boundaries-;

As stated in Surat al-Ikhlas: God is Ahad (the unique one of absolute oneness, who is indivisible in nature, and there can be no other like him); God is As-Samad(the ultimate source of all existence, the uncaused cause who created all things out of nothing, who is eternal, absolute, immutable, perfect, complete, essential, independent, and self-sufficient; who needs nothing while all of creation is in absolute need of him; the one eternally and constantly required and sought, depended upon by all existence and to whom all matters will ultimately return); he begets not, nor is he begotten (He is Unborn and Uncreated, has no parents, wife or offspring); and comparable/equal to him, there is none.

The Qur'anic verse (19:65), "The Lord of the heavens and the earth and whatever is between them. So worship Him, and (endure) patiently, constantly in His worship. Do you know of any that is given His namesake" emphasizes that (Nurettin Uzunoğlu's interpretetion) as Allah is Unique, also with His name.

So, do not invent similitudes for God. Surely God knows and you do not know.

— Quran 16:74

The Originator of the heavens and the earth: He has made for you, from your selves, mates, and from the cattle mates: by this means He multiplies you. There is nothing whatever like Him. He is the All-Hearing, the All-Seeing.

— Quran 42:11

For the disbelievers in the Hereafter, there is an evil description,(16:57-59) for their ascribing female gender to angels and claiming that the angels are the daughters of God while so preferring sons for themselves (this is also mentioned in the verses 37:149-155); whereas to God belong the highest attribute, namely, that there is no deity except him, immensely exalted beyond and above all comparison and likeness. The sentiment in the Qur'anic verse (6:103) states: "Vision perceives / comprehends Him not, and He perceives / comprehends all vision." In some interpretations, this verse also asserts that the senses and intellects cannot fully comprehend God. Likewise, the Qur'an also says: "whereas they cannot comprehend Him with their knowledge."^{[Quran 20:110]}

The Hanafi jurist and theologian, al-Tahawi (d. 321/933), wrote in his treatise on theology, commonly known as al-'Aqida al-Tahawiyya: Al-Tahawi refutes the anthropomorphist view that Allah has a humanoid physical body in a place (eg. arsh), direction or etc.

"Whoever describes Allah even with a single human quality / attribute, has disbelieved / blasphemed. So whoever understands this, will take heed and refrain from such statements as those of disbelievers, and knows that Allah in His attributes is utterly unlike human beings." / "He is exalted / transcendent beyond having limits, ends, organs, limbs and parts (literally: tools). The six directions do not encompass/contain Him like the rest of created things."

=== Creator ===
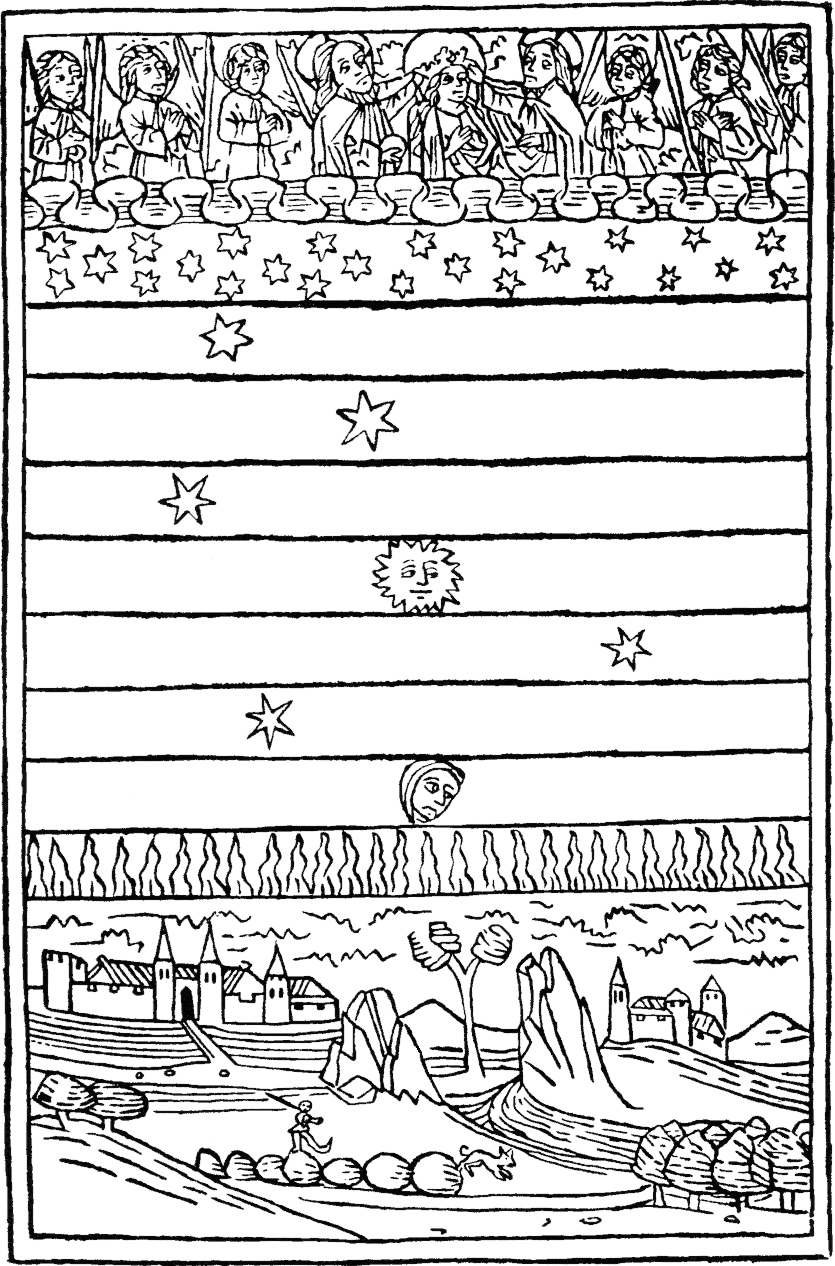
A wood carving from 1475, showing 7 celestial bodies. The 5 planets that can be seen with the naked eye, and the Sun and the Moon, each floating in a heavenly layer, the Arabic Felaq in ancient cosmology

According to the teachings of Islam, God is the creator of the worlds and all the creatures therein. He has created everything in the worlds in accordance with a definite plan and for a particular purpose. There is no shortcoming or defect of any sort in any of his creations. The Qur'an confirms this in the following verses:

Quran 39:62; "God is the Creator of all things, and He is the Guardian over all things."

Quran 54:49; "We have created each and every thing by measure."

Quran 21:30; "Do those who disbelieve ever consider that the heavens and the earth were at first one piece, and then We parted them as separate entities; and that We have made every living thing from water? Will they still not come to believe?"

The Qur'an also says in verse (25:2): "and He has created everything and designed it in a perfect measure." And in another verse (25:59) it is emphasized: "It is He who created the heavens and the earth, and all that is between them."

The Qur'an states that God is the Rabb al-'Alamin. When referring to God, the Arabic term "Rabb" is usually translated as "Lord" and can include all of the following meanings: "owner, master, ruler, controller, creator, upbringer, trainer, sustainer, nourisher, cherisher, provider, protector, guardian and caretaker." The same term, Rabb, is used in a limited sense for humans as in the "head" of the family, "master" of the house, or "owner" of the land or cattle. The Arabic word "al-'Alamin" can be translated as the "Worlds" or "Universes". There are many worlds, astronomical and physical worlds, worlds of thought, spiritual worlds, everything in existence including angels, jinn, devils, humans, animals, plants, and so on. The "Worlds" may also be taken to refer to different domains or kingdoms within this earthly world, or other worlds beyond this earth. Thus, the Qur'anic expression Rabb al-'Alamin really means the "Creator of the Worlds", the "Ruler of the Universes", the "Creator and Sustainer of all the peoples and Universes".

=== Mercy ===
The most commonly used names in the primary sources are Al-Rahman, meaning "Most Compassionate" and Al-Rahim, meaning "Most Merciful". The former compasses the whole creation, therefore applying to God's mercy in that it gives every necessary condition to make life possible. The latter applies to God's mercy in that it gives favor for good deeds. Thus Al-Rahman includes both the believers and the unbelievers, but Al-Rahim only the believers. God is said to love forgiving, with a hadith stating God would replace a sinless people with one who sinned but still asked repentance.

God's mercy, according to Islamic theology, is what gets a person into paradise. According to a hadith in Sahih Al Bukhari "No one's deeds will ever admit him to Paradise." They said, "Not even you, O Messenger of Allah?" He said, "No, not even me unless Allah showers me with His Mercy. So try to be near to perfection. And no one should wish for death; he is either doing good so he will do more of that, or he is doing wrong so he may repent."

=== Omniscience ===
God's omniscience is the knowledge of all things, whether they are actual or possible or whether they are past, present, or future. It also includes his knowledge of people, places, events, circumstances, etc. God has full knowledge of everything, everywhere, always and from eternity past, and he is fully aware of whatever one thinks, intends, and does, and the reins of all things and events are in his power. He knows whatever happens in the universe, down to the fall of a leaf, and he knows all the deeds, thoughts, and intentions of humankind. His appointed angels record these, and people will be called to account for these acts in the other world. His knowledge is eternal in the sense of being timeless, i.e., atemporal. So, since God's knowledge is eternal and unchanging, it is likewise self‐existent and infinite. It is self‐existent in that it is not dependent on anything, not even time. According to the Qur'an, God (Allah) is omniscient; he eternally knows whatever comes into being, be it universal or particular in character. He has known all things from before the creation of the world. His knowledge of things before their coming into existence and afterwards is exactly the same. Hence, there is no discovery or surprise with God. Muslim theologians therefore considered that "omniscience" is a necessary and "ignorance" is an impossible property for God. Various Qur'anic verses designate this basic intuition, such as: 3:5, 6:59, 65:12, and 24:35.

== Concepts in Islamic theology ==
According to mainstream Muslim theologians, God is described as Qadim ('ancient'), meaning that He has no beginning or end and is eternal. He is absolute, unrestricted by time, place, or circumstance, and is not subject to any decree that would determine Him by limits or fixed times. Rather, He is the First and the Last. He is neither a physical body nor a substance circumscribed by limits or defined by measure. Nor does He resemble bodies, which are capable of being measured or divided. No substances exist within Him, nor is He an accident, and no accidents exist in Him. He is unlike anything that exists, and nothing is like Him. He is not defined by quantity, comprehended by boundaries, circumscribed by spatial distinctions, or contained within the heavens. He transcends all spatial and temporal limitations and remains beyond the bounds of human comprehension and perception.

=== Sunnis ===
==== Atharis ====
For Atharis the names and attributes of God are to be understood with the formula of bila kayfa (lit. "without how", i.e., "without modality", "without further enquiry" or "without further specifying their manner or modality"), which is to unquestioningly accept the Divine attributes of God without ta'wil (allegorical interpretation), or ta'til (lit. "suspension", i.e., "divesting God of His attributes"), or tashbih (anthropomorphism, immanence or comparison, which is to believe that God resembles his creations, or attributing the attributes of human beings to God). Any anthropomorphic expressions of these names and attributes is negated using the admission that their meanings can never be known. The meaning is left to the knowledge of God himself, and they simply say that the meaning is as befits his majesty and perfection. This method of tafwid is that of Ahmad ibn Hanbal (eponymous founder of Atharism), al-Ash'ari, Ibn Qudama, and Ibn Kathir.

Usually Atharis are vehemently opposed to engaging in ta'wil (allegorical interpretations) and reject batin (inner meaning) or hidden/esoteric (Sufi) interpretations of the Qur'an and God's divine attributes. In maintaining that one is not permitted to interpret the meaning of the Qur'anic verses or the Prophetic traditions that mention various attributes of God, Ibn Qudama (d. 620/1223) in his work Lum'at al-I'tiqad ("The Luminance of Creed") is endorsing the principle of bila kayfa ('without [asking or knowing] how') in Islamic theology. According to this principle, one has to accept the sacred text as it is, indissolubly linked with tanzih (God's incomparability and transcendence), without trying to interpret its meaning. In other words, one must accept the sacred texts that refer to God without positively ascribing corporeal features to him.

Ibn al-Jawzi (d. 597/1201) took the question of people associating anthropomorphism with Hanbalism so seriously that he wrote a book, Daf' Shubah al-Tashbih bi-Akaff al-Tanzih ("Rebuttal of the Insinuations of Anthropomorphism at the Hands of Divine Transcendence"), with the aim of refuting anthropomorphic views and arguing that Ahmad ibn Hanbal was not an anthropomorphist. (Note: Ibn al-Jawzi's Daf' Shubah al-Tashbih is a refutation of the historical anthropomorphic leanings of some of the Hanbali scholars.) According to him, such words whose meanings could give the impression that God resembles his creations should not be understood literally, such as God's face, hands, eyes, and the like.

Another book was written by the Shafi'i scholar, Taqi al-Din al-Hisni (d. 829/1426), titled Daf' Shubah man Shabbaha wa Tamarrad wa Nasaba dhalik ila al-Sayyid al-Jalil al-Imam Ahmad ("Rebuttal of the Insinuations of him who makes Anthropomorphisms and Rebels, and Ascribes that to the Noble Master Imam Ahmad"), defending Ahmad ibn Hanbal against the innovated beliefs later ascribed to him by Ibn Taymiyya and those who claimed to follow his school.

Ibn Kathir (d. 774/1373) appears to offer a definition similar to that of al-Ash'ari (d. 324/936) when he discusses tafwid in his exegesis of the Qur'anic verse (7:54) pertaining to God's istiwa'. He states:

People have said a great deal on this topic, and this is not the place to expound on what they have said. On this matter, we follow the good ancestors (i.e., the way of the earliest Muslims, dubbed the pious ancestors, in Arabic, al-salaf al-salih (Note: In religious usage, it refers to the earliest Muslim generations, the righteous ancestors, in Arabic al-salaf al-salih.)): Malik, al-Awza'i, al-Thawri, al-Layth ibn Sa'd, al-Shafi'i, Ahmad, Ishaq ibn Rahwayh, and others among the imams of the Muslims, both ancient and modern—that is: to let it (the verse in question) pass as it has come, without saying how it is meant (min ghayr takyif), without likening it to created things (wa la tashbih), and without nullifying it (wa la ta'til). The external, literal meaning (zahir) (Note: The Arabic word zahir, meaning obvious, apparent, external or literal.) that occurs to the minds of anthropomorphists (al-mushabbihīn) is negated of Allah, for nothing from his creation resembles him: "There is nothing whatsoever like unto Him, and He is the All-Hearing, the All-Seeing" [Qur'an 42:11].

Here Ibn Kathir is diverting the meaning of the text from its apparent meaning, and implicitly affirming that one valid definition of the term zahir is its literal linguistic meaning, which is anthropomorphic. Nevertheless, some modern followers of Ibn Taymiyya claim that bi lā takyīf would only mean tafwid of modality but not of meaning (ma'na), but Ash'aris/Maturidis assert that modality (kayfiyya) is a part of meaning, and without detailing which aspect of meaning remains after de-anthropomorphizing a term, one ends up with tafwid. In addition to that the imams of the salaf (the righteous early generations of Muslims) used to say bila kayf (without how or modality at all). On the other hand, both Ibn Taymiyya (d. 728/1328) and his student Ibn al-Qayyim (d. 751/1350) argued that the anthropomorphic references to God, such as God's hands or face, are to be understood literally and affirmatively according to their apparent meanings. In their footsteps and following them come the Salafi groups of modern times such as the followers of Muhammad ibn 'Abd al-Wahhab (d. 1201/1787) who closely follow Ibn Taymiyya's approach regarding the Divine names and attributes.

The doctrine of the Salaf (Note: "Salaf" is a contested term, but generally and quite literally means ancestor, and is usually used as part of the expression al-salaf al-salih, i.e., "the virtuous forefathers." The Salaf included the companions of Muhammad and the early first three generations of Islam, conventionally ending with Ahmad ibn Hanbal in the ninth century, although a number of later Islamic scholars are included, such as al-Tahawi (d. 321/933), al-Ash'ari (d. 324/935) and al-Maturidi (d. 333/944). However, this is not to be confused with the Salafi movement.) that Ibn Taymiyya derives from his traditionalist sources consists in describing God as he describes himself and as his messenger describes him, neither stripping the attributes away (ta'til) in the fashion of kalam (rational or speculative theology), nor likening (tamthil) them to the attributes of creatures because there is nothing like God [Q. 42:11]. For Ibn Taymiyya, this means that the Salaf knew the meanings of the Divine attributes, and they do not merely delegate them to God. However, certain formulaic statements attributed to them do not appear to support his position unequivocally. Ibn Taymiyya notes that al-Awza'i (d. 157/774), Sufyan al-Thawri (d. 161/778), and others said concerning the attributes, "Let them pass by as they came", and "Let them pass by as they came, without how". He explains that letting the attributes pass by (imrār) means leaving them intact and not stripping away their meanings, while affirming the attributes "without how" or "without modality" (bi-lā kayf) means not assimilating them to the attributes of creatures. With this, Ibn Taymiyya holds affirmation of the meanings of God's attributes together with denial of their likeness to creatures in a double perspective by drawing a distinction between the known meanings of the attributes and their inscrutable modalities.

Ibn Taymiyya does not clarify how modality (kayfiyya) and meaning (ma'na) relate to each other semantically. Rather, he deploys the two terms in tandem to maintain the seemingly paradoxical conviction that God is completely different and beyond human experience on the one hand while God's attributes do signify something real and meaningful in human language on the other. In denying knowledge of the modality and affirming knowledge of the meaning, Ibn Taymiyya does not resolve the paradox, nor even acknowledge it, but simply holds its two sides together in the conviction that this is the most faithful and rational set of beliefs.

It is often assumed that the question of God's nature has occupied the minds of early Muslims, and as such Muhammad forbade them from thinking about it, as he said: "Think about God's bounties, but do not think about God's essence (dhat). Otherwise, you will vanish/perish." Accordingly, Muslims should not think about what God is, but about his attributes and his blessings granted to humanity, because God's essence (dhat) cannot be understood by the limited human capacity. In this regard it has been mentioned in some narrations that are ascribed to Ahmad ibn Hanbal (d. 241/855), it has been reported that he said: (Note: This statement also attributed to Dhu al-Nun al-Misri (d. 246/861).) "Whatever comes to your mind (i.e., regarding God and His nature), God is different than that." Or in the words: "God is completely different from whatever comes to your mind concerning Him."

According to al-Shahrastani (d. 548/1154) in his al-Milal wa al-Nihal ("Religious Sects and Divisions"), Ahmad ibn Hanbal and Dawud al-Zahiri (d. 270/884) and a group of imams of the Salaf, they followed the way of the early traditionalists (ashab al-hadith), such as Malik ibn Anas (d. 179/795). They took a safe path, saying "We believe in whatever is reported from the Book and the Sunna, and we do not try to interpret it, knowing for certain that God does not resemble any created things, and that all the images we form of Him are created by Him and formed by Him". They avoided anthropomorphism (tashbih) to such an extent that they said that if a man moved his hand while reading the Qur'anic verse that speaks of God's creating Adam using his own "hands" 38:75 Q.; or if he pointed with his two fingers while reporting the hadith: "The heart of the believer is between the two fingers of al-Rahman (the Most Compassionate)", his hand must be cut off and the two fingers torn out.

These early scholars were often called the People of Tradition (Ahl al-Hadith), or Salaf such as Abu Hanifa, Malik, al-Shafi'i and Ahmad ibn Hanbal. They left the verses of the Qur'an in question as well as the related hadiths simply as they were, accepting the poetical statements just as they occurred, without applying much reason either to criticize or expand upon them. Their position was that these ambiguous verses must be understood in light of the Qur'anic dictum that, "There is nothing whatever like Him" [Q. 42:11] hence negating all possibilities of anthropomorphism. At the same time, they used and maintained the same phrases or terminology implied by the Qur'an with regards to God such as God's face without looking further into their meaning or exegesis. And this is what is being referred to by use of their phrase bila kayfa wa la tashbih, meaning without inquiring how and without anthropomorphism or comparison.

However, according to some scholars, Ahmad ibn Hanbal, like the other early Muslims, also gave some figurative interpretations (ta'wil) to scriptural expressions that might otherwise have been misinterpreted anthropomorphically, which is what neo-Salafis condemn the Ash'ari and Maturidi schools for doing. For example, Ibn Kathir reports that al-Bayhaqi (d. 458/1066) related from al-Hakim (d. 405/1014), from Abu 'Amr ibn al-Sammak (d. 344/955), from Hanbal [ibn Ishaq al-Shaybani] (d. 273/886), the son of the brother of Ahmad ibn Hanbal's father, that "Ahmad ibn Hanbal (d. 241/855) figuratively interpreted the word of Allah Most High, ‘And your Lord comes...’ 89:22 Q., as meaning ‘His recompense (thawab) shall come’." Al-Bayhaqi then said, "This chain of narrators has absolutely nothing wrong in it". Ibn Hazm (d. 456/1064) in his book al-Fasl fi al-Milal wa al-Ahwa' wa al-Nihal ("The Distinction Concerning Religions, Heresies, and Sects") said also that Ahmad ibn Hanbal figuratively interpreted ‘And your Lord comes...’ [Q. 89:22], but as meaning "And your Lord's command/decree has come."

Among the most significant Athari theological works are:

- Naqd ‘Uthman ibn Sa’id Ad-Darimi 'ala Al-Marisi al Jahmi al 'aneed fi ma iftara 'ala Allah fit tawheed by Uthman ibn Sa'id al-Darimi (d. 280/815).
- Kitaab at-Tawheed by Ibn Khuzayma (d. 311/924).
- Kitaab al-'Uluww al-'Aliyy al-Ghafaar and Kitaab al-'Arsh by Al-Dhahabi (d. 748/1348).
- Lawami' al-Anwar al-Bahiyya wa Sawati' al-Asrar al-Athariyya by Al-Saffarini (d. 1188/1774).
- Bahjat al-Nazirin wa Ayat al-Mustadillin (The Delight of Onlookers and the Signs for Investigators) by Mar'i al-Karmi (d. 1033/1624), on cosmology and the affairs of the Last Judgment and the Afterlife.

==== Ash'aris and Maturidis ====
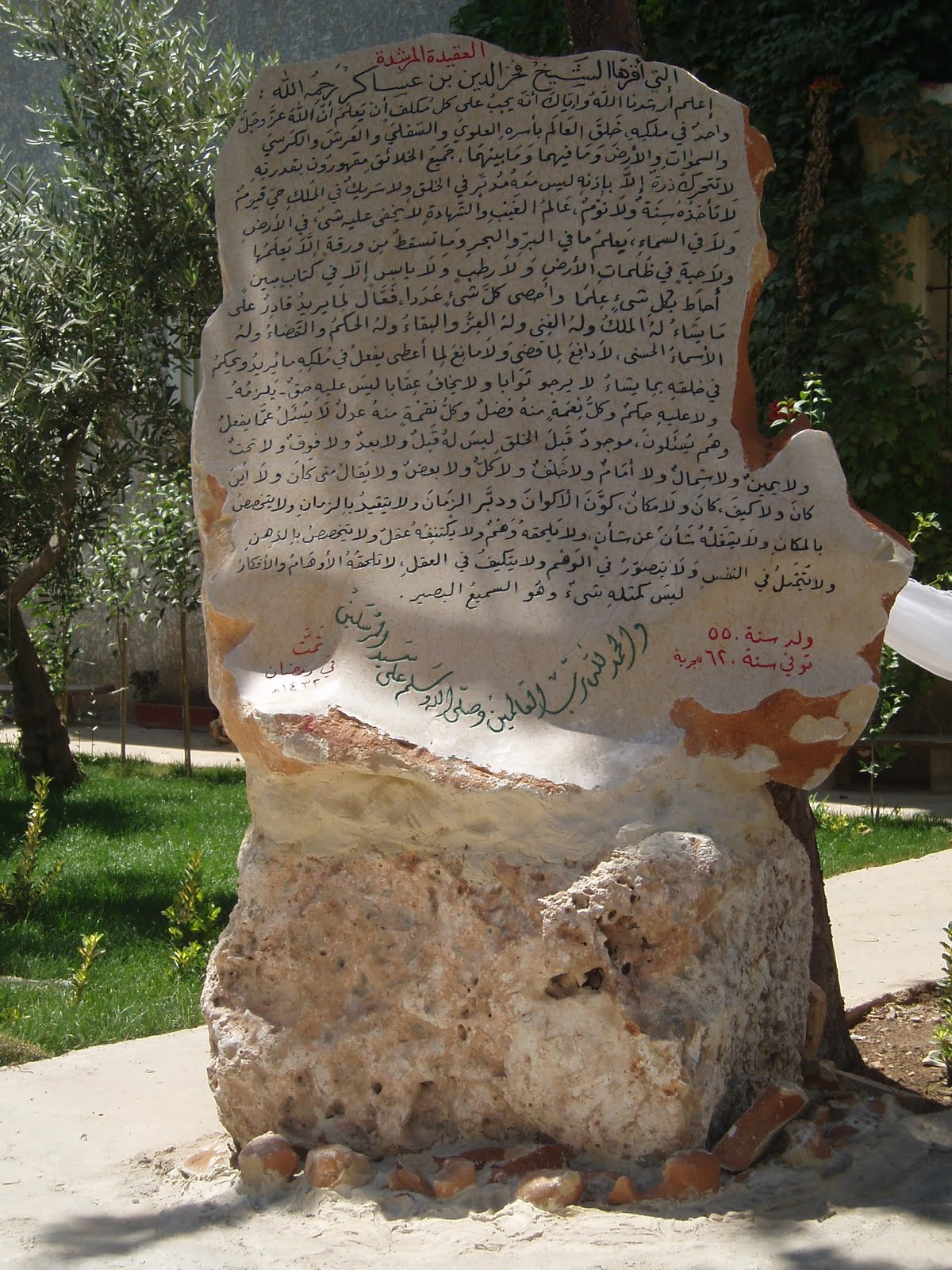
A rock carved with the text of "al-'Aqida al-Murshida" (the Guiding Creed) by Ibn Tumart (d. 524/1130) — the student of al-Ghazali (d. 505/ 1111) and the founder of the Almohad dynasty — praised and approved by Fakhr al-Din Ibn 'Asakir (d. 620/1223), located at al-Salah Islamic secondary school in Baalbek, Lebanon.

Ash'aris and Maturidis are in agreement that God's attributes are eternal and are to be held to be metaphorically. References to anthropomorphic attributes can probably not be understood correctly by humans. Although God's existence is considered to be possibly known by reason, human mind can not fully understand God's attributes. Ash'ari and Maturidi scholars have two positions regarding the Mutashabihat texts (ambiguous passages in the Qur'an and Hadith) related to God's attributes: Tafwid (affirming the attributes of God, but consigning/entrusting both their meaning and modality to God, or in other words, leaving the interpretation of anthropomorphic expressions to God) and Ta'wil (metaphorical interpretation). The two positions disregard the literal meaning of the texts due to the definitive evidences denoting the transcendence of God above the attributes of his created beings as per his words: "There is nothing whatever like Him."^{[Quran 42:11]} and "And comparable to Him there is none."^{[Quran 112:4]} For example, when believers in paradise see God, they do not see God in the way humans are able to see on Earth. Ash'aris and Maturidis asserts, since God is the creator of everything that exists and creation neither affects nor alters God, the Throne of God is not a dwelling place for God.

Abu Mansur al-Baghdadi (d. 429/1037) in his al-Farq bayn al-Firaq (The Difference between the Sects) reports that 'Ali ibn Abi Talib, the fourth Caliph, said: "Allah created the Throne as an indication of His power, not for taking it as a place for Himself." Accordingly, expressions such as God's istiwa' on the Throne means by ta'wil or figurative interpretation, exercise of his power upon the universe, this denotes his assumption of authority of his created world, the throne being a symbol of authority and dominion, while in tafwid, they just say: Allahu A'lam (God knows best), together with their understanding of Tanzih (God's incomparability and transcendence), which means that his istiwa' upon the throne, in the manner which he himself has described, and in that same sense which he himself means, which is far removed from any notion of contact, or resting upon, or local situation. It is impermissible to say that he established himself with a contact or a meeting with it. Because God is not subject to change, substitution, nor limits, whether before or after the creation of the throne.

Ash'aris and Maturidis are in general agreement that God is free from all imperfections and flaws. He has Divine attributes. Divine attributes are characteristics or qualities that God alone possesses. The Divine attributes are classified into: negative and positive. By the "Negative Attribute" they mean the negation of the negative, i.e. negation of imperfection. Among the most important are the following:

- The negative divine attributes are of two kinds; firstly those which are meant to deny all imperfections in God's Being, e.g., that he has no equal and no rival, no parents and no children; secondly those which indicate his beyondness, e.g., that he is not body or physical, is neither substance nor attribute, is not space or spatial, is not limited or finite, has neither dimensions nor relations, i.e., he is above the application of our categories of thought.
- The positive divine attributes are such as life, knowledge, power, will, hearing, seeing, and speaking.

The Ash'ari and Maturidi scholars emphasise that the Qur'an expresses that God does not need any of his creation as he is perfect. He is immutable (does not change), self-subsisting and self-sufficient, without figure, form, colour or parts. His existence has neither beginning nor end. He is not a body composed of substances or elements. He is not an accident inherent in a body or dwelling in a place. He is unique, unlike anything in his creation. He is ineffable, beyond human understanding, comprehension and therefore human description, as per his words: "There is nothing whatever like Him."^{[Quran 42:11]}

He is omnitemporal in the way that he is omnipresent, as per his words: "And He is with you, wherever you may be."^{[Quran 57:4]} He is everywhere by his knowledge and power, and nowhere, without being in a place, direction or location, because He existed eternally before all the creations (including time and space) and is clear from change. He is always in the present, yet transcends time. God is not within time; time is one of his creations and does not affect him, so for him there is no past, present and future.

The Hanafi-Maturidi scholar, 'Ali al-Qari (d. 1014/1606) in his Sharh al-Fiqh al-Akbar states: "Allah the Exalted is not in any place or space, nor is He subject to time, because both time and space are amongst His creations. He the Exalted was present in pre-existence and there was nothing of the creation with Him".

Thus, according to Maturidis and Ash'aris, God is beyond time and space, and is transcendent, infinite (not limited) and eternal, without beginning or end, as per his words: "He is the First, the Last, the All-Outward, and the All-Inward."^{[Quran 57:3]} A hadith mentioned in Sahih Muslim explains this part of the verse as follows:

O Allah, You are the First, there is none that precedes You. You are the Last, there is none that will outlive You. You are al-Zahir (the Manifest or the Most High), and there is nothing above You. You are al-Batin (the Hidden or the Most Near), and there is nothing below You (or nearer than You).

At the same time, he is near to everything that has being; nay, he is nearer to men than their jugular veins (this is alluded to in the verse 50:16), and is witness to everything —though his nearness is not like the nearness of bodies, as neither is his essence like the essence of bodies. Neither does he exist in anything or does anything exist in him; but he is beyond space and time; for he is the creator of space and time, and was before space and time were created, and is now after the same manner as He always was (i.e., without place nor time).

He is also distinct from the creatures in his attributes, neither is there anything besides himself in his essence, nor is his essence in any other besides him. He is too holy to be subject to change or any local motion; neither do any accidents dwell in him, nor any contingencies before him; but he abides with his glorious attributes, free from all danger of dissolution. As to the attribute of perfection, he wants no addition. As to being, he is known to exist by the apprehension of the understanding; and he is seen as he is by immediate intuition, which will be vouchsafed out of his mercy and grace to the believers in the paradise, completing their joy by the vision of his glorious presence.

The possibility of seeing God in the afterlife became a pillar of the Ash'ari and the Maturidi schools. Al-Ash'ari holds that God will be seen in the next world by sight. Al-Maturidi also accepts the visibility of God, however his explanation is qualified: people will see God in way that it is incomprehensible to humans in this life and is not like the normal sight that we use to sense light and distance. Al-Ghazali promised that people would enjoy the pleasure of looking on God's noble face.

Ash'aris and Maturidis insisted on the reality of that vision even if they admitted their inability to fully explain how it will happen. According to them, God can be seen even if he cannot be perceived through vision. Al-Ghazali in his al-Iqtisad fi al-I'tiqad (Moderation in Belief) explains the Ash'ari position that God will be seen in the afterlife despite the fact that he has no physical body, nor any location or direction.

Mu'tazilis and Shi'is deny that God can be seen for the simple reason that visibility, as man understands it requires the object of vision to be in place and this is inconceivable in reference to God. Ash'aris and Maturidis agree with this proposition, but only if they are talking of vision here on Earth and within the physical laws applicable here. However, if it is going to happen somewhere else and under a different set of laws, visibility is possible, for whatever exists can be seen under proper conditions.

Ash'aris and Maturidis unanimously agree that it is only in the Hereafter that God will be seen. Among the evidences that have been used by them in establishing the permissibility of seeing God are the following:

22. Some faces on that Day will be radiant (with contentment), 23. Looking up toward their Lord.

— translated by Ali Ünal, Quran, Al-Qiyama 75:22-23

For those who do good is the greatest good, and even more.

— translated by Nureddin Uzunoğlu, Quran, Yunus 10:26

Goodness (or ihsan, husna) is to act in accordance with the wise commandments of God. Muhammad defined it as being a servant to God as though one saw him. The greatest good shall be for them (i.e., Paradise), and also "even more"; the delight of gazing upon the ineffable and blessed Countenance of God.

It was narrated that Suhayb said:

"The Messenger of Allah recited this verse: 'For those who have done good is the best (reward) and even more.' Then he said: 'When the people of Paradise enter Paradise, and the people of the Fire enter the Fire, a caller will cry out: "O people of Paradise! You have a covenant with Allah and He wants to fulfill it." They will say: "What is it?" Has Allah not made the Balance (of our good deeds) heavy, and made our faces bright, and admitted us to Paradise and saved us from Hell?" Then the Veil will be lifted and they will look upon Him, and by Allah, Allah will not give them anything that is more beloved to them or delightful, than looking upon Him.'"

— Narrated by Ibn Majah, al-Tirmidhi, and Muslim.

During the lifetime of Muhammad some people asked:

"O Allah's Messenger! Shall we see our Lord on the Day of Resurrection?" The Prophet said: "Do you have any difficulty in seeing the moon on a full moon night?" They said: "No, O Allah's Messenger." He said: "Do you have any difficulty in seeing the sun when there are no clouds?" They said: "No, O Allah's Messenger." He said: "So verily, you would see Him like this (i.e., as easy as you see the sun and the moon in the world when it is clear)."

— Narrated by Al-Bukhari, Muslim, Abu Dawud, and Ibn Majah.

Muhammad said also in an authentic hadith mentioned in Sahih al-Bukhari, Sahih Muslim, Jami' al-Tirmidhi, Sunan Abi Dawud, and Sunan ibn Majah: "Certainly, you will see your Rubb (on the Day of Resurrection) as you see this (full) moon, and you will have no difficulty (or trouble) in seeing Him."

In addition, the Qur'an also confirms in 83:15 that: "No! Indeed, from (the sight and mercy of) their Lord, that Day, they will be veiled/blocked (i.e., on the Day of Judgment, the disbelievers will not be able to see Him)."^{[Quran 83:15]}

Among the most significant Ash'ari-Maturidi theological works are:

- Kitab al-Tawhid by Abu Mansur al-Maturidi (d. 333/944).
- Al-Insaf fima Yajib I'tiqaduh by Abu Bakr al-Baqillani (d. 403/1013).
- A Guide to Conclusive Proofs for the Principles of Belief by Abu al-Ma'ali al-Juwayni (d. 478/1085).
- The Moderation in Belief by Abu Hamid al-Ghazali (d. 505/1111).
- Tabsirat al-Adilla by Abu al-Mu'in al-Nasafi (d. 508/1114).
- Asas al-Taqdis by Fakhr al-Din al-Razi (d. 606/1209).
- The Commentaries on Al-'Aqida al-Tahawiyya.

=== Mu'tazilis ===
The Mu'tazilis reject the anthropomorphic attributes of God because an eternal being "must be unique" and attributes would make God comparable. The descriptions of God in the Quran are considered to be allegories. Nevertheless, the Muʿtazilites thought God contains oneness (tawhid) and justice. Other characteristics like knowledge are not attributed to God; rather they describe his essence. Otherwise eternal attributes of God would give rise to a multiplicity entities existing eternal besides God.

Among the most significant Mu'tazili theological works are:

- Sharh al-Usul al-Khamsa (Explaining the Five Principles) by al-Qadi 'Abd al-Jabbar (d. 415/1025).
- Al-Minhaj fi Usul al-Din (The Curriculum/Method in the Fundamentals of Religion) by al-Zamakhshari (d. 538/1144).

=== Jahmism ===
The Jahmites were an early Islamic denomination who insisted on the absolute incomparability of God and favored Natural theology. The founder Jahm bin Safwan was a major opponent of the Murjite and anthropomoprhist theologian Muqatil ibn Sulayman.

For the Jahmites, God is wholly other and imcomparable, removed from every conceptualization or description by humans. Jahmi derives his doctrine from his epistemology: since all conceptualization are derived from the created world, there is no way to envision God. The lack of attributes to God brought him the accusation of denial of God. However, because everything what happens in this world – including what is done by living beings – are God's actions, Jahmite's concept of God is pervading everything. Still, God is not mixed with creation and the object of worship remains transcendent. Jahms did not deny that the attributes of God are real or a thing, but argues that God is not a thing. Furthermore, Jahm's epistemology is empiricistic not rationalistic. The created world is, for the Jahmites, ultimately unreal, as only God can be considered real. This also sets them apart from the Mu'tazilites.

Due to God's absoluteness, Jahmites adhere to predestination and reject the view that a person has free will and insist that actions are determined by God. The Jahmiyya believed this because they thought that human free will would entail a limitation on God's power, and so must be rejected. Since there is no essence and no self-existence in Jahmite's thought, except for God, the Jahmites also denied the eternity of paradise and hell.

=== Shi'is ===
The Shi'is agreed with the Mu'tazilis and deny that God will be seen with the physical eyes either in this world or in the next.

==== Isma'ilis ====
According to Isma'ilism, God is absolutely transcendent and unknowable; beyond matter, energy, space, time, change, imaginings, intellect, positive as well as negative qualities. All attributes of God named in rituals, scriptures or prayers refers not to qualities God possesses, but to qualities emanated from God, thus these are the attributes God gave as the source of all qualities, but God does not consist on one of these qualities. One philosophical definition of the world Allah is " The Being Who concentrates in Himself all the attributes of perfection " or "the Person Who is the Essential Being, and Who encompasses all the attributes of perfection". Since God is beyond all wordings, Isma'ilism also denies the concept of God as the first cause.

In Ismailism, assigning attributes to God as well as negating any attributes from God (via negativa) both qualify as anthropomorphism and are rejected, as God cannot be understood by either assigning attributes to him or taking attributes away from him. The 10th-century Ismaili philosopher Abu Yaqub al-Sijistani suggested the method of double negation; for example: "God is not existent" followed by "God is not non-existent". This glorifies God from any understanding or human comprehension.

==== Twelvers ====
The Twelver Shi'is believe that God has no shape, no physical hand, no physical leg, no physical body, no physical face. They believe God has no visible appearance. God does not change in time, nor does he occupy a physical place. Under no circumstances, the Shi'is argues, does God change. There is also no time frame regarding God. As support for their view, Shi'i scholars often point to the Qur'anic verse 6:103 which states: "Eyes comprehend Him not, but He comprehends all eyes. He is the All-Subtle (penetrating everything no matter how small), the All-Aware." Thus one fundamental difference between Sunnis and Shi'is that the former believes that followers will "see" their Lord on the Day of Resurrection, while the latter holds that God cannot be seen because he is beyond space and time.

Ibn 'Abbas says that a bedouin once came to the Messenger of Allah and said, "O Messenger of Allah! Teach me of the most unusual of knowledge!" He asked him, "What have you done with the peak of knowledge so that you now ask about its most unusual things?!" The man asked him, "O Messenger of Allah! What is this peak of knowledge?!" He said, "It is knowing Allah as He deserves to be known." The bedouin then said, "And how can He be known as He ought to be?" The Messenger of Allah answered, "It is that you know Him as having no model, no peer, no antithesis, and that He is Wahid (One, Single) and Ahad (Unique, Absolutely One): Apparent yet Hidden, the First and the Last, having no peer nor a similitude; this is the true knowledge about Him."

— Muhammad Baqir al-Majlisi, "Knowing Allah", Bihar al-Anwar

Among the most significant Shi'i theological works are:

- Kitab al-Tawhid (Book of Monotheism) by Ibn Babawayh – also known as al-Shaykh al-Saduq – (d. 381 H/991).
- Tajrid al-I'tiqad (Sublimation of Belief) by Nasir al-Din al-Tusi (d. 672/1274).

=== Sufism ===
The majority of Sufis adhere to the same beliefs and practices of orthodox theology of Sunni Islam, both the Ash'ari and Maturidi schools, the essential difference in theology being that Sufis believe Ma'iyyat Allah (God's presence, togetherness, companionship) – derived from the Qur'anic verse 4 in Surat al-Hadid which states: "and He is with you wheresoever you may be."^{[Quran 57:4 (Translated by Nureddin Uzunoğlu)]} – is not only by knowledge, comprehension and power, but also by nature and essence, which is God himself, being everywhere by presence.

==== Hulul and Ittihad ====
According to Ahmad ibn 'Ajiba (d. 1224/1809) in his al-Bahr al-Madid: Ahl al-Batin (people of the inner knowledge who follow the esoteric interpretation, i.e., the Sufis) have a consensus on that God is everywhere by presence and essence (in all places at once with his entire being despite his spacelessness), but without Hulul (God's indwelling, fusion/infusion, incarnation in creation) and without Ittihad (God's identification, unification, union with creation), unlike Ahl al-Zahir (people of the outward observance; the uninitiated), who are unanimously agreed that God is omnipresent only by knowledge and power.

Among the verses that Sufis rely on to prove God's omnipresence are: 2:115; 2:255 (Ayat al-Kursi); 6:3; 43:84; 57:4; and 58:7. Based on these Qur'anic verses, God's omnipresence is not limited to certain areas, but is present everywhere, all-pervasive, and all-knowing.

According to Muhammad Metwalli al-Sha'rawi (d. 1419/1998) in his interpretation (better known as Tafsir al-Sha'rawi) of the Qur'anic verses 56:83-85, which are mentioned in Surat al-Waqi'ah: "83. Why then (are you helpless) when it (i.e., the soul of a dying person at the moment of death) reaches the throat, 84. While you are looking on, 85. And We (i.e., God and/or His angels) are nearer/closer to him (the dying human) than you are, but you do not see."

Al-Sha'rawi stated that God's statement in verse 56:85 "but you do not see" proves clearly and unequivocally that Ma'iyyatullah (meaning 'companionship of God', literally: 'togetherness with God') is true/real with his essence (dhat), which is not like the essence of created beings, and his companionship is not only with knowledge, if so, then God wouldn't say "but you do not see".

Since God in Islam is transcendental and sovereign but also immanent and omnipresent, the Sufi view holds that in reality, only God exists. Thus everything in creation is reflecting an attribute of God's names. Yet these forms are not God themselves. The Sufi Saint Ibn Arabi stated: There is nothing but God. This statement was mistakenly equalized to Pantheism by critics; however, Ibn Arabi always made a clear distinction between the creation and the creator. Since God is the Absolute Reality, the created worlds and their inhabitants are merely illusions. They just exist because of God's command Kun, but everything that would be, was already known by God.

Both beliefs Hulul (incarnation) and Ittihad (unification) had been severely denounced by moderate Sunni Sufis, such as 'Abd al-Ghani al-Nabulsi (d. 1143/1731), which he described as heresies.

Among the most significant Sufi theological works are:

- Al-Ta'aruf li-Madhhab Ahl al-Tasawwuf (Inquiry into the Tenets of the Sufis) by Abu Bakr al-Kalabadhi (d. 385/995), recognised as an authoritative treatise on the mystical doctrines.
- Al-Risala al-Qushayriyya by al-Qushayri (d. 465/1072).
- Futuh al-Ghayb (Revelations of the Unseen) by 'Abd al-Qadir al-Jilani (d. 561/1166).
- Al-Burhan al-Mu'ayyad (The Advocated Proof) by Ahmad al-Rifa'i (d. 578/1182).

== See also ==
- Al-Ghafūr
- Attributes of God in Islam
- Conceptions of God
- Ethical monotheism
- Existence of God
- God in Abrahamic religions
  - God in the Baháʼí Faith
  - God in Christianity
  - God in Judaism
  - God in Mormonism
  - Jehovah's Witnesses beliefs § God
- Religion in pre-Islamic Arabia

== Bibliography ==
- Al-Bayhaqi (1999), Allah's Names and Attributes, ISCA, ISBN 1-930409-03-6
- Cook, Michael (2024). A History of the Muslim World. Princeton University Press.
- Hulusi, Ahmed (1999), "Allah" as introduced by Mohammed, Kitsan, 10th ed., ISBN 975-7557-41-2
- Muhaiyaddeen, M. R. Bawa (1976), Asmāʼul-Husnā: the 99 beautiful names of Allah, The Bawa Muhaiyaddeen Fellowship, ISBN 0-914390-13-9
- Netton, Ian Richard (1994), Allah Transcendent: Studies in the Structure and Semiotics of Islamic Philosophy, Theology and Cosmology, Routledge, ISBN 0-7007-0287-3
- Salem, Feryal (2016). The Emergence of Early Sufi Piety and Sunnī Scholasticism. Brill. ISBN 978-90-04-31448-1.
- Schock, Cornelia (2016). "Jahm b. Ṣafwān (d. 128/745–6) and the 'Jahmiyya' and Ḍirār b. ʿAmr (d. 200/815)". In Schmidtke, Sabine (ed.). The Oxford Handbook of Islamic Theology. Oxford University Press. pp. 55–80. ISBN 978-0-19-969670-3.
- Suleiman, Farid (2024). Ibn Taymiyya and the Attributes of God. Brill. ISBN 978-90-04-49990-4.
- Williams, Wesley (2002). "Aspects of the Creed of Imam Ahmad ibn Hanbal: A Study of Anthropomorphism in Early Islamic Discourse". International Journal of Middle East Studies. 34 (3): 441–463. doi:10.1017/S0020743802003021.
