= Sufi metaphysics =

Part of Sufi Islamic philosophy

In Islamic philosophy, Sufi metaphysics is centered on the concept of وحدة, waḥdah, 'unity' or توحيد, tawhid. Two main Sufi philosophies prevail on this topic. Wahdat al-wujūd literally means "the Unity of Existence" or "the Unity of Being." Wujūd, meaning "existence" or "presence", here refers to God. On the other hand, waḥdat al-shuhūd, meaning "Apparentism" or "Monotheism of Witness", holds that God and his creation are entirely separate.

Some scholars have claimed that the difference between the two philosophies differ only in semantics and that the entire debate is merely a collection of "verbal controversies" which have come about because of ambiguous language. However, the concept of the relationship between God and the universe is still actively debated both among Sufis and between Sufis and non-Sufi Muslims.

== Waḥdat al-wujūd (unity of existence) ==
The mystical thinker and theologian Abu Saeed Mubarak Makhzoomi discussed the concept of waḥdat al-wujūd in his book Tohfa Mursala. However, the Sufi saint who discussed the ideology of Sufi metaphysics to the greatest depth is Ibn Arabi. He employed the term wujud to refer to God as the "Necessary Being". He also attributed the term to everything other than God, but insisted that wujud does not belong to the things found in the cosmos in any real sense. Rather, the things borrow wujud from God, much as the earth borrows light from the sun.

The issue is how wujūd can rightfully be attributed to the things, also called "entities" (aʿyān). From the perspective of tanzih, Ibn Arabi declared that wujūd belongs to God alone, and, in his famous phrase, the things "have never smelt a whiff of wujud." From the point of view of tashbih (anthropomorphism), he affirmed that all things are wujūd's self-disclosure (tajalli) or self-manifestation (ẓohur). In sum, all things are "He/not He" (howa/lāhowa), which is to say that they are both God and not God, both wujud and not wujud. In his book Fusus al-Hikam, Ibn-e-Arabi states that "wujūd is the unknowable and inaccessible ground of everything that exists. God alone is true wujūd, while all things dwell in nonexistence, so also wujūd alone is nondelimited (muṭlaq), while everything else is constrained, confined, and constricted. Wujūd is the absolute, infinite, nondelimited reality of God, while all others remain relative, finite, and delimited".

Ibn Arabi's doctrine of waḥdat al-wujūd focuses on the esoteric (batin) reality of creatures instead of exoteric (zahir) dimension of reality. Therefore, he interprets that wujud is the one and unique reality from which all reality derives. The external world of sensible objects is but a fleeting shadow of the Real (al-Haqq), God. God alone is the all embracing and eternal reality. Whatever exists is the shadow (tajalli) of the Real and is not independent of God. This is summed up in Ibn Arabi's own words: "Glory to Him who created all things, being Himself their very essence (ainuha)".

To call wujud or Real Being "one" is to speak of the unity of the Essence. In other terms, it is to say that Being—Light in itself—is nondelimited (mutlaq), that is, infinity and absolute, undefined and indefinable, indistinct and indistinguishable. In contrast, everything other than Being—every existent thing (mawjûd)—is distinct, defined, and limited (muqayyad). The Real is incomparable and transcendent, but it discloses itself (tajallî) in all things, so it is also similar and immanent. It possesses such utter nondelimitation that it is not delimited by nondelimitation. "God possesses Nondelimited Being, but no delimitation prevents Him from delimitation. On the contrary, He possesses all delimitations, so He is nondelimited delimitation" On the highest level, wujūd is the absolute and nondelimited reality of God, the "Necessary Being" (wājib al-wujūd) that cannot not exist. In this sense, wujūd designates the Essence of God or of the Real (dhāt al-ḥaqq), the only reality that is real in every respect. On lower levels, wujūd is the underlying substance of "everything other than God" (māsiwāAllāh)—which is how Ibn Arabi and others define the "cosmos" or "universe" (al-ʿālam). Hence, in a secondary meaning, the term wujūd is used as shorthand to refer to the whole cosmos, to everything that exists. It can also be employed to refer to the existence of each and every thing that is found in the universe.

God's 'names' or 'attributes', on the other hand, are the relationships which can be discerned between the Essence and the cosmos. They are known to God because he knows every object of knowledge, but they are not existent entities or ontological qualities, for this would imply plurality in the godhead.

Ibn 'Arabî used the term "effusion" (fayd) to denote the act of creation. His writings contain expressions which show different stages of creation, a distinction merely logical and not actual. The following gives details about his vision of creation in three stages: the Most Holy Effusion (al-fayd al-aqdas), the Holy Effusion (al-fayd al-muqaddas) and the Perpetual Effusion (al-fayd al-mustamirr). Waḥdat al-wujūd spread through the teachings of the Sufis like Qunyawi, Jandi, Tilimsani, Qayshari, Jami etc.

The noted scholar Muhibullah Allahabadi strongly supported the doctrine.

Sachal Sarmast and Bulleh Shah, two Sufi poets from present day Pakistan, were also ardent followers of Waḥdat al-wujūd. It is also associated with the Hamah Ust (Persian meaning "He is the only one") philosophy in South Asia.

=== Tashkīk ===
Tashkīk or gradation is closely associated with the Sadrian interpretation of waḥdat al-wujūd. According to this school, the reality and existence are identical which means existence is one but graded in intensity. This methodology was given a name of tashkik al-wujud and it thus explains that there is gradation of existence that stand in a vast hierarchical chain of being (marāṭib al-wujūd) from floor (farsh) to divine throne (ʿarsh), but the wujūd of each existent māhīyya is nothing but a grade of the single reality of wujūd whose source is God, the absolute being (al-wujūd al-mutlaq). What differentiates the wujūd of different existents is nothing but wujūd in different degrees of strength and weakness. The universe is nothing but different degrees of strengths and weaknesses of wujūd, ranging from intense degree of wujūd of arch-angelic realities, to the dim wujūd of lowly dust from which Adam was made.

== Opposition to wahdat al-wujud ==
Sufi metaphysics has been a subject to criticism by most non-Sufis; in Al-Andalus, where most of the Muslim scholars were either Zahirites or Malikites preferring the Ash'arite creed, Sufi metaphysics was considered blasphemy and its practitioners blacklisted. Followers of the Ash'arite creed in the east were often suspicious of Sufism as well, most often citing Sufi metaphysics as well. Ibn Arabi was influenced by Al Ghazali, who himself was a strong supporter of the Ash'arite creed.

=== Opposition within Sufism ===
As a doctrine, waḥdat al-wujūd was also not without controversy or opposition within the Sufi community, some members of which responded to its conceptual emergence by formulating rival doctrines. One example was waḥdat al-shuhūd, which was formulated by 'Ala' al-Dawla Simnani (1261–1336), and would go on to attract many followers in India, including Ahmed Sirhindi (1564–1624), who provided some of the most widely accepted formulations of this doctrine in the Indian sub-continent. Sirhindi wrote that one should discern the existence of the universe from the absolute and that the absolute does not exist because of existence but because of his essence.

=== Response to criticism ===
Some later Sufis, such as Shah Waliullah Dehlawi (1703–1762), tried to reconcile the doctrines of waḥdat al-wujūd (unity of being) of Ibn Arabi and waḥdat al-shuhūd (unity in conscience) of Sirhindi by downplaying the differences between the two as being based more on terminology than substance.

Sufis in the 19th century, such as Pir Meher Ali Shah and Syed Waheed Ashraf, meanwhile noted that the two concepts only differ in that wahdat-al-wujud states that God and the universe aren't identical.

=== Accusations of pantheism ===
The term wahdat al-wujud as a critical mystical notion was ascribed to Ibn 'Arabi for the first time in the polemics of Ibn Taymiyya (d. 1328), even though he did not employ it in his writings. It is highly controversial among the Wahhabi and Salafi sects of Islam.

They accused Ibn 'Arabi of holding pantheist or monist views incompatible with Islam's pure monotheism. However, according to a number of scholars including al-Sha'rani (d. 573/1565) and 'Abd al-Ra'uf al-Munawi (d. 1031/1621), the books of Ibn 'Arabi have been altered and distorted by some anonymous apostates and heretics, and therefore many sayings and beliefs were attributed to him, which are not true to what he actually wrote.

Proponents of waḥdat al-wujūd such as 'Abd al-Ghani al-Nabulsi, 'Abd al-Ra'uf b. 'Ali al-Fansuri, Seyyed Hossein Nasr, Mir Valiuddin and Titus Burckhardt disagree that waḥdat al-wujūd is identified with pantheism. Nasr, for example, considers the term pantheism and monism as not equivalent to waḥdat al-wujūd. Ideas similar to pantheism existed since the early stages of Islam. Jahm writes that God is "in heaven, on earth and in every place; there is no place where He is not (...)" and "He is in everything, neither contiguous nor separated.", a position attacked by Ahmad ibn Hanbal.

== Wahdat al-mawjud ==
In Islamic philosophy, wahdat al-mawjud is the concept of the intrinsic unity of all created things. The concept can be viewed as analogous or related to pantheism insofar as it does not account for any separation between the divine and the material world.

=== Origin ===
Some believe that wahdat al-mawjud originates from Greek philosophy, such as Heraclitus' assertion that "God is day and night, winter and summer, many and little, solid and liquid."

=== Relation to wahdat al wujud ===
It is sometimes viewed as the opposite of wahdat al-wujud, which frames God as the only true reality, and the material universe as an illusion emanating from God. It is sometimes described as the concept that existence moves towards spiritual oneness, but remains plural. Under this understanding, human beings can become al-Insān al-Kāmil (achieve perfection) and attain the wisdom of God.

Others assert that wahdat al-wujud and wahdat al-mawjud are identical.

=== Al Hallaj ===
Some associate the concept with Mansur al Hallaj's statement "Anā al-Haqq" (I am the Truth).

=== Sheikh Siti Jenar ===
Sheikh Siti Jenar or Sunan Lemah Abang is, according to the Babad Tanah Jawi ("History of the land of Java") manuscripts, one of the nine Wali Sanga ("Nine Saints") to whom Indonesian legend attributes the establishment of Islam as the dominant religion among the Javanese.

His teaching of manunggaling kawula gusti (union of man and God) gained opposition from Wali Sanga and the Sultanate of Demak.

== See also ==
- Abu Saeed Mubarak Makhzoomi
- Ahmad ibn Hanbal – Muslim scholar, jurist, and theologian (780–855)
- Al Akbariyya (Sufi school)
- Aqeedah
- Emanationism
- God Speaks: The Theme of Creation and Its Purpose – 1955 book by Meher Baba
- God's throne in Islam
- Jahm bin Safwan – Islamic theologian (c.696–c.745 CE)
- Illuminationist philosophy
- Sheikh Bedreddin – Mystic and revolutionary (1359–1420)
- Shirk (Islam)
- Sufi cosmology
- Sufi-Salafi relations
- Sultan Bahoo
- Universal mind
- Univocity of being
- Advaita Vedanta
- Anal Haq
- Aham Brahmasmi
