= Bila Kayf =

Arabic phrase

The Arabic phrase Bila Kayf, also pronounced as Bila Kayfa, (Arabic: بلا كيف, romanized: bi-lā kayfa, lit. 'with-no (without) how') is roughly translated as "without asking how", "without knowing how", or "without modality", and refers to the belief that the verses of the Qur'an with an "unapparent meaning" should be accepted as they have come without saying how they are meant or what is meant, i.e. not attributing a specific meaning to them. Literally, the phrase is translated as "without how" but figuratively as "in a manner that suits His majesty and transcendence".

Bila Kayf was a way of resolving theological problems in Islam in āyāt (verses of the Quran) by accepting without questioning. This approach was applied to a variety of questions in Islamic theology, including on traditions relating to the anthropomorphism and corporealism of God, as well as on others involved in the doctrine of the createdness of the Quran.

== Anthropomorphism and corporealism ==
An example of a use of this approach is with regards to verses in the Quran and in hadith that use anthropomorphic and corporeal language to describe God. The attribution, in such texts, of a "hand" or "face" of God have been approached by some in a manner that seeks to accept such statements but without applying any consideration about what they may mean, Bila Kayf. In this context, Al-Ash'ari, the founder of the Ash'arism, originated the use of the term and concept of Bila Kayf in formulating his approach to such statements.

Another source credits Ahmad ibn Hanbal, founder of the Hanbali school of fiqh (Islamic jurisprudence) as the original creator of the doctrine.

== See also ==
- Tanzih
- Biblical literalism
- Bibliolatry
- Superstitions in Muslim societies
- Quranic inerrancy
