= Attributes of God in Islam =

The essence and attributes of God; what they are, what they include, whether the attributes are the same as the essence or different from it, whether they have a real existence, whether they can change, etc. are a series of understandings and discussions developed by definition in Islamic theology. These discussions took shape in a transitional period around anthropomorphism and corporealism regarding the attributes of God, and discussions of the creation of the Quranic createdness were added to this.

== Background ==
Islamic debates about the ontological reality of divine attributes post-date Quranic theology and find their background in Christian debates and discussions about the nature of the Trinity, in a manner asserted explicitly by Mu'tazilites as well as earlier Jewish sources, who often mention the two subjects in conjunction with one another. Basic terminology from philosophical works on the Trinity were carried over (especially in describing an attribute as a maʿnā or ṣifah), as well as the initial list of attributes or properties ascribed to God in Islamic works (including "existence", "generosity", "life", "wisdom"/"knowledge"/"reason", "power" and more).

Early Mu'tazilite arguments against the distinct ontological reality of the attributes ultimately come from the writings of the philosopher Philo of Alexandria, mediated by the works of the Church Fathers into the Islamic milieu, including the two arguments that (1) anything eternal itself is a god and (2) that God's oneness and unity excludes any sort of composition, which would include a multiplicity of distinct and real attributes.

== Definitions ==
The "attribute" (ṣifa) itself has been defined or understood in a few ways. The Sunni theologian Al-Baqillani defined the attribute as follows in his Tamhīd:

The attribute/quality (ṣifa) is the thing that is in (the being) to which it is attributed (or: in the qualified being; bi-l-mawṣūf) or to which it belongs, and that lets it acquire the attribution/qualification (yuksibuhu l-wasf), that is, the qualificative (naʿt) deriving from the attribute/quality (ṣifa).

Thus, Al-Baqillani believed that an important aspect of God's attributes is that they not only existed, but that they resided in God. Likewise, Al-Maturidi said the attributes subsistent in God's essence (bi-dhātihi). Al-Ghazali offered three criteria that apply to attributes: attributes are not God's essence but in fact are distinguishable from it (zāʾida ʿalā l-dhāt); attributes subsist in the essence of God (qāʾima bi-dhātihi); attributes are pre-eternal (qadīma).

== General approach ==
In Islamic theology, the attributes (ṣifāt, also meaning "property" or "quality") of God can be defined in one of two ways. Under divine simplicity, the attributes of God are verbal descriptions understood apophatically (negatively). God being "powerful" does not impute a distinct quality of "power" to God's essence but is merely to say that God is not weak. This view was held by the Mu'tazila and prominent Islamic philosophers like Ibn Sina (Avicenna) to preserve the notion of God's oneness (tawḥīd) and reject any multiplicity within God. Under the now more widespread view, attributes represent ontologically real and distinct properties or qualities that God has.

The relationship between the attributes of God and God's essence or nature has been understood in different ways. At one end of the spectrum, the Jahmiyya rejected the existence of God's attributes at all to maintain their understanding of God's transcendence (tanzih), in what has been called "divesting" God of attributes (ta'til). This is put in opposition to those who "support the attributes" (al-ṣifātiyya). Advocates of divine simplicity, like the Mu'tazilites, held that God's attributes are identical to God's essence and amount to mere verbal descriptions of God. Sunnism accepted the view that the attributes of God are distinct and ontologically real, and identified both Jahmites and Mu'tazilites as deniers of God's attributes. Within the Sunni paradigm, Al-Maturidi held that God's attributes collectively comprise God's nature. Later, and what would become the classical view of Islamic theology, held instead that God has an eternal nature or essence and that the attributes of God, separate from this essence, are predicated or superadded onto it. The difference between the former and the latter, among those affirming the ontological reality of God's attributes, can be understood as a version of bundle theory versus substrate attribute theory.

Beginning with the Mu'tazila, God's attributes have been divided into attributes of essence (ṣifāt al-dhāt) and attributes of action (ṣifāt al-fiʿl). Essential attributes cannot be true both positively and negatively of God: God cannot be both powerful and weak, making "powerful" an essential attribute. God can both be approving and disapproving, making God's approving-ness an attribute of action. In addition, whereas God's essential attributes originate in God's essence, his attributes of action originate in relations with his creations. Not all Muslims accepted this: Al-Maturidi argued that attributes of action are also eternal and substituent in God's essence. Eastern Hanafis rejected a distinction between attributes of essence and action entirely.

== Attributes ==
=== Number of attributes ===
Tradition varied regarding the number of God's attributes. Some believed that they were numerically unlimited. Others related them to the names of God. Based on the belief that God had ninety-nine names, so too were there ninety-nine attributes. Al-Ash'ari defined eight essential attributes (Power, Knowledge, Life, Will, Hearing, Sight, Speech, and Enduringness).

=== Attribute of the Essence ===
The Attribute of the Essence (ṣifat al-dhāt)), referred to by some modern historians as "the potential attribute par excellence," and by some traditional sources as "God's most proper attribute" (akhaṣṣ ṣifātih, ṣifat Allāh al-akhaṣṣ), is possessed by all things, and is an attribute that serves to distinguish between a thing and something other than it. It is the essence of the thing, "the way it is in itself" (mā huwa ʿalayhī fī ḍātihī). It is irreducible, cannot be derived from or conditioned on anything else, and is not subject to explanation. The essence is that which one predicates things, and cannot itself be predicated on anything else. Damien Janos describes it:

The Attribute of the Essence, which is variously called ṣifat al-dhāt, ṣifat al-nafs, and ṣifa dhātiyya in the Arabic primary sources, refers to what a thing is in itself, or rather to what a class (jins) of things is in itself (such as atoms). That is to say that, unlike in the case of other attributes, a thing is never devoid of or separated from its Attribute of the Essence. This special attribute also differentiates that class from other classes of things (say atoms from instances of blackness).

Various sources discussed how the Attribute of the Essence may relate to oneness or existence. In some Mu'tazilite sources, a relationship was believed to exist between this attribute and oneness. The Attribute of the Essence explained similarities between members of the same class and differences between members of different classes. As members of a class share fundamental properties, there is a kind of oneness that these members share as well. Hence, sameness and essential oneness emerges from members sharing the same Attribute of the Essence. Furthermore, any members that share the same Attribute of the Essence also share all other essential attributes. Furthermore, some Mu'tazilite sources defined or equated the Attribute of the Essence, variously, with the essential attribute of "eternality" (qidam) or "God's being eternal" (kawnuh qadīm) or as "divinity" (ilāhiyya), as these texts thought these attributes were the most apt for designating God's essence.

=== Oneness ===
God's oneness refers to God's indivisibility and uniqueness (as there is no second God), the latter insofar as God's essential attributes are not shared by any other being or entity.

Among Islamic thinkers, many disagreements existed over how God's oneness related to God's essence, whether it was an attribute, and if it was an attribute, if it was a positive or negative attribute. Generally, the Mu'tazilites equated oneness, just like all of God's other attributes, with God's essence. One subset of the Mu'tazilites known as the Bahshamiyya (the group of Mu'tazilites who trace themselves to Abu Hashim al-Jubba'i) appear to have, based on some evidence, described oneness as an attribute of God. However, whether it was a "positive" or "negative" attribute depended on the context or the view of the given author. Some described it as a positive attribute, that is an affirmation of a constructive statement about God, with respect to the uniqueness of God (regarding God's essential attributes), but a negative attribute with respect to the indivisibility of God, making it merely a negation of the claim that there is a second to God, or that it constitutes "denying a second" (nafy al-thānī). For Ash'arites, especially those that came after Ibn Sina, God's oneness was the negative attribute (ṣifāt salbiyya) par excellence of God.

=== "Neither Him, nor other than Him" ===
To differentiate themselves from the Mu'tazila who equated God or God's essence with his attributes, many thinkers, beginning with Ibn Kullab (d. 855 AD), came to argue that the attributes of God were neither identical with God (nafsuhu) but they were also not something other than God (ghayruhu). The idea of this was to reject the Mu'tazilite view that God's attributes were reducible to a description (wasf) of God, but, at the same time, to reject the Mu'tazilite contention that the affirmation of God's attributes as real entities would lead one to posit that there are, in addition to or other than God, eternal existents.

This perspective was encapsulated into a popular phrase that spoke of God's attributes as "neither Him, nor other than Him" (lā huwa wa-lā ghayra huwa). In some versions of the saying, "Him" (huwa) was replaced with "His essence" (dhātuhu). At first, this phrase was understood in relationship to the idea that God's attributes comprised God's essence, but as the generally accepted view because that God's attributed were predicated onto God's essence, this phrase came to be understood to reflect this idea instead. Mu'tazilite's criticized this phrase as being in violation of basic logic (particularly in violation of the law of excluded middle), but the response from Al-Saffar, a Maturidi theologian, was that the law of excluded middle does not apply to God. Most Sunni commentators claimed that there was no violation of the law of the excluded middle, as the meaning of "ghayr" is not strictly "other", in the sense of meaning the opposite of "identical", but rather "wholly independent of", and thus that the phrase simply means that God's attributes are not Him, nor independent of Him.

== Faith sects ==
=== Mu'tazilism ===
The Mu'tazila have argued that there is an identity or equivalence between attribute (ṣifa), description (waṣf), and name (ism) of God. For the Mu'tazila, this was important, to avoid creating any multiplicity within God in the form of a plural number of distinct, ontologically real attributes that are not identical to God. Such an approach would result in a compromise of pure monotheism. In like manner, to avoid the idea that the Quran eternally existed alongside but separately from God (thought to lead to the same problem), the Mu'tazila asserted the doctrine of the createdness of the Quran.

=== Ash'arism ===
Al-Ash'ari, the founder of the Ash'ari school of Islamic theology, argued that, among the essential or divine attributes, some of them can be known through reason (ṣifāt ʿaqliyya) whereas others cannot and can only be known through revelation instead (ṣifāt khabariyya). Al-Ash'ari said that eight attributes can be known by reason:

- mawjūd (existent), or bāqin (everlasting), or wāḥid (one)
- ḥayy (living)
- qādir (powerful)
- ʿalīm (knowing)
- murīd (willing)
- mutakallim (speaking)
- samīʿ (hearing)
- baṣīr (seeing)

The six essential attributes that depend on revelation are:

- yadān (two hands, counting as two attributes)
- ʿaynān (two eyes, counting as two attributes)
- wajh (face)
- janb (side)

Finally, Al-Ash'ari claimed that there were four attributes of action:

- istiwāʾ (rising) over His throne
- ityān (approaching)
- nuzūl (descending)
- majīʾ (coming)

Al-Ash'ari's initial views evolved in later years of Ash'ari thinking. The essential attributes that can be known from reason were reduced from eight to seven, excluding existence from Al-Ash'ari's list, as existence was argued by, for example, Al-Juwayni, to not be an attribute per se but simply that which is identical to God's essence. By analogy, while an atom may have a property of occupancy, as occupancy is additional to the atom, it does not have a property of existence, because existence is not additional to the atom: the existence of the atom is itself the atom.

Another change resulted from the influence of Mu'tazilism and the falsafa tradition. Al-Ash'ari's attributes of revelation and action came to be interpreted figuratively (to avoid anthropomorphic views) by the likes of Al-Juwayni, Al-Ghazali, and Al-Razi. Al-Ash'ari did have a few conservative successors in this regard though, including Al-Baqillani and Al-Bayhaqi.

=== Shia Islam ===
In Twelver Shi'ism, God is described by a combination of positive and negative properties. The eight positive attributes of God are that God is (1) eternal (qadim) (2) omnipotent (qadir) (3) omniscient (ʿalim) (4) alive (hayy) (5) independent in action (murid) (6) aware (mudrik) (7) speaks (mutakallim) (8) and Truth (sadiq). The eight negative attributes are that God is not (1) made of material (murakkab) (2) made of a body (jism) (3) subject to place (makan) (4) dependent (muhtaj) (5) seen (marʾi) (6) subject to change (mahal hawadith) (7) having partners (sharik) (8) incarnated into anything or anybody (hulul). Some lists, in place of the negative attribute of sharik, instead list sifat zaʾidah, meaning that God does not have any added qualities, or that God's qualities are not separate from God's nature.

== Divine simplicity ==
The doctrine of divine simplicity entails that God’s essence is devoid of any form of multiplicity. Avicenna, for instance, argues that God being composed of parts would entail that God is contingent on those parts and, in turn, these parts would enjoy a hierarchical priority over God. However, it is inconceivable that a necessary being should depend on components that are ontologically prior to that being.

== See also ==
- Attributes of God in Christianity
- Names of God in Christianity
