= Throne of God in Islam =

Al-ʽArsh (Arabic: العرش, romanized: Al-ʿArsh, lit. 'The Throne') is the throne of God in Islamic theology. It is believed to be the largest of all the creations of God.

The Throne of God has figured in extensive theological debates across Islamic history with respect to the question of the anthropomorphism and corporealism of God. Some schools argue that it is metaphorical while others argue that it is a literal reality and creation of God. It generally represents God's divine majesty (Al-Jalal), power, and sovereign dominion over the cosmos as king. As Al Jalalayn says in his tafsir of Quran 7:54, "then presided upon the Throne a presiding befitting of Him al-‘arsh ‘throne’ in the classical language is the elevated seat on which a king sits."

In Islamic cosmology and mythology, the Heavens span in a dome-like structure over the earths, arranged in horizontal layers one upon another. At top stands the Throne of God (Al-ʽArsh) separated from the seven heavens below. The lowest heaven is often associated with a firmly-enclosed water of a celestial ocean. Below the Heavens follow the seven earths. The earths are likewise also part of the supernatural cosmos and serve as gradual stages of hell. The surface is inhabited by humans, the lower stages are the abode of destructive winds and jinn, followed by brimstones of hell, scorpions and vipers, and eventually the devils at the bottom.

== Quran ==
The Quran mentions the throne some 25 times (33 times as Al-ʽArsh), such as in verse 10:3 and 23:116:

Surely your Lord is Allah Who created the heavens and the earth in six Days, then subjugated the Throne, conducting every affair. None can intercede except by His permission. That is Allah—your Lord, so worship Him ˹alone˺. Will you not then be mindful?

— Surah Yunus 10:3

Exalted is Allah, the True King! There is no god ˹worthy of worship˺ except Him, the Lord of the Honourable Throne.

— Surah Al-Mu'minun 23:116

The Quran depicts the angels as carrying the throne of God (Surah Ghafir 40:7) and praising his glory (Surah Az-Zumar 39:75).

The Ayat al-Kursi (often glossed as "Verse of the footstool"), is a verse from Al-Baqara, the second sura of the Quran. It references the Kursi (كرسي) which is different from the Throne (عرش), and also God's greatest name, Al-Hayy Al-Qayyoom ("The Living, the Eternal").

== Hadith ==
=== Sunni ===
Sunni prophetic hadith say that the Throne is above the roof of Al-Firdaus Al-'Ala, the highest level of Paradise where God's closest and most beloved servants in the hereafter shall dwell.

Sunni scholars of hadith have stated that Islamic prophet Muhammad said the reward for reciting Ayatul Kursi after every prayer is Paradise, and that reciting it is a protection from the devil.

== Characteristics ==
- Its breadth has been described as the Seven Heavens is like a ring in a desert in relation to the Kursi or the footstool of God, and likewise the Kursi is like a ring in a desert in relation to "the Throne", On the authority of Abu Dharr al-Ghifari, he said:

I said to the Prophet: O Messenger of God, whatever has been revealed to you is greater. He said: Ayat al-Kursi, then he said: O Abu Dharr, what are the seven heavens with the Kursi except like a ring thrown into a desert land, and the preference of the Throne over the Chair is like the preference of the desert over the ring.

- The Throne is the highest of all creatures, and it was primarily on the water. The Quran says:
  …and His Throne was upon the waters.
  — Surah Hud 11:7
  and on the authority of Abdullah ibn Masud he said:
  The distance between the highest heaven and the world is five hundred years, and between the Kursi and the water as well, and the Throne is above the water, and God is the subjugater of the Throne, nothing of your deeds is hidden from Him.

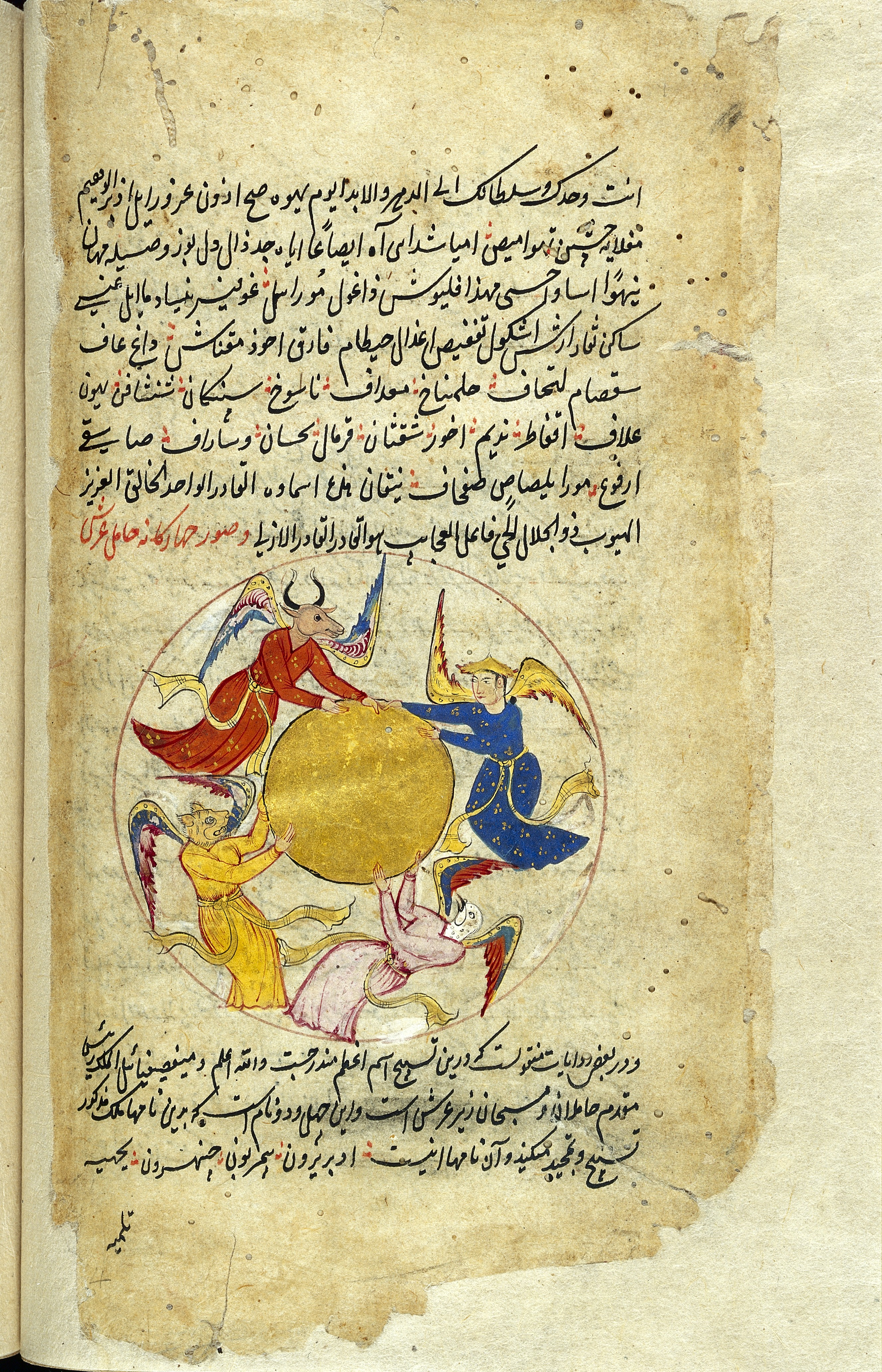
The four supporters (angels) of the celestial throne

== Bearers of the Throne ==
Bearers of the Throne or ḥamlat al-ʽarsh (حملة العرش) are a group of angels in Islam. The Quran mentions them in 40:7 and 69:17. Other hadiths describes them with six wings and four faces. While according to a hadith transmitted from At-Targhib wat-Tarhib authored by ʻAbd al-ʻAẓīm ibn ʻAbd al-Qawī al-Mundhirī, the bearers of the throne were angels who shaped like a rooster, with their feet on the earth and their nape supporting the Throne of God in the highest sky. (Note: The hadith were: "...Allah, the most exalted, has permitted me to speak of a rooster whose legs have separated the earth, and its neck is bent under the throne..." through the narration of Abu Hurairah by Abd al-Qawi al-Mundhiri through Al-Qadi Abu Ya'la. The hadith were judged as authentic and sound by numerous hadith scholars such as by Nur al-Din al-Haythami in his work, Majma al-Zawa'id, Al-Tabarani in his work, Al-Mu'jam al-Awsat, Mustafa al-Adawi in Sahih Al-Ahadith Al-Qudsi and also by Muhammad Nasiruddin al-Albani in his work Silsalat al-Hadith as-Sahihah It also commented as safe as it is also supported by other hadith from another chain from Jabir ibn Abd Allah in the Sunan Abu Dawood.) a number modern Islamic scholars from Imam Mohammad Ibn Saud Islamic University , and other institutes Yemen and Mauritania also agreed the soundness of this hadith by quoting the commentary from Ibn Abi al-Izz who supported this narrative.

These four angels are also held to be created from different elements: One from light, one from fire, one from water and one from mercy. It is also said they are so large that a journey from their earlobes to their shoulders would take seven hundred years. According to various Islamic tafsir scholars which compiled by Islamic University of Madinah and Indonesian religious ministry, the number of these angels will be added from four into eight angels during the Day of Resurrection. This interpretation were based on Qur'an chapter Surah Al-Haqqa 69:17.

According to Al-Suyuti who quoted a hadith which transmitted by Ibn al-Mubarak, archangel Israfil is one of the bearer of the throne.

== Views ==
=== Sufi ===
Diagram of "Plain of Assembly" (Ard al-Hashr) on the Day of Judgment, from an autograph manuscript of Futuhat al-Makkiyya by Sufi mystic and Muslim philosopher Ibn Arabi, ca. 1238. Shown are the ʽArsh, pulpits for the righteous (al-Aminun), seven rows of angels, Gabriel (al-Ruh), A'raf (the Barrier), the Pond of Abundance, al-Maqam al-Mahmud (the Praiseworthy Station; where Muhammad will stand to intercede for the faithful), Mizan (the Scale), As-Sirāt (the Bridge), Jahannam (Hell), and Marj al-Jannat (Meadow of Paradise).

Sufi Muslims believe God created the throne as a sign of his power and not as place of dwelling.

Abu Mansur al-Baghdadi (d. 429/1037) in his al-Farq bayn al-Firaq (The Difference between the Sects) reports that 'Ali ibn Abi Talib, said: "God created the Throne as an indication of His power, not for taking it as a place for Himself." The vast majority of Islamic scholars, including Sunnis (Ash'aris, Maturidis and Sufis), Mu'tazilis, and Shi'is (Twelvers and Isma'ilis) believe the Throne (Arabic: العرش al-'Arsh) as a symbol of God's power and authority and not as a dwelling place for Himself, others describe it as an allegory, and many others said that the heart of the believer is the Throne of God (قلب المؤمن عرش الله), a quote criticized by Salafi Muslim scholars.

=== Salafi ===
Some Islamic sects, such as the Karramis and the Salafis believe that God has created it as a place of dwelling.

== See also ==
- Throne of God
- Throne Verse
