= Ash'arism =

Sunni school of Islamic theology

Ash'ari theology (Arabic: الأَشْعَرِيَّة, romanized: al-ʾAshʿarīyya) is a school of theology in Sunni Islam named after Abu al-Hasan al-Ash'ari, a Sunni jurist, reformer (mujaddid), and scholastic theologian, in the 9th–10th century. It established an orthodox guideline, based on scriptural authority, rationality, and theological rationalism. The disciples of the Ash'ari school are known as Ash'arites, and the school is also referred to as the Ash'arite school. Ash'ari theology is considered one of the orthodox creeds of Sunni Islam, alongside the Athari and Maturidi.

Al-Ash'ari established a middle way between the doctrines of the Athari and Mu'tazila schools of Islamic theology, based both on reliance on the sacred scriptures of Islam and theological rationalism concerning the agency and attributes of God. Ash'arism eventually became the predominant school of theological thought within Sunni Islam, and is regarded as the single most important school of Islamic theology in the history of Islam.

Amongst the most famous Ashʿarite theologians are al-Nawawi, Ibn Hajar al-Asqalani, Ibn al-Jawzi, al-Ghazali, al-Suyuti, Izz al-Din ibn 'Abd al-Salam, Fakhr al-Din al-Razi, Ibn 'Asakir, al-Subki, al-Taftazani, al-Baqillani, and al-Bayhaqi. Scholars and scientists who were affiliated with the Ash'ari school included al-Biruni, Ibn al-Haytham, Ibn al-Nafis, Ibn Battuta, and Ibn Khaldun. Avicenna has written critique of Ash'arism on various accounts, notably his philosophical theology, his logic and his physics and vice versa.

== History ==
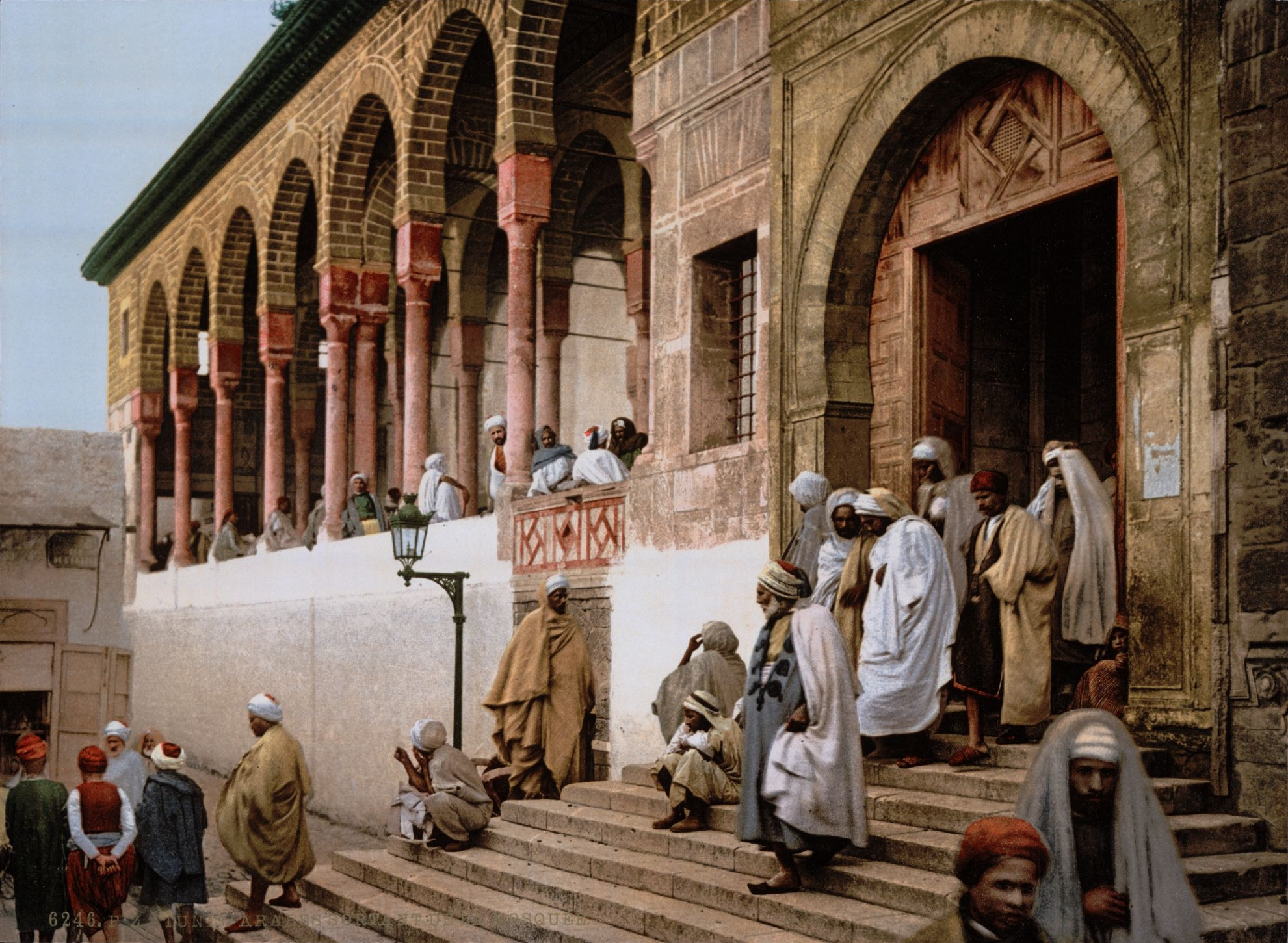
Al-Zaytuna Mosque in Tunis, one of the most important centers of Islamic learning that contributed to the dissemination of Ashʿarī thought in the Maghreb

=== Founder ===
Abu al-Hasan al-Ash'ari was born in Basra, Iraq, and was a descendant of Abu Musa al-Ash'ari, which belonged to the first generation of Muhammad's closest companions (sahaba). As a young man, he studied under al-Jubba'i, a renowned teacher of Mu'tazilite theology and philosophy. He was noted for his teachings on atomism, among the earliest Islamic philosophies, and for al-Ash'ari this was the basis for propagating the view that God created every moment in time and every particle of matter. He nonetheless believed in free will and predestination, elaborating the thoughts of Dirar ibn 'Amr and Abu Hanifa into a "dual agent" or "acquisition" (iktisab) account of free will.

While al-Ash'ari opposed the views of the rival Mu'tazilite school, he was also opposed to the view which rejected all debate, held by certain schools such as the Zahiri ("literalist"), Mujassimite (anthropotheist), schools for their over-emphasis on taqlid (imitation) in his Istihsan al‑Khaud. Instead, al-Ash'ari affirmed the ambiguous verses in the Qur'an (such as those about the hand and eyes) without a "how" (modality) and without a meaning (meaning, he consigned the meaning to God), a practice known as tafwid. He also allowed another orthodox way of dealing with the ambiguous verses in the Qur'an called ta'wil (interpretation based on the Arabic language and revelation). In Istihsan al‑Khaud, al-Ash'ari wrote:

A section of the people (i.e., the Zahirites and others) made capital out of their own ignorance; discussions and rational thinking about matters of faith became a heavy burden for them, and, therefore, they became inclined to blind faith and blind following (taqlid). They condemned those who tried to rationalize the principles of religion as 'innovators'. They considered discussion about motion, rest, body, accident, colour, space, atom, the leaping of atoms, and Attributes of God, to be an innovation and a sin. They said that had such discussions been the right thing, the Prophet and his Companions would have definitely done so; they further pointed out that the Prophet, before his death, discussed and fully explained all those matters which were necessary from the religious point of view, leaving none of them to be discussed by his followers; and since he did not discuss the problems mentioned above, it was evident that to discuss them must be regarded as an innovation.

=== Development ===
Ash'arism became the main school of early Islamic philosophy whereby it was initially based on the foundations laid down by al-Ash'ari, who founded the Ash'arite school in the 10th century based on the methodology taught to him by the Kullabi movement that used rational argumentation to defend Sunni creed. However, the Ash'arite school underwent many developments throughout history, resulting in the term Ash'ari being extremely broad in its modern usage (e.g., differences between Ibn Furak (d. AH 406) and al-Bayhaqi (d. AH 384)).

For example, the Ash'arite view was that comprehension of the unique nature and characteristics of God were beyond human capability. The solution proposed by al-Ash'ari to solve the problems of tashbih and ta'til concedes that the Supreme Being possesses in a real sense the divine attributes and names mentioned in the Qur'an. In so far as these names and attributes have a positive reality, they are distinct from the essence, but nevertheless they do not have either existence or reality apart from it.

The inspiration of al-Ash'ari in this matter was on the one hand to distinguish essence and attribute as concepts, and on the other hand to see that the duality between essence and attribute should be situated not on the quantitative but on the qualitative level—something which Mu'tazilite thinking had failed to grasp. Ash'arite theologians were referred to as the muthbita ("those who make firm") by the Muʿtazilites.

== Beliefs ==
Two popular sources for Ash'ari creeds are Maqalat al-Islamiyyin and Ibana'an Usul al-Diyana.

=== God and God's attributes ===
Ash'arites also hold beliefs about God's attributes that are unique to them, such as:

- Existence;
- Permanence without beginning;
- Endurance without end;
- Absoluteness and independence;
- Dissimilarity to created things;
- Oneness;
- God is all-powerful, willful, knowing, living, seeing, hearing, and speaking (signifying attributes).
- Belief in the visibility of God on Judgment Day is an obligatory Ash'ari belief. The Ash'ari Creed further states that "God will be seen without resemblance [to anything else]"

=== God and relationship with humans ===
The Ashʿarī school of Islamic theology holds that:

- God is all-powerful (omnipotent).
- Good is what God commands—as revealed in the Qur'an and the hadith—and is by definition just; evil is what God forbids and is likewise unjust. Right and wrong are in no way determined intuitively or naturally, they are not objective realities. (Divine command theory)
- Because of Divine omnipotence, there are no "natural laws" (of things like thermodynamics or gravity), because such laws would put limitations on His actions. There are, however, Divine "customs", whereby "certain so-called 'effects'" usually follow certain "causes" in the natural world.
- Also because of Divine power, all human acts—even the decision to raise a finger—are created by God. This had caused controversy earlier in Islamic history because human acts are what humans are judged for when being sent to heaven (jannah) or hell (jahannam). Ash'aris reconciled the doctrines of free will, justice, and divine omnipotence, with their own doctrine of kasb ("acquisition"), by which human beings "acquire" responsibility for their actions, although these "actions are willed and created by God". Humans still possess free will (or, more accurately, freedom of intention) under this doctrine, although their freedom is limited to the power to decide between the given possibilities God has created. (This doctrine is now known in Western philosophy as occasionalism.)
- God has created time as a framework for the creation of other things, but he is not limited by it. Duration is dependent on God, yet it is independent and subsists by itself. God is exalted above space and time, and both space and time originate from God.
- The Qur'an is the uncreated word of God, that is, it was not created by God, but like God has always been. It can also be said to be created when it takes on a form in letters or sound.
- The unique nature and attributes of God cannot be understood fully by human reason and the physical senses.
- Reason is God-given and must be employed over the source of knowledge.
- Intellectual inquiry is decreed by the Quran and the Islamic prophet Muhammad, therefore the interpretation (tafsir) of the Quran and the hadith should keep developing with the aid of older interpretations.
- Only God knows the heart, who belongs to the faithful and who does not.
- God has "absolute freedom" to "punish or reward as He wills", and so may forgive the sins of those in Hell.
- Support of kalam (rationalistic Islamic theology).

=== Prophets and the unseen ===
Ash'arites further affirm that Muslims beliefs include:

- In all the prophets and messengers of Islam, from Adam to Muhammad.
- Jesus will return to earth and defeat the Dajjal.
- Belief in the angels.
- Including the angels of the grave (Munkar and Nakir).
- That Satan tempts man, contrarily to the Mu'tazila and Jahmiyya (the mention of the latter two branches only appears in Ibana).
- The reality of Paradise and Hell.
- That prayers for dead Muslims and almsgiving reach them.
- During sleep, visions can be seen and they have an interpretation ("interpretation" only found in Ibana).
- The existence of sorcerers and that magic is a reality in the world.
- That jinn are real and able to physically possess people, although not mentioned in the works above, many Ash'arites consider this as part of the aqida.

== Ash'arism and reason ==
It is said that in the early period, Ash'arites followed a method that combined reason and revelation. This is in contrast to the assertion by some Ash'arites that those who believe without thinking (muqallidun) cannot be true believers. This view indicates that believing in religion without using reason and thought is considered invalid according to them.

Contrary to this, some within the school, such as al-Taftazani, have sometimes stated that revelation also represents knowledge, while Ibn al-Tilimsani criticized al-Razi, asking what grounds legal rulings if all revelation were mere conjecture, stating that revelation cannot entirely be based on conjecture.

== Later Ash'arism ==
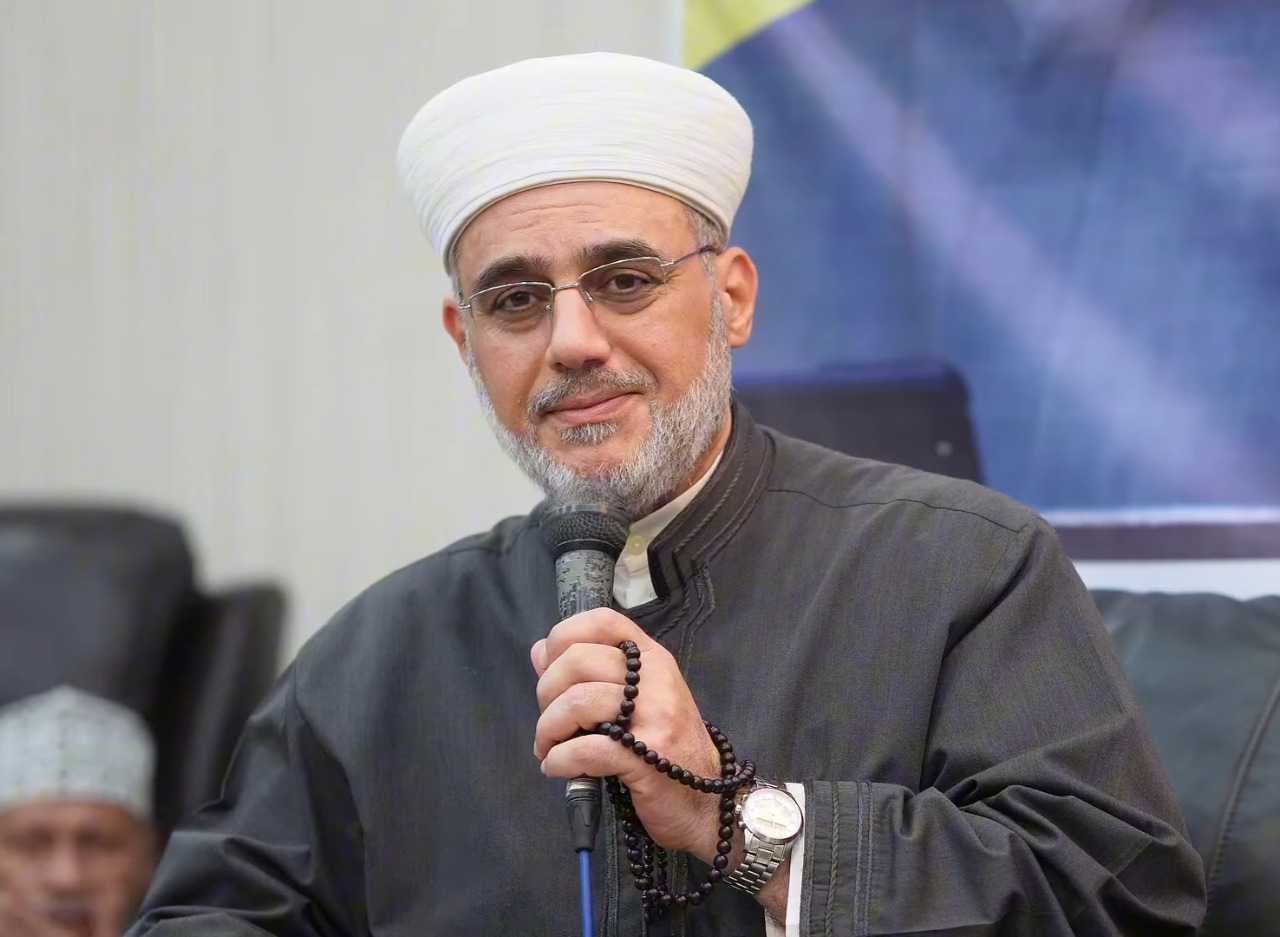
Sa'id Foudah, a leading contemporary Ash'ari scholar of kalam (Islamic systematic theology)

Nicholas Heer writes that later Ash'arite theologians "increasingly attempted to rationalize Islamic doctrine" from about the 12th century onwards. Theologians such as al-Taftazani and al-Jurjani argued that the Islamic sacred scriptures (the Qur'an and the hadith) "must be proven to be true by rational arguments" before being "accepted as the basis of the religion". Educated Muslims "must be convinced on the basis of rational arguments". A series of rational proofs were developed by these Ash'arite theologians, including proofs for "the following doctrines or propositions":

1. The universe is originated;
2. The universe has an originator or creator;
3. The creator of the universe is knowing, powerful and willing;
4. Prophecy is possible;
5. Miracles are possible;
6. Miracles indicate the truthfulness of one who claims to be a prophet;
7. Muhammad claimed to be a prophet and performed miracles.

== Criticism ==
The medieval Muslim scholar Ibn Taymiyyah criticised the Ash'ari theology as (in the words of one historian, Jonathan A. C. Brown) "a Greek solution to Greek problems" that should "never" have concerned Muslims. Both Ibn Taymiyyah and Shah Waliullah Dehlawi rejected the lack of literalism in Ash'ari but later Ibn Taymiyya wrote in his book Majmu' al-Fatawa that Abu al-Hasan al-Ash'ari turned away from the Mu'tazilite creed and came back to the creed of Ahl al-Sunnah which shows the unity in Ahl al-Sunnah wa al-Jammah." In contrast, German orientalist scholar Eduard Sachau says that the Ash'ari theology and its biggest defender, al-Ghazali, was too literal and responsible for the decline of Islamic science starting in the 10th century. Sachau stated that the two clerics were the only obstacle to the Muslim world becoming a nation of "Galileos, Keplers, and Newtons".

Ziauddin Sardar states that some of the greatest Muslim scientists of the Islamic Golden Age, such as Ibn al-Haytham and Abu Rayhan al-Biruni, who were pioneers of the scientific method, were themselves followers of the Ash'ari school of Islamic theology. Like other Ash'arites who believed that faith or taqlid should be applied only to Islam and not to any ancient Hellenistic authorities, Ibn al-Haytham's view that taqlid should be applied only to the prophets and messengers of Islam and not to any other authorities formed the basis for much of his scientific skepticism and criticism against Ptolemy and other ancient authorities in his Doubts Concerning Ptolemy and Book of Optics.

== See also ==
- 2016 international conference on Sunni Islam in Grozny
- 2020 International Maturidi Conference
- Islamic schools and branches
- List of prominent Ash'aris

== Bibliography ==
- Corbin, Henry (1993). History of Islamic Philosophy. London: Keagan Paul. ISBN 9781135198886.
- Frank, Richard M. (2016) [2008]. Gutas, Dimitri (ed.). Classical Islamic Theology: The Ash'arites. Texts and Studies on the Development and History of Kalam. Variorum Collected Studies Series. Vol. III. Abingdon, Oxfordshire: Routledge. ISBN 978-0-86078-979-6. LCCN 2008927099.
- Halverson, Jeffry R. (2010). "The Doctrines of Sunni Theology". Theology and Creed in Sunni Islam: The Muslim Brotherhood, Ash'arism, and Political Sunnism. New York: Palgrave Macmillan. pp. 13–31. doi:10.1057/9780230106581_2. ISBN 978-0-230-10658-1.
- Hughes, Aaron W. (2013). "Constituting Identities: Beliefs and Schools". Muslim Identities: An Introduction to Islam. New York: Columbia University Press. pp. 183–202. ISBN 978-0-231-53192-4. JSTOR 10.7312/hugh16146.13.
