= Ta'til =

Divesting Allah of physical or human attributes

In Islamic theology, taʿṭīl (Arabic: تَعْطِيل) means "divesting" God of attributes. The word literally means to suspend and stop the work and refers to a form of apophatic theology which is said because God bears no resemblance to his creatures and because the concepts available to man are limited and depends on his perceptions of his surroundings, so he has no choice but to remain silent about the divine attributes and suffice with the explanations given in the Quran and hadiths. Taʿṭīl is the polar opposite of tashbīh (anthropomorphism or anthropopathism), the ascription to God of physical characteristics or human attributes such as emotion. Both taʿṭīl and tashbīh are considered sins or heresies in mainstream Islam, frequently associated with a sect described by Sunni heresiography as the Jahmiyya.

The corrective doctrine against taʿṭīl is tathbīt (confirming God's attributes), and the corrective against tashbīh is tanzīh (keeping God pure).

== Muʿaṭṭila or taʿtili ==
Those accused of taʿṭīl may be referred to as muʿaṭṭila ("divestors") or taʿtili. Historically, the followers of Jahm ibn Safwan (d. 746) — the Jahmiyya — were called muʿaṭṭila by their opponents. In the Islamic world, muʿaṭṭila is also used to refer to those who believe the universe is eternal and lacks a wise creator.

The ninth-century Muʿtazilites were called muʿaṭṭila for their belief "[t]hat God is eternal [...] but they deny the existence of any eternal attributes (as distinct from His nature). [...] [K]nowledge, power, and life are part of His essence, otherwise, if they are to be looked upon as eternal attributes of the Deity, it will give rise to a multiplicity of eternal entities."

People who believe in dahriyah have also been called muʿaṭṭila. They believed that the universe was primitive and that God was not its creator, but that the intellects of the heavens and the stars caused the creation of beings.

According to Muslim scholars, in the Jahiliyyah, or pre-Islamic Arabia, there were muʿaṭṭila or ʿarab muʿaṭṭila. Some of them denied the existence of God and the Akhirah; some believed in God but rejected Akhirah; and some did not accept prophecy.

In general, groups and schools that are more inclined to a belief in transcendence are called muʿaṭṭila. Groups and schools that reject the imputation of attributes to the essence of God and believe in the objectivity of the essence and attributes have also been called muʿaṭṭila. The followers of Jahmism, Muʿtazilism, and Isma'ilism and philosophers and sages have also been called muʿaṭṭila or taʿtili by their opponents, although this type of naming may not be accurate.

== The views of the muʿaṭṭilas or ta'tilis ==
The views of the muʿaṭṭilas or ta'tilis is that the human intellect is not able to know the divine attributes and only the attributes of God should be paid very briefly and it should be enough to prove them in the Quran and hadiths. They believe that because man is incapable of understanding the truth of the meanings of the divine attributes, so the human intellect in this valley is doomed to suspend, hence this method is called "taʿṭīl" (suspended) and its followers are called "muʿaṭṭilas or ta'tilis".

The muʿaṭṭilas or ta'tilis argue that the concepts with which man intends to describe the divine attributes are derived from the limited and tangible environment and beings around him, and that these concepts are not suitable for describing the attributes of God. Since God bears no resemblance to creatures and man has nothing but the same limited concepts and definitions specific to the creatures, so man should be silent about the attributes of God and its meanings, and be satisfied with the guidance in the Quran and hadiths in this regard. Hereof, it has been narrated from the prominent eighth-century Islamic religious scholar and jurist Sufyan ibn ʽUyaynah that: The interpretation of what God has described Himself in the Divine Book (Quran) is that we should recite it and remain silent about it.

According to the view of the muʿaṭṭilas or ta'tilis, the last thing that can be expected from the human intellect about the attributes of God is to deprive the divine essence of the concepts and attributes related to defects and limitations. Such meanings of attributes such as "God is omniscient" or "God is omnipotent" imply that God is not ignorant or powerless. Thus, by presenting proving attributes for God, the human intellect has been able to remove some of the non-existent concepts expressing the imperfection and weakness of the divine essence. Man with his intellect can not prove the attributes of God and gain an understanding of the truths about God, but can ultimately rule with his intellect that God is free from all imperfections and limitations.

== Critique of this view ==
The muʿaṭṭilas or ta'tilis view has been criticized, including:

- There is certainly an understanding of God's attributes, although it may be primitive. With the help of intellect, man can comprehend the divine attributes, even if a little understood.
- Tashbih, or the believe in anthropomorphism, is an exaggeration of the attributes of God, and the theory of the "taʿṭīl" understates it.
- Humanity's greatest honor is that lone among the creatures are they able to know and gain the knowledge of God.
- It cannot be said that the good qualities of creatures are not related to their Creator. These attributes are found in the perfected versions and are highly related to the Creator. The difference between the creator and the creature is in the type of occurrence and the type of existence. For example, the type of existence of God is Aseity and has absolute and infinite knowledge, but man, as His creature, is possible to exist and has limited and finite knowledge.
- This view leads to a denial of the existence of God and His oneness.
- The text of the Quran regarding the divine attributes is not compatible with the theory of "taʿṭīl" and testifies to its invalidity. The Quran has many verses describing the divine attributes and names in which it has called man to ponder. If man was not able to understand the meaning of these attributes and names, the invitation to contemplation would not be raised in them.

== See also ==
- Apophatic theology
- Glossary of Islam
- I Am that I Am
- Islamic schools and branches
- Means of grace
- Shirk (Islam)
- Sabr
- Tetragrammaton and Yahweh
