= Rabb =

Arabic word used to refer to God as the "Lord" or "Master"

Rabb (Arabic: رب, lit. 'Lord') is an Arabic word to refer to God as Lord; it exists as a loanword in various languages, such as Punjabi (Punjabi: ਰੱਬ, lit. 'God; Lord'). It is used by adherents of various religions, including Muslims, Christians, Hindus, and Sikhs across the Middle East and Indian subcontinent in reference to the Supreme Being.

In the Quran, God refers to himself as "Rabb" in several places. When it is used with the definite article (al-Rabb) the Arabic word denotes "the Lord (God)". In other cases, the context makes it clear as to whom the word is referring to, in this case, "rabb" refers to "owner, master", for example rabb al-dar (رَبُّ ٱلْدَّار) means "master of the house/residence".

God in Islam is referred to by many qualities and attributes. In the first surah of the Quran, Al-Fatihah, the title "Rabb" is introduced in the first verse, "All Praise and Gratitude is due to God, Lord (Rabb) of all the worlds and Universe", thus stating clearly that God takes care, nourishes, fosters through every stage of existence, in which everything between that exists.

In the Indo-Gangetic Plain, especially in the Punjab region, the term "Rabb" or "Rab" is used by Muslims, Sikhs, Hindus and Christians to refer to God. An example of its usage is found in the song and track "Rabb Khair Kare".

== See also ==
- Rabbi – Hebrew word with a similar etymology
- Rebbe – Yiddish term derived rabbi, it mostly refers to the leader of a Hasidic Jewish movement.
