= Anthropomorphism and corporealism in Islam =

Islamic religious concept affirming similarity between Allah and human beings

In Islamic theology, anthropomorphism (Arabic: تشبيه, romanized: tashbīh) and corporealism (تجسيم tajsīm) refer to beliefs in the human-like (anthropomorphic) and materially embedded (corporeal) form of God. This idea has been classically described as assimilating or comparing God to the creatures created by God. An anthropomorphist is referred to as a mushabbih (Arabic: مشبه) (pl. mushabbiha, Arabic: مشبهة). A corporealist is referred to as a mujassim (Arabic: مجسم) (pl. mujassima, Arabic: مجسمة).

Questions of anthropomorphism and corporealism have historically been closely related to discussions of the attributes of God in Islam. By contrast, belief in the transcendence of God is called tanzih (Arabic: تنزيه). Muslims widely accept tanzih today,

In the past, it stridently competed with alternative views, including anthropomorphic ones, especially until the year 950, when anthropomorphism briefly attained "orthodox" recognition around or after the Mihna. In premodern times, corporealist views were said to have been more socially prominent among the common people, with more abstract and transcendental views more common for the elite.

In a broader sense, tashbih refers not only to attributions of physical or behavioral human traits to God, but also to discussions about spatiality, directionality (including aboveness) and confinement with God. Typically, traditionalism has been associated with corporealist views. Rationalism has been associated with incorporealist views. Instead, Jon Hoover divides the range of views relating to God's body, location, and spatiality into a fourfold typology: the first stance which passes over, without comment, all traditions that use anthropomorphic or corporeal language; one which explicitly identifies God as having a body (Arabic: جسم, romanized: jism); one which spatially places God above the world but avoids saying God has a body (which Hoover calls "spatialism"); and finally explicit incorporealism. Groups which maintained anthropomorphic views, historically, have included some traditionalist hadith transmitters, as well as Karramists and some Hanbalites.

Polemically, Kalam theologians accused the Ahl al-Hadith (traditionalists) of having fallen prey to tashbih since at least the 9th century. Ibn Taymiyya (d. 1328) wrote a famous and extensive refutation of incorporealist views in his Bayān Talbīs al-Jahmiyya ("Explication of the Deceit of Jahmism") as argued for by Abu Bakr al-Razi. Ibn Taymiyya has been characterized as a spatialist. Explicit incorporealism has been maintained by groups like the Mu'tazilites, Ibadis, Ash'aris, Maturidis, some Hanbalites, Twelver Shi'ism, Ismailism, and Zaydism.

== History ==
The extensive debates and discussions on anthropomorphism, active from the beginning of the second Islamic century and seemingly ignited by the Mu'tazilites in response to a group of traditionalist hadith transmitters, have often surrounded Quran verses and other traditions (especially the aḥādīth al-ṣifāt) that depict God and the attributes of God using anthropomorphic language. The early view among the "People of the Hadith" (aṣḥāb al-ḥadīth) was that God was a truly anthropomorphic being. In response, Mu'tazilites and the Jahmiyya emphasized God's divine simplicity (lacking any attributes) and his transcendence. For them, anthropomorphic traditions should be approached with an attitude that "passed on as they are without inquiry (imrāruhākamā jā’at bilā kayfa)", meaning that the apparently anthropomorphic traditions are accepted, but that their meaning is asserted to be unknowable to anyone but God. This approach came to be represented by the Arabic phrase "Bila Kayf" (Arabic: بلا كيف, lit. 'with-no (without) how'). While the meaning of the aḥādīth al-ṣifāt were often debated among traditionalist scholars, the Mu'tazilites entirely rejected the authenticity of any traditions that use anthropomorphic language to describe God.

The height of the power of Mu'tazilite and Jahmite scholars came during the reign of Abbasid caliph Al-Ma'mun. Traditionalist scholars were persecuted and sometimes killed if they refused to acknowledge the doctrine of the Createdness of the Quran and, in some instances, anti-anthropomorphic views, in an event that is known as the Mihna. This campaign ultimately failed, however, and soon, the traditionalist camp, especially as represented by Ahmad ibn Hanbal's Hanbali school, was accepted by political authorities (including it and Ibn Hanbal's anthropomorphism). The persecution during the Mihna bred the emergence of extremely anti-rationalist approaches, leading to anthropomorphism. In the tenth century, tensions grew with regards to the Hanbali interpretation of a ṣifāt concerning Quran 17:79: in the view of this tradition, the passage meant that Muhammad will be given a station, or a place to sit, alongside God on God's throne. Anyone who rejected this meaning, the Hanbalite's argued, was a heretic. The city of Baghdad remained a stronghold of traditionalist Hanbalite approaches to anthropomorphism up until the Fall of Baghdad in 1258.

Across his works, Al-Ash'ari adopts varying views relating to God's anthropomorphism and corporealism. In Kitāb al-Lumaʿ (Highlights), he criticizes the idea that God could be a three-dimensional object. In al-Ibāna ʿan uṣūl al-diyāna (Elucidation of the Foundations of the Religion), he affirms that God has hands, eyes, and a face, but does not inquire as to how it is so (Bila Kayf). At the same time, he criticizes Mu'tazilite approaches which directly remove any corporeal connotations from such statements. In the same text and without invoking Bila Kayf, al-Ash'ari affirms that God is located above his Throne. Despite Al-Ash'ari taking up these stances, later proponents of Ash'arism would concretely deny God's corporealism or spatial location.

From the 13th century AD onwards, the Ash'arite's developed two approaches that were broadly accepted in Sunni Islam as a means to avoid the literal meaning of anthropomorphic traditions: to either relegate their ultimate meaning as something known only to God while holding firmly to the incorporeality of God (the tafwīḍ solution), or to offer a rationalistic interpretation of the passage (the ta’wīl solution). By contrast, the Salafist reaction has rejected this approach, claiming that the Salaf (the earliest Muslims and the Companions of Muhammad) unquestioningly affirmed God's anthropomorphism, and arguing sometimes that ta'wil is tantamount to the heresy of innovation (bid'ah). For Salafist writers, ta'wil, especially in the case of anthropormophism, is a product of the preference for reason over revelation, and the Ash'arites are historically responsible for the deviation of the views of the Salaf regarding anthropormophism.

== Anthropomorphic traditions ==
=== In the Quran ===
Debates about God's spatiality in the Quran have typically revolved around a few passages/motifs which appear to describe God using corporeal or spatial language. Passages using directional language in relation to God include:

- Quran 16:50: "They [the angels] fear their Lord above them" (yaḫāfūna rabba-hum min fawqi-him)
- Quran 20:5: "The Most Merciful [who is] above the Throne established." (al-Raḥmānu ʿalā l-ʿarši stawā)

Passages that have been cited as being indicative of God having a very big, yet finite, spatial range include:

- Quran 6:103: "Eyes cannot grasp Him"
- Quran 20:110: "They do not encompass Him in knowledge"
- Quran 39:67: "And they do not measure God with a true measure. The earth in its entirety will be in His grip on the Day of Resurrection"

Furthermore, many verses in the Quran speak of God as having anthropomorphic features such as a face (18:28; 28:88; 76:9; 92:19–20), eye(s) (11:37; 20:39; 23:27; 54:14), and hands (5:64; 36:71; 48:10), as well as sitting on a throne (10:3; 20:5).

Some incorporealists proffer Quranic statements that they believe suggest incorporealism:

- Quran 42:11: "There is nothing like Him" (laysa ka-miṯli-hi šayʾun)
- Quran 112:1: "Say! God is One" (qul huwa Llāhu aḥadun)

According to Nicolai Sinai, the Quran has a material and anthropomorphic view of God.

=== In hadith ===
One prominent anthropomorphic tradition concerned a set of hadith which stated that God would make Muhammad a place to be seated on his Throne alongside him. The authenticity of these traditions were most stridently supported by members of the Hanbali school and, by the 15th century, the authenticity of the tradition itself had become widely accepted. Another prominent arena for these debates were the ḥadīth al-nuzūl, which refers to traditions that mention God descending to the lowest heaven in each night. For those who rejected the anthropomorphic reading of this passage, it was understood to reflect God's love (and other traits) for those who believe in him, as well as his willingness to answer their prayers. One of the ḥadīth al-ruʾyā (hadith concerned with dreams and visions) describes God having a "beautiful form" and physical contact with Muhammad:

One morning, the Messenger of God went out to them [his companions] in a joyous mood and [with] a radiant face. We said [to him]: “Oh Messenger of God, here you are in a joyous mood, with a glowing face!” “How could I not be?” he answered. “My Lord came to me last night under the most beautiful form (fī aḥsan ṣūra), and He said [to me]: ‘Oh Muhammad!’—‘Here I am, Lord, at Your order!’ He said [to me]: ‘Over what disputes the Sublime Council?’—‘I do not know, Lord.’ He posed [to me] two or three times the same question. Then He put His palm between my shoulder blades, to the point where I felt its coolness between my nipples, and from that moment appeared to me [all] that is in the heavens and on the earth.”

This hadith was reported three times by Ahmad ibn Hanbal with three different isnads (chains of narration), though later authors disputed whether or not Ahmad ibn Hanbal accepted the authenticity of the hadith, or if he accepted the hadith but did not impute from it any consequences. Among contemporary historians, whether Ahmad ibn Hanbal was an anthropomorphist is still debated.

== Shia Islam ==
Tashbih were not apparent in Zaydi Shia teaching, particularly in the thought of Al-Qasim al-Rassi, Zaidiyyah Imam of 8 AD century, an early Zaidi Imam.

== See also ==
- Ta'wil
- Tafwid
- Bila Kayf
