= Tafwid =

Arabic term

Tafwid (Arabic: تفويض) is an Arabic term meaning "relegation" or "delegation", with uses in theology and law.

== In theology ==
In Islamic theology, tafwid (or tafwid al-amr li-llah, relegation of matters to God) is a doctrine according to which the meanings of the ambiguous verses of the Qur'an should be consigned to God alone. Those who follow this school do not utilize metaphorical interpretation. Rather, they leave problematic texts uninterpreted, believing that the reality of their meaning should be left to the one who said them, implying their unknowability.

The doctrine of tafwid, which was held by a number of classical scholars such as al-Ghazali and whose origin they attributed to the salaf (exemplary early Muslims), states that the Quranic expressions such as 'God's hands' or 'face' do not carry the literal meanings their counterparts in human beings do. Rather, they are attributes or qualities of God and not organs like the face or hands of human beings. Other classical figures who subscribed to this doctrine were Ibn Qudamah, Suyuti, Ahmad Ibn Hanbal and Ibn Kathir. The latter discusses Tafwid as follows:

People have said a great deal on this topic and this is not the place to expound on what they have said. On this matter, we follow the early Muslims (salaf): Malik, Awza'i, Thawri, Layth ibn Sa'd, Shafi'i, Ahmad ibn Hanbal, Ishaq Ibn Rahwayh, and others among the Imams of the Muslims, both ancient and modern that is, to let (the verse in question) pass as it has come, without saying how it is meant (min ghayr takyif), without likening it to created things (wa la tashbih), and without nullifying it (wa la ta'til): The literal meaning (zahir) that occurs to the minds of anthropomorphists (al-mushabbihin) is negated of Allah, for nothing from His creation resembles Him: "There is nothing whatsoever like unto Him, and He is the All-Hearing, the All-Seeing" (Qur'an 42:11)

The precise nature of tafwid has been subject to debate among Muslim scholars. The followers of Ibn Taymiyya, including contemporary Salafis, hold that only the modality of the attributes should be consigned to God (tafwid al-kayfiyya), while the literal sense of the attributes should be accepted according to their lexical meaning in the Arabic language. Thus they argue that the salaf accepted that God has a hand, because the meaning of the word "hand" (yad) was known, but without assuming that God's hand is comparable to a human hand, or asking how or why that is. In contrast, anti-Salafi scholars reject this distinction and accept tafwid without qualification.

== Divorce ==
In Islamic personal status law, tafwid refers to a sub-type of divorce (talaq al-tafwid or tafwid al-talaq) in which the power of talaq (the type of divorce normally initiated by the husband) is delegated to the wife. This delegation can be made at the time of drawing up the marriage contract or during the marriage, with or without conditions. Classical jurists differed as to the validity of different forms of delegation. Most modern Muslim-majority countries permit this type of divorce in some form.

== Other uses ==
The term tafwid has also been used in law with various other meanings related to delegation of power, authorization of an act, or issuance of a warrant for arrest.
