= Ahad =

Ahad (Persian: احد; Hebrew: אחד; Arabic: احد; Urdu: احد) is a Middle Eastern given forename primarily used by Muslims and Jews. It is also used as a family name (surname) (e.g. Oli Ahad).

Ahad is usually used in the Middle East, and it means "Unique".

== Given name ==
- Ahad Azam (born 1992), Israeli-Druze footballer
- Ahad Cheema, Pakistani bureaucrat
- Ahad Gudarziani (1969–2019), Iranian writer
- Ahad Ha'am, pen name of Asher Ginsberg (1856–1927), Hebrew writer
- Ahad Hosseini (born 1944), Iranian Azerbaijani artist
- Ahad Kazemi (born 1975), Iranian cyclist
- Ahad Khan (born 1937), Pakistani cricketer
- Ahad Israfil (1972–2019), American shooting survivor
- Ahad Pazaj (born 1970), Iranian wrestler
- Ahad Raza Mir (born 1993), Pakistani actor
- Ahad Ali Sarker (born 1952), Bangladeshi politician
- Ahad Sheykhlari (born 1960), Iranian footballer and manager

== Surname ==
- Abdul Ahad (music director) (1918–1996), Bangladeshi musical artist
- Ghaith Abdul-Ahad (born 1975), Iraqi journalist
- Oli Ahad (1928–2012), Bangladeshi politician
- Samia Ahad, Pakistani chef

== Fictional character ==
- Altaïr Ibn-La'Ahad, a Levantine member of the Assassin Order, main character of the videogame series Assassin's Creed.

== Religion ==
- Al-Aḥad, one of the Names of God in Islam
