= Samia Ahad =

Pakistani chef

- Born: Pakistan
- Education: Peter Kump's Cooking School
- Culinary career
- Cooking style: Singaporean cuisine
- Current restaurants
- Coriander Leaf; Screening Room

Samia Ahad is a Pakistani chef who is head chef at the Coriander Leaf restaurant in Singapore, having previously worked in restaurants in Manhattan. Ahad opened a second restaurant, inside her Screening Room entertainment complex.

== Career ==
Samia Ahad was born in Pakistan. She ended up working as a travel agent in London for ten years, before moving to New York City with her husband. While there, she learnt to cook and trained in French cuisine at Peter Kump's Cooking School (now the Institute of Culinary Education). She worked in Manhattan restaurants such as The Quilted Giraffe. Her husband's job was transferred to Singapore, and so they couple moved in 1997. In 2001, she opened the Coriander Leaf restaurant where she became head chef.

Ahad also runs cooking courses out of the restaurant. In addition to Singapore cuisine, she also teaches Pakistan, Persian, Turkish among others. In 2007, she opened the Screening Room, a five storey entertainment complex featuring a restaurant. A year later, her first cook book, Simply Samia, was published.
