= Tanzih =

Islamic religious concept meaning transcendence

Tanzih (Arabic: تنزيه) is an Islamic exaltation terminology meaning transcendence. In ordinary usage, it refers to the addressee being exempted from a certain fault or crime, while in Islamic theology, it means purifying the Creator from faults and limitations belonged to creatures.

In Islamic theology, two opposite terms are attributed to God: tanzih and tashbih. The second, 'affirming similarity', gives the absolute mental 'closeness', 'accessibility', 'comprehensibility'; for example, God is a powerful king sitting on his throne and a lord to be respected.

The literal meaning of the word is "to declare something pure and free of something else". This definition affirms that Allah cannot be likened to anything: "Nothing is like Him." (Sura 42:11) and reinforces the fundamental, underlying Islamic belief in tawhid.

Islamic theology rejects extremism in tanzih and tashbih and advises that it should be moderate. Because going too far in tanzih means negating the attributes of God, while going too far in tasbih will make God ordinary and open the way for idolatry.

See also: Tasbih, Attributes of God in Islam
