= Transcendence (religion) =

Deity's nature beyond the material universe

In religion, transcendence is the aspect of existence that is completely independent of the material universe, beyond all known physical laws. This is related to the nature and power of deities as well as other spiritual or supernatural beings and forces. This is contrasted with immanence, where a god is said to be fully present in the physical world and thus accessible to creatures in various ways. In religious experience, transcendence is a state of being that has overcome the limitations of physical existence, and by some definitions, has also become independent of it. This is typically manifested in prayer, rituals, meditation, psychedelics and paranormal visions.

It is affirmed in various religious traditions' concept of the divine, which contrasts with the notion of a god (or, the Absolute) that exists exclusively in the physical order (immanentism), or is indistinguishable from it (pantheism). Transcendence can be attributed in knowledge as well as or instead of its being. Thus, an entity may transcend both the universe and knowledge (is beyond the grasp of the human mind).

Although transcendence is defined as the opposite of immanence, the two are not necessarily mutually exclusive. Some theologians and metaphysicians of various religious traditions affirm that a god is both within and beyond the universe (panentheism); in it, but not of it; simultaneously pervading it and surpassing it.

== In Abrahamic religions ==
=== Judaism ===
Jewish theologians, especially since the Middle Ages, have described the transcendence of God in terms of divine simplicity, explaining the traditional characteristics of God as omniscient and omnipotent. Interventions of divine transcendence occur in the form of events outside the realm of natural occurrence such as miracles and the revelation of the Ten Commandments to Moses at Mount Sinai.

In Jewish Kabbalistic cosmology, God is described as the "Ein Sof" (literally, without end) as reference to God's divine simplicity and essential unknowability. The emanation of creation from the Ein Sof is explained through a process of filtering. In the Kabbalistic creation myth referred to as the "breaking of the vessels," filtering was necessary because otherwise this intense, simple essence would have overwhelmed and made impossible the emergence of any distinct creations. Each filter, described as a vessel, captured the emanation of this creative force until it was overwhelmed and broken by the intensity of God's simple essence. Once broken, the vessel's shards, full of absorbed "divine sparks," fell into a vessel below. This process ultimately continued until the "light" of Godliness was sufficiently reduced to allow the world we inhabit to be sustained without breaking. The creation of this world, however, comes with the consequence that Godly transcendence is hidden, or "exiled" (from the immanent world). Only through the revelation of sparks hidden within the shards embedded in our material world can this transcendence be recognized again. In Hasidic thought, divine sparks are revealed through the performance of commandments or "mitzvot," (literally, the obligations and prohibitions described in the Torah). A Kabbalistic explanation for the existence of malevolence in the world is that such terrible things are possible with the divine sparks being hidden. Thus there is some urgency to performing mitzvot in order to liberate the hidden sparks and perform a "tikkun olam" (literally, healing of the world). Until then, the world is presided over by the immanent aspect of God, often referred to as the Shekhinah or divine spirit, and in feminine terms.

=== Christianity ===
The Catholic Church, as do other Christian denominations, holds that God transcends all creation. According to Aquinas, "concerning God, we cannot grasp what he is, but only what he is not, and how other beings stand in relation to him." Anthropomorphic depictions of God are largely metaphorical and reflect the challenge of "human modes of expression" in attempting to describe the infinite. St. Augustine observed "...[I]t is only by the use of such human expressions that Scripture can make its many kinds of readers whom it wants to help to feel, as it were, at home." The "sense of transcendence" and therefore, an awareness of the "sacred", is an important component of the liturgy. Thus, God is recognized as both transcendent and immanent.

Transcendence of God is implicitly affirmed by the First Vatican Council's apostolic constitution Dei Filius:

The holy Catholic Apostolic Roman Church believes and confesses that there is one true and living God, Creator and Lord of heaven and earth, almighty, eternal, immense, incomprehensible, infinite in intelligence, in will, and in all perfection, who, as being one, sole, absolutely simple and immutable spiritual substance, is to be declared as really and essentially distinct from the world, of supreme beatitude in and from Himself, and ineffably exalted above all things which exist, or are conceivable, except Himself.

— Dei Filius, Chapter I

God's transcendence deals with His impassibility, ineffability, as well as with His immutability and infinity (all what is in the space-time is mutable and finite).

=== Islam ===
Tawhid is the act of believing and affirming that God (Arabic: Allah) is one and unique (wāḥid). The Qur'an asserts the existence of a single and absolute truth that transcends the world; a unique and indivisible being who is independent of the entire creation. According to the Qur'an, as mentioned in Surat al-Ikhlas:

1. Say: He, Allah, is Ahad (the Unique One of Absolute Oneness, who is indivisible in nature, who is unique in His essence, attributes, names and acts, the One who has no second, no associate, no parents, no offspring, no peers, free from the concept of multiplicity, and far from conceptualization and limitation, and there is nothing like Him in any respect).

2. Allah is al-Samad (the Ultimate Source of all existence, the uncaused cause who created all things out of nothing, who is eternal, absolute, immutable, perfect, complete, essential, independent, and self-sufficient; Who does not need to eat or drink, sleep or rest; Who needs nothing while all of creation is in absolute need of Him; the one eternally and constantly required and sought, depended upon by all existence and to whom all matters will ultimately return).

3. He begets not, nor is He begotten (He is Unborn and Uncreated, has no parents, wife or offspring).

4. And there is none comparable (equal, equivalent or similar) to Him.

According to Vincent J. Cornell, the Qur'an also provides a monist image of God by describing the reality as a unified whole, with God being a single concept that would describe or ascribe all existing things: "God is the First and the Last, the Outward and the Inward; God is the Knower of everything." [Qur'an 57:3] All Muslims have however vigorously criticized interpretations that would lead to a monist view of God for what they see as blurring the distinction between the creator and the creature, and its incompatibility with the radical monotheism of Islam.

In order to explain the complexity of unity of God and of the divine nature, the Qur'an uses 99 terms referred to as "Most Beautiful Names of Allah" (Sura 7:180)[12]. Aside from the supreme name "Allah" and the neologism al-Rahman (referring to the divine beneficence that constantly (re)creates, maintains and destroys the universe), other names may be shared by both God and human beings. According to the Islamic teachings, the latter is meant to serve as a reminder of God's immanence rather than being a sign of one's divinity or alternatively imposing a limitation on God's transcendent nature.

Tawhid or Oneness of God constitutes the foremost article of the Muslim profession. To attribute divinity to a created entity is the only unpardonable sin mentioned in the Qur'an. Muslims believe that the entirety of the Islamic teaching rests on the principle of Tawhid.

=== Baháʼí Faith ===
The Baháʼí Faith believes in a single, imperishable god, the creator of all things, including all the creatures and forces in the universe. In the Baháʼí tradition, god is described as "a personal god, unknowable, inaccessible, the source of all Revelation, eternal, omniscient, omnipresent, and almighty." Though inaccessible directly, God is nevertheless seen as conscious of his creation, with a mind, will, and purpose. Baháʼís believe that God expresses this will at all times and in many ways, including through a series of divine messengers referred to as Manifestations of God or sometimes divine educators. In expressing God's intent, these manifestations are seen to establish religion in the world. Baháʼí teachings state that God is too great for humans to fully comprehend, nor to create a complete and accurate image.

== In Eastern religions ==
=== Buddhism ===
In Buddhism, "transcendence", by definition, belongs to the mortal beings of the formless realms of existence. However, although such beings are at 'the peak' of Samsara, Buddhism considers the development of transcendence to be both temporary and a spiritual cul-de-sac which, therefore, does not eventuate a permanent cessation of Samsara. This assertion was a primary differentiator from the other Sramana teachers during Gautama Buddha's own training and development.

Alternatively, in the various forms of Buddhism—Theravada, Mahayana (especially Pure Land and Zen) and Vajrayana—the notion of transcendence sometimes includes a soteriological application. Except for Pure Land and Vajrayana, the role played by transcendent beings is minimal and at most a temporary expedient. However some Buddhists believe that Nirvana is an eternal, transcendental state beyond name and form, so for these Buddhists, Nirvana is the main concept of transcendence. The more usual interpretation of Nirvana in Buddhism is that it is a cessation—a permanent absence of something (namely suffering), and therefore it is not in any way a state which could be considered transcendent.

Primordial enlightenment and the dharma are sometimes portrayed as transcendent, since they can surpass all samsaric obstructions.

=== Hinduism ===
In the Bhagavad Gita, transcendence is described as a level of spiritual attainment, or a state of being open to all spiritual aspirants (the end goal of yoga practice). In this state one is no longer under the control of any materialistic desires and is aware of a higher spiritual reality.

When the yogī, by practice of yoga, disciplines his mental activities and becomes situated in transcendence – devoid of all material desires – he is said to be well established in yoga.

The exact nature of this transcendence is given as being "above the modes of material nature", which are known as gunas (ropes) that bind the living entity to the world of samsara (karmic cycle) in Hindu philosophy.

Transcendence is described and viewed from diverse perspectives in Hinduism. Traditions such as Advaita Vedanta, in transcendence, view God as the Nirguna Brahman (God without attributes) – the absolute. Other traditions such as Bhakti yoga, in transcendence, view God as being with attributes (Saguna Brahman), the Absolute being a personal deity (Ishvara), such as Vishnu or Shiva.

=== Sikhism ===
Waheguru (Punjabi: ਵਾਹਿਗੁਰੂ, Vāhigurū) is a term most often used in Sikhism to refer to God, the Supreme Being or the creator of all. It means "Wonderful Teacher" in the Punjabi language, but in this case is used to refer to the God in Sikhism. Wahi means "wonderful" (a Middle Persian borrowing) and "Guru" (Sanskrit: गुरु) is a term denoting "teacher". Waheguru is also described by some as an experience of ecstasy which is beyond all descriptions.

Cumulatively, the name implies wonder at the Divine Light eliminating spiritual darkness. It might also imply, "Hail the Lord whose name eliminates spiritual darkness." Earlier, Shaheed Bhai Mani Singh, Sikhan di Bhagat Mala, gave a similar explication, also on the authority of Guru Nanak. Considering the two constituents of "Vahiguru" ("vahi" + "guru") implying the state of wondrous ecstasy and offering of homage to the Lord, the first one was brought distinctly and prominently into the devotional system by Guru Nanak, who has made use of this interjection, as in Majh ki Var (stanza 24), and Suhi ki Var, shloka to pauri 10.

Sikh doctrine identifies one panentheistic god (Ik Onkar) who is omnipresent and has infinite qualities, whose name is true (Satnam), is the Creator (Karta Purkh), has no fear (Nirb hau), is not the enemy of anyone (Nirvair), is beyond time (Akaal), has no image (Murat), is beyond birth and death circulation (Ajunee), is self-existent (Sai Bhang) and possesses the grace of word guru (eternal light) we can meet him (Gurprasaad). Sikhs do not identify a gender for Ek Onkar, nor do they believe it takes a human form. In the Sikh tradition, all human beings are considered equal regardless of their religion, sex, or race. All are sons and daughters of Waheguru, the Almighty.

== In secular culture ==
In 1961, Christian theologian Gabriel Vahanian published The Death of God. Vahanian argued that modern secular culture had lost all sense of the sacred, lacking any sacramental meaning, no transcendental purpose or sense of providence. He concluded that for the modern secular mind "God is dead", but he did not mean that God did not exist. In Vahanian's vision a transformed post-Christian and post-modern culture was needed to create a renewed experience of deity.

Paul Van Buren and William Hamilton both agreed that the concept of transcendence had lost any meaningful place in modern secular thought. According to the norms of contemporary modern secular thought, God is dead. In responding to this denial of transcendence Van Buren and Hamilton offered secular people the option of Jesus as the model human who acted in love. The encounter with the Christ of faith would be open in a church-community.

Thomas J. J. Altizer offered a radical theology of the death of God that drew upon William Blake, Hegelian thought and Nietzschean ideas. He conceived of theology as a form of poetry in which the immanence (presence) of God could be encountered in faith communities. However, he no longer accepted the possibility of affirming his belief in a transcendent God. Altizer concluded that God had incarnated in Christ and imparted his immanent spirit which remained in the world even though Jesus was dead. It is important that such ideas are understood as socio-cultural developments and not as ontological realities. As Vahanian expressed it in his book, the issue of the denial of God lies in the mind of secular man, not in reality.

Critiquing the death of God theology, Joseph Papin, the founder of the Villanova Theology Institute, noted: "Rumbles of the new theology of the 'Requiem for God," (theologians of the death of God) proved to be a totally inadequate foundation for spanning a theological river with a bridge. The school of the theology of the "Requiem of God," not even implementing a "Requiem for Satan," will constitute only a footnote to the history of theology. ... 'The Grave of God,' was the death rattle for the continuancy of the aforementioned school without any noticeable echo." Professor Piet Schoonenberg (Nijmegen, Netherlands) directly critiqued Altizer concluding: "Rightly understood the transcendence of God does not exclude His immanence, but includes it." Schoonenberg went on to say: "We must take God's transcendence seriously by not imposing any limits whatsoever, not even the limits that our images or concepts of transcendence evoke. This however occurs when God's transcendence is expressed as elevated over the world to the exclusion of his presence in this world; when his independence is expressed by excluding his real relation and reaction to the world; or when we insist upon his unchangeable eternity to the exclusion of his real partnership in human history."

== See also ==
- Apophatic theology
- Incorporeal
- Out-of-body experience
- Supernatural
