= Al‑Kawthari =

Islamic scholar and theologian (1879–1952)

Al-Kawthari
- الكوثري

Personal life
- Born: Muhammad Zahid Hasan c. 1879 Düzce, Kastamonu Vilayet, Ottoman Empire
- Died: 1952 (aged 72–73) Cairo, Egypt
- Main interest(s): Aqidah, Kalam (Islamic theology), Fiqh (Islamic jurisprudence), Hadith studies, Shari'a (Islamic law), Tasawwuf, Literature
- Notable work(s): Maqalat al-Kawthari, Mahq al-Taqawwul fi Mas'alat al-Tawassul, Al-Lamadhhabiyya Qantarat al-Ladiniyya

Religious life
- Religion: Islam
- Denomination: Sunni
- Jurisprudence: Hanafi
- Creed: Maturidi

Muslim leader
- Influenced by: Abu Hanifa Muhammad al-Shaybani Abu Yusuf Zufar ibn al-Hudhayl Abu Mansur al-Maturidi Al-Tahawi Al-Bayhaqi Al-Baqillani Al-Juwayni Ibn Asakir Taqi al-Din al-Subki Taqi al-Din al-Hisni Badr al-Din al-'Ayni Sibt ibn al-Jawzi Ibn al-Jawzi Abd al-Ghani al-Nabulsi
- Influenced: Muhammad Abu Zahra Abdullah al-Ghumari 'Abdullah al-Harari Wahbi Sulayman Ghawji Gibril Fouad Haddad Sa'id Foudah 'Abd al-Fattah Abu Ghuddah

Muhammad Zahid ibn al-Ḥasan ibn ʿAlī (Arabic: محمد زاهد ابن الحسن ابن علي; c. 1879–1952), commonly known by the nisba al-Kawthari (Turkish: Kevserî; Arabic: الكوثري), was an Islamic scholar and theologian. A prolific author of over 40 works, al-Kawthari followed the Hanafi school of jurisprudence and championed the Maturidi school of theology.

A Circassian, al-Kawthari was born in Düzce, Ottoman Empire and studied at the Fatih Mosque, Istanbul. After the fall of the Ottoman Empire, al-Kawthari fled to the Kingdom of Egypt in 1922 to avoid crackdown by the Kemalists. He then resided in Cairo and became a well-known scholar there.

Al-Kawthari authored numerous works defending traditional Hanafism and was a staunch critic of Salafism and Kemalism. He was known for authoring numerous works on the different Islamic Sciences and editing different manuscripts. He is widely honored by modern Hanafis, and is considered a leading Shaykh al-Islam of the Ottoman era.

== Biography ==
Muhammad Zahid Hasan was born in 1879 in Düzce, then part of the Ottoman Empire. He was of Circassian descent from the Shapsug tribe and the "Guser" (Adyghe: Гусэр) clan, which was then Turkised as "Kevser", which, according to him, was a mispronouncation. He later embraced the name while using Arabic, in the form of the nisba "al-Kawthari". His father Hasan Hilmi Efendi had fled his native Circassia during the Circassian genocide and settled in Turkey. Kawthari was fluent in the Adyghe language and attempted to help Circassians during the course of his life.

After the fall of the Ottoman Empire, the Atatürkists began a violent crackdown on the religious scholarly class.

Fearing that his life may be in danger, al-Kawthari fled to Cairo, then to Syria and finally returning to Cairo. There, he edited classical works of Fiqh, Hadith and Usul al-Fiqh, bringing them back into circulation. In particular, he wrote short biographies of prominent personalities of the Hanafi school of thought. A staunch Maturidi, he held a critical view of the medieval scholar Ibn Taymiyya and his student Ibn al-Qayyim.

== Scholarly works ==
al-Kawtharī had left numerous works including nearly 51 original works, 30 critical editions, and prefaces for 30 works. Most of the works that he wrote in Astāna are in manuscript form while the majority of the rest are published. The commonly known works are as follows.

=== Critical Editions ===
- Tabyīn kadhib al-muftarī fī-mā nusiba ila al-Imām Abī al-Hasan al-Ash'ari - A defence of Abu al-Ḥasan al-Ashʿarī by Ibn ʿAsākir
- Tabdīd al-ẓalam al-mūkhīm min nūniyyat Ibn al-Qayyim – Refutation of Ibn al-Qayyim's Nūniyyah by Taqī al-Dīn al-Subkī
- al-Inṣāf fī-mā yajib iʿtiqāduhu wa-lā yajūz al-jahl bihi - A book on theology by al-Baqillani
- Marātib al-ijmāʿ - a book on Ijmāʿ by Ibn Hazm and its refutation by Ibn Taymiyyah
- al-Asmāʾ wa-al-ṣifāt - a book on theology by al-Bayhaqī
- Munyah al-Almaʿī fī-mā fāta min takhrīj aḥādīth al-Hidāyah lil-Zaylaʿī - A supplemental book to Naṣb al-Rayah of al-Zaylaʿī that illustrates Hadith supporting the legal positions stated in the classical Hanafī manual al-Hidayah

=== Prefaces ===
- Fiqh Ahl al-`Iraq wa Hadithuhum – Originally an introduction to Nasb al-Raya, it was published separately with Shaykh Abdul Fattah Abu Ghudda's footnotes.
- Fatḥ al-mulhim fī sharḥ Ṣaḥīḥ Muslim - A commentary on Sahih Muslim by Shabbir Ahmad Usmani
- Ishārāt al-marām - A book on Maturidi theology by Kamāl al-Dīn al Bayāḍī
- Manāqib al-Imam al-Shāfiʿī - A laudatory biography of Imam al-Shāfiʿī by Ibn Abī Ḥātim al-Rāzī
- Qānūn al-taʾwīl - A book on theology by al-Ghazālī

=== Original Works ===
- Maqālāt al-Kawthari – Collection of his articles
- Muqaddimāt al-Kawtharī - Collection of his prefaces to different books
- Taʾnīb al-Khaṭib ʿalā mā sāqahu fī tarjamah Abī Ḥanīfah min al-akādhīb - A refutation of al-Khatib al-Baghdadi's allegations about Imam Abu Hanifa in his work, Tarikh Baghdad
- al-Nukat al-ṭarīfah fī al-taḥadduth ʿan rudūd Ibn Abī Shaybah ʿalā Abī Ḥanifah - A response to Ibn Abi Shaybah's refutations of Imam Abu Hanifa, mainly the claim that Abu Hanifa went against 125 authentic hadith which this books replies to case-by-case
- Iḥqāq al-ḥaqq bi-ibṭāl al-bāṭil fī mughīth al-khalq - A response to the accusations of Imam al-Juwayni against the hanafis in his work Mughīth al-khalq
- Al-Istibṣār fī al-taḥadduth ʿan al-jabr wa al-ikhtiyār – (The Obtainment of Insight Concerning Determinism and Freedom of Choice).
- Ḥusn al-taqāḍī fī sīrah al-Imām Abī Yūsuf al-Qāḍī – A biography of Imam Abu Yusuf
- Bulugh al-amānī fī sīrah al-Imām Muḥammad ibn al-Ḥasan al-Shaybānī – A biography of Imam Muhammad al-Shaybāni
- al-Ḥāwī fī sīrah al-Imām Abī Jaʿfar al-Ṭaḥāwī – A biography of Imam Al-Tahawi
- al-Imtāʿ bi-sīrah al-Imāmayn al-Ḥasan ibn Ziyād wa ṣāḥibuhu Muḥammad ibn Shujāʿ - A biography of Imam Hasan ibn Ziyād and Imam Muḥammad ibn Shujāʿ
- Hanin al-Mutafajji` wa Anin al-Mutawajji`– A poem on the horrors of World War I.
- Al-Fara'id al-Wafiya fi `Ilmay al-`Arud wa al-Qafya – (The Abundant Peerless Matters in the Two Sciences of Prosody and Rhyme)

== Assessment and legacy ==
Mufti Muhammad Anwar Khan Qasmi, a Deobandi scholar, has recently translated many of al-Kawthari's works into Urdu and published them in Indian academic journals and magazines. For example, al-La Madhhabiyya Qintarat al-La Diniyya, an article al-Kawthari wrote equating non-adherence to the schools of jurisprudence to irreligiousness, was translated by Qasmi with extensive footnotes and introduction by him and published by Deoband Islamic Research and Education Trust in 2013 under the title of Ghayr Muqallidiyyat: Ilhad Ka Darwaza. Also, Qasmi translated al-Kawthari's extensive introduction to Imam Ibn `Asakir's Tabyin Kadhib al-Muftari, published by the same center in Deoband in 2013, under the title of Islami Firqe: Eik Jaiza. Qasmi also translated and edited in Urdu one of his great books called Fiqh Ahl al-`Iraq wa Hadīthuhum, initially an introduction to Naṣb al-Rāyah, which was published separately with ʿAbdul Fattāḥ's footnotes. On the same pattern, other books of al-Kawthari like Min ʿIbar al-Tārīkh fi al-Kayd lil-Islam, and his introduction to the book al-Asmā wa al-Sifāt of al-Bayhaqi, and al-Kawthari's footnotes on al-Dhahabi's Bayan Zaghal al-Ilam were also edited and translated by Qasmi and published by the same center in Deoband.
