= Tabyin Kadhib al-Muftari =

Book by Ibn Asakir defending Abu al-Hasan al-Ash'ari

- Clarifying the Lie of the Calumniator
- Editors: Muhammad Zahid al-Kawthari, Anas Muhammad 'Adnan al-Sharafawi
- Author: Abu al-Qasim ibn Asakir
- Original title: تبيين كذب المفتري فيما نسب إلى الإمام أبي الحسن الأشعري
- Translator: Gibril Fouad Haddad
- Language: Arabic, English
- Subject: Islamic studies, Tabaqat, Kalam (Islamic theology)
- Publisher: Al-Maktaba al-Azhariyya lil-Turath, Dar al-Taqwa
- Publication place: Levant (present-day Syria, Palestine, Jordan, Lebanon)
- Followed by: Tarikh Madinat Dimashq (The History of the City of Damascus)

Tabyin Kadhib al-Muftari fima Nusiba ila al-Imam Abi al-Hasan al-Ash'ari (Arabic: تبيين كذب المفتري فيما نسب إلى الإمام أبي الحسن الأشعري, lit. 'The Exposition of the Fabricator's Lies in What He Attributed to Imam al-Ash'ari') is a polemic book with a powerful message against the detractors of Abu al-Hasan al-Ash'ari (d. 324/935), written by the Shafi'i hadith master (hafiz) Ibn 'Asakir (d. 571/1176), who vindicated him from deviant views and claims falsely attributed to him.

The book was actually written in response to Abu 'Ali al-Ahwazi (d. 446/1055) who wrote a book compiling criticisms and disparagements upon al-Ash'ari. For this reason, Ibn 'Asakir authored the book, to defend the honour and integrity of al-Ash'ari, and to establish and affirm that al-Ash'ari was in agreement with Imam Ahmad ibn Hanbal (d. 241/855) after his conversion from the Mu'tazilite theology to the orthodox Sunni doctrine.

The author gives a list of some seventy Ash'ari scholars divided into five classes (tabaqat), starting with the biographical layer of al-Ash'ari himself.

The book has been in print since 1928 and has been the subject of several studies.

== Content ==
Tabyin Kadhib al-Muftari is a biography of Imam Al-Ash'ari, relaying his ancestry, his conversion from Mu'tazilism and his subsequent "middle position" creed, i.e. Orthodox Sunni Islam. In it, Ibn Asakir lays out Ash'ari's "middle position" in 13 points, highlighting two opposing and extreme views in each and discussing the middle position Ash'ari took. For example, he writes:

1. "The Hashwiyya, who liken Allah to creation, said: Allah can be subject to modality and dimension like anything that can be seen. The Mu'tazila, the Jahmiyya, and the Najjariyya said: Allah cannot be seen under any circumstance whatsoever. Al-Ash'ari took the middle road and said: He can be seen without indwelling (min ghayri hulūl) and without acquiring limits nor being subject to modality."

2. "Likewise, The Najjariyya held that the Creator is in every place without localisation or direction. And the Hashwiyya and Mujassima held that God is localised on the Throne, and that Throne is a place for Him, and that He is sitting on it. But al-Ash'ari followed a middle course between them and held that God was when no place was, and then He created the Throne and the [Kursiyy] without His needing a place, and He was just the same after creating place as He had been before He created it."

3. "The Mu'tazila said: He has a "hand" (yad) but His "hand" is His power (qudra) and favor (ni'ma), while His face (wajh) is His existence. The Hashwiyya said: His hand is a limb (jāriha), and His face has a form (sūra). Al-Ash'ari took the middle road and said: His hand is an attribute and his face is an attribute, just like His hearing and His sight.

4. "The Mu'tazila said: [Allah's] descent (nuzūl) is the descent of any given sign of His, or that of His angels, while istiwā means mastery (istīla'). The Mushabbiha and Hashwiyya said: Descent is the descent of His person (dhāt) through movement (haraka) and displacement (intiqal), and istiwā is His sitting on the Throne and indwelling on top of it. Al-Ash'ari took the middle road and said: Descent is one of His attributes and istiwā is one of His attributes and an action which He did pertaining to the Throne, called istiwā."

5. "The Muʿtazila said: 'the Speech of Allah Most High is created, invented, and brought into being.' The Hashwiyya, who attribute a body to Allah the Exalted, said: 'The alphabetical characters (al-hurūf al-muqattaʿa), the materials on which they are written, the colors in which they are written, and all that is between the two covers [of the volumes of Qur'an] is beginningless and pre-existent (qadīma azaliyya). Al-Ashʿari took a middle road between them and said: The Qur'an is the beginningless speech of Allah Most High unchanged, uncreated, not of recent origin in time, nor brought into being. As for the alphabetical characters, the materials, the colors, the voices, the elements that are subject to limitations (al-mahdūdāt), and all that is subject to modality (al-mukayyafāt) in the world: all this is created, originated, and produced."

== Reception ==
Al-Dhahabi said: "Whoever seeks to develop deep knowledge about al-Ash'ari must read Kitab Tabyin Kadhib al-Muftari by Hafiz Abu al-Qasim Ibn Asakir"

The book was also highly recommended and praised by the Shafi'i scholar Taj al-Din al-Subki (d. 771/1370).

== See also ==
- Mujarrad Maqalat al-Ash'ari
- Al-Sayf al-Saqil fi al-Radd ala Ibn Zafil
- Daf' Shubah al-Tashbih
- Al-Insaf fima Yajib I'tiqaduh
- Ta'sis al-Taqdis
- The Moderation in Belief
- A Guide to Conclusive Proofs for the Principles of Belief
- List of Sunni books

== Source ==
- Al-Bayhaqi (1999). Allah's Names and Attributes. Vol. 4 of Islamic Doctrines & Beliefs. Translated by Gibril Fouad Haddad. Islamic Supreme Council of America. p. 221. ISBN 9781930409033.
