= Mujarrad Maqalat al-Ash'ari =

Book by Ibn Furak

- Only Articles of Abu al-Hasan al-Ash'ari
- Editors: Muhammad Faruq Hashim; Ahmad 'Abd al-Rahim al-Sayih
- Author: Ibn Furak
- Original title: مجرّد مقالات الشيخ أبي الحسن الأشعري
- Language: Arabic
- Subject: 'Aqidah (Islamic theology)
- Publisher: Amman: Dar al-Nur al-Mubin
- Followed by: Mushkil al-Hadith wa Bayanuh (Ambiguity of the Hadith and its Explanation)

Mujarrad Maqalat al-Shaykh Abi al-Hasan al-Ash'ari (Arabic: مجرّد مقالات الشيخ أبي الحسن الأشعري, lit. 'Summary of Shaykh Abi al-Hasan al-Ash'ari's Treatises/Articles') is an Islamic theological book written by the Shafi'i-Ash'ari scholar Ibn Furak (d. 406/1015), in which he gives a summary of the views, ideas and opinions of the Sunni scholar Abu al-Hasan al-Ash'ari (d. 324/935), the theologian after whom the Ash'ari school of theology is named.

This work is considered as one of the most important and essential sources of the Ash'ari school of Islamic theology.

== Content ==
The work is a methodical exposition of the teaching of al-Ash'ari, written some sixty years after his death. It contains several topics on theological issues in Islam, and other topics that are fundamentals in dialogue, such as demonstration, refutation, evidence and citation. Towards the end of the book is a chapter dedicated to the ethics of disputation (adab al-jadal).

== Notes ==
- Ibn Fūrak adopted al-Ash'ari's school of theology and was well informed of al-Ash'ari's views. This is because Ibn Fūrak learnt from two of al-Ash'ari's close companions and disciples, namely Abu al-Hasan al-Bahili (d. ca. 370/980) and Abu 'Abd Allah b. Mujahid al-Ta'i (d. 360s/970s or 370s/980s). In addition, he had recourse to all of al-Ash'ari's books.

== See also ==
- Maqalat al-Islamiyyin wa Ikhtilaf al-Musallin
- Istihsan al-Khawd fi 'Ilm al-Kalam
- Tabyin Kadhib al-Muftari
- Al-Insaf fima Yajib I'tiqaduh
- Asas al-Taqdis
- List of Sunni books
