= Istihsan al-Khawd fi 'Ilm al-Kalam =

Treatise by Abu al-Hasan al-Ash'ari

- Treatise on the Appropriateness of Inquiry in the Science of Kalam
- Editor: Jamil Halim al-Husaini
- Author: Abu al-Hasan al-Ash'ari
- Original title: رسالة استحسان الخوض في علم الكلام
- Translator: Richard J. McCarthy
- Language: Arabic, English
- Subject: Kalam (rationalistic theology)
- Publisher: Imprimerie Catholique, 1953; Dar al-Mashari', 1995; Dar al-Kutub al-'Ilmiyya, 2011
- Preceded by: Maqalat al-Islamiyyin wa Ikhtilaf al-Musallin
- Followed by: Al-Luma' fi al-Radd 'ala Ahl al-Zaygh wa al-Bida' ("The Gleams/Illuminations on the Refutation of the People of Deviation/Perversity and Heresies")
- Published for the first time in Hyderabad, India in 1323 AH (1905/1906 AD) and again in 1344 AH (1925/1926 AD).

Al-Hath 'ala al-Bahth (Arabic: الحث على البحث, lit. 'The Encouragement/Exhortation to Investigation/Research'), better known as Risalat Istihsan al-Khawd fi 'Ilm al-Kalam (Arabic: رسالة استحسان الخوض في علم الكلام, lit. 'Treatise on the Appropriateness/Permissibility of Dealing with the Science of Kalam') is a brief treatise written by the Sunni theologian Abu al-Hasan al-Ash'ari (d. 324/935), in which he defends the use of kalam (speculative or dialectical theology) and its rational methods, and discusses the antagonism between nazar (consideration) (Note: The Arabic term nazar, which is being translated here as “consideration,” means to look, to gaze, to inspect, to investigate. For the proponents of Kalam, it denotes the process of investigation and reasoning whereby conclusions are drawn.) and taqlid (in this context means “blind imitation” or following the opinion and practice of others unquestionably, without due inquiry).

Unlike ultra-traditionalists, al-Ash'ari considered debate, inquiry or argument, and use of the tools of logic, sense and reason in religious matters, including the matter of the doctrines of the faith as permissible, citing evidences from the Qur'an and the Sunnah that supports and endorses dialectical rational thinking, logical reasoning, and critical examination and analysis in theology.

== Content ==
In this work, al-Ash'ari reflected himself as opposed to the ultra-traditionalists, literalists or fundamentalists (probably some of those associated with the Hanbali school), and described them as being ignorant, unable to rationalize or inquire into religious matters, and inclined to blind imitation of authority.

Beginning with a widespread critique of systematic theological reflection, the text responds from several perspectives to “objections” posed by opponents of kalām, offering a concise summary of one major systematic theological method.

Al-Ash'ari defended kalam and mutakallimun (dialectic theologians), which means he gave strong recommendation on reason. To him, the basic principles, the objectives, and the method of kalam were generally present in the Qur'an and traditions. Al-Ash'ari emphasized that Qur'an and Hadith never neglect the role of reason and allow speculative thinking (nazar) and rational inference to be implemented. (Note: In reconciling the position of revelation and reason, al-Ash'ari gave priority to revelation. He acknowledged the competence of reason in defending the doctrines of faith, but he did not overlook the real sources of these doctrines. According to al-Ash'ari, in a situation where revelation and reason are in conflict, revelation must be given a priority. Al-Ash'ari held that revelation is a more fundamental source of ultimate truth and reality, and reason merely confirms what is given in revelation due to its insufficiency. Knowledge, such as the nature of God, which cannot be comprehended by reason, is available to us through revelation. Therefore, al-Ash'ari as a Sunni scholar was expected to prioritize revelation over reason upon the conflict between the two. Al-Ash'ari was opposed to Mu'tazila who claimed for priority of reason over revelation.)

Why, then, do you hinder (people from engaging in) kalam? You use it yourselves when you want to; but when you are silenced/confounded (in a discussion), you say: We are forbidden to engage in kalam. And when you want to, you blindly and unquestioningly follow your predecessors, without argument or explanation. This is capriciousness/arbitrariness and wilfulness! Then one should say to them: The Prophet did not discuss vows and testamentary injunctions, or manumission, or the manner of reckoning the uninterrupted transmission of estates, nor did he compose a book about those things, as did Mālik, and al-Thawri, and al-Shafi'i, and Abu Hanifa. Hence, you are forced to admit that they were deviating innovators, since they did what the Prophet had not done, and said what he had not said explicitly, and composed what the Prophet had not composed, and said that those who maintain that the Qur'an is created are to be called unbelievers, though the Prophet did not say that. (Note: Al-Ash'ari tries to prove that his opponents accepted some other concepts introduced into the religion and for which there is no explicit text like a verse or a hadith, such as the blasphemous nature of claiming that the Qur'an was created. The argument of the declaration of unbelief of the one who says that the Qur'an is created is effective here because both al-Ash'ari and his opponents agreed that it was unbelief to profess that the Qur'an is created, in spite of the fact that this was not something said or professed by the Prophet.) — Al-Ash'ari, Istihsan al-Khawd fi 'Ilm al-Kalam

== Translation ==
The treatise was translated into English in 1953 by Richard J. McCarthy and published under the title of The Theology of al-Ashʻarī: The Arabic Texts of al-Ashʻarī's Kitāb al-Luma' and Risālat Istiḥsān al-Khawḍ fi 'Ilm al-Kalām.

== Exposition ==
Samir al-Qadi, a student of 'Abdullah al-Harari, wrote a commentary on the treatise, entitled Idah al-Maram min Risalat al-Ash'ari al-Imam (Arabic: إيضاح المرام من رسالة الأشعري الإِمام). First published in 2017 in Lebanon by Dar al-Mashari'.

== Reception and influence ==
Al-Bayhaqi (d. 458/1066) frequently quotes al-Ash'ari in al-Asma' wa al-Sifat. He apparently narrated from al-Ash'ari's treatise Istihsan al-Khawd fi 'Ilm al-Kalam ("The Endorsement of the Study of Dialectic Theology").

== See also ==
- Maqalat al-Islamiyyin wa Ikhtilaf al-Musallin
- Tabyin Kadhib al-Muftari
- Mujarrad Maqalat al-Ash'ari
- Daf' Shubah al-Tashbih
- List of Sunni books
- Kalam cosmological argument
