= Al-Insaf fima Yajib I'tiqaduh =

Theological book

- Equity in What Must Be Believed In
- Editor: Muhammad Zahid al-Kawthari
- Author: Abu Bakr al-Baqillani
- Original title: الإنصاف فيما يجب اعتقاده و لا يجوز الجهل به
- Language: Arabic
- Subject: 'Aqida, Tawhid, Usul al-Din, Kalam (Islamic theology)
- Publisher: Al-Maktaba al-Azhariyya lil-Turath, Dar al-Kutub al-'Ilmiyah
- Publication place: Iraq
- Followed by: Tamhid al-Awa'il wa Talkhis al-Dala'il

Al-Insaf fima Yajib I'tiqaduh walā Yajūz al-Jahl bih (Arabic: الإنصاف فيما يجب اعتقاده ولا يجوز الجهل به, lit. 'Equity in What Must Be Believed In, and May Not Be Ignorant About'), is an Islamic theological book, written by the Maliki-Ash'ari scholar Abu Bakr al-Baqillani (d. 403/1013), as a methodical refutation against the Mu'tazilis and the Anthropomorphists (al-Mushabbiha).

As an Ash'ari theologian, al-Baqillani disproved some theological doctrines formulated by these groups in dealing with a number of theological topics; the speech of God, the Qur'an and its characteristics, and other attributes of God. The Anthropomorphists believed that God is in the form of corporeal bodies together with their parts. He has hands, head, tongue, and other organs. Their notion is centralized to the doctrine that God has bodily materials. This doctrine was strongly rejected by al-Baqillani. His theological position takes the combination between rationalistic method and application of the revelation.

Al-Baqillani also elucidated his stance concerning mutashabihat verses (uncertain or doubtful passages whose meaning is open to two or more interpretations) which were literally understood by the Anthropomorphists. He analyzed verse (5) of Surat Taha, in which he commented that the God's istiwa' (God's "being established" on the Throne) is not similar with His creatures. (Note: Abu Mansur al-Baghdadi (d. 429/1037) in his al-Farq bayn al-Firaq (The Difference between the Sects) reports that 'Ali ibn Abi Talib, said: "God created the Throne as an indication of His power, not for taking it as a place for Himself." As for God's "being established" on the Throne, this denotes His assumption of authority of His created world. ‘Arsh (the Supreme Throne) implies God's full control of, and authority over, the universe.) He believed that the throne has neither space nor place because God continuously exists, as he noted:

And we say: His istiwa' is not the similar to any creatures. And we do not say: the throne is a place of settlement or rest for Allah, because Allah the Almighty exists without place. When he created place His existence is eternal, not changing.

He also said:

Allah is clear from being in directions, or resembling the creations, and also He is not attributed with transformation or movement, nor with standing or sitting, as per His words: “There is nothing whatever like Him” [Qur'an 42:11] and “And there is none comparable to Him” [Qur'an 112:4], because such attributes are of the creations, and Allah (the Creator) is clear from that.

== Content ==
Al-Baqillani demonstrates that:

- Allah/God is supremely clear of all boundaries, He is not in a place nor in a direction. Motion and change in location do not apply to Him, nor does ignorance, lie or any other attribute of imperfection. He is seen by the believers in the afterlife.
- The Divine Attributes of Allah/God are in no way conceived as limbs (physical body parts like humans).

And other foundational Ash'ari beliefs.

== See also ==
- Asas al-Taqdis
- Al-Baz al-Ashhab
- Tabyin Kadhib al-Muftari
- The Moderation in Belief
- A Guide to Conclusive Proofs for the Principles of Belief
- List of Sunni books
