= Ibn Furak =

10th-century Sunni imam and theologian

Imam Ibn Fūrāk ابن فورك
- Title: Al-Ḥāfiẓ

Personal life
- Born: 941 Isfahan
- Died: 1015 (aged 73–74) Nishapur
- Cause of death: assassinated
- Resting place: al-Hira
- Era: Islamic golden age
- Region: Khorasan
- Main interest(s): Theology (Kalam), Logic, Islamic Jurisprudence, Hadith, Arabic grammar
- Notable work(s): Mujarrad Maqalat al-Shaykh Abi al-Hasan al-Ash'ari ("Summary of Shaykh Abi al-Hasan al-Ash'ari's Treatises/Articles"), Mushkil al-Hadith wa Bayanuh ("Ambiguity of the Hadith and its Explanation")

Religious life
- Religion: Islam
- Denomination: Sunni
- Jurisprudence: Shafi'i
- Creed: Ash'ari

Muslim leader
- Influenced by: Al-Shafi'i Abu Hasan al-Ash'ari Abu al-Hasan al-Bahili Baqillani
- Influenced: Qushayri Al-Bayhaqi

Muhammad ibn al-Hasan ibn Fūrāk, Abū Bakr al-Asbahānī al-Shāfi`ī, commonly known as Ibn Fūrāk (Arabic: ابن فورك); c. 941–c. 1015 CE / 330–406 AH). The Imam, a leading authority on kalam and usul, the transmitter of Al-Ash`ari's school, an expert in Arabic language, grammar and poetry, an orator, a jurist, and a hadith master from the Shafi'i Madhhab in 10th century.

== Life ==
=== Birth and Education ===
Ibn Furak was born in around 941 CE (330 AH) in Isfahan. He studied the Ash'ari theology under Abu al-Hasan al-Bahili along with Al-Baqillani and Abu Ishaq al-Isfarayini in Basra and Baghdad, and also prophetic traditions under 'Abd Allah bin Ja'far al-Isbahani. From 'Iraq he went to Rayy, then to Nishapur, where a madrasa was built for him beside the Khanqah of the Sufi al-Bushandji. He was in Nishapur before the death of the Sufi Abu 'Uthman al-Maghribi in 373/983, and the saint would instruct Ibn Furak to lead the burial prayer over him prior to his death.

=== Scholarly career ===
Ibn Furak was the teacher and master of al-Qushayri and al-Bayhaqi who both would frequently cite in their popular works Al-Risala and Al-Asma' wa al-Sifat, respectively. He debated and won against the anthropomorphist Karramiyya in Rayy, then he travelled to Nishapur where he trained and taught the next generation of jurists at a school established in his honour, which was an extension of the previous Sufi school (Khanqah) built by Abû al-Hasan al-Bushanji. In Nishapur, he brought the transmissions of the narrators of Basra and Baghdad, both from Iraq, and also authored a number of books in various fields and Islamic sciences.

=== Dispute and Death ===
The Karramiyya tried to initially have him executed by the Sultan Mahmud of Ghazni but failed after the Sultan summoned him to Ghazni and questioned him then exonerated him of the erroneous charges they had brought against him as Ibn Furak was found innocent from the false accusations laid out by his enemies. However, upon returning from Ghazni, he was poisoned by the angered Karramiyya, fell on the road, and died in 1015 CE (406 AH) while another version says that he was attacked from behind from them. He was carried back to Nishapur and buried in al-Hira. According to Ibn Asakir, the grave of Ibn Furak is a place where people go to seek healing (istishfâ') and have their prayers granted.

== Controversy over Ibn Furak ==
Al-Dhahabi mentions Ibn Furak in a short reference stating some inaccurate and defaming reports from Ibn Hazm, without questioning their intent where Ibn Furak was unjustly accused of claiming the prophethood ends after the death of Muhammad and other slanders that accuse him of disbelief. Despite this, Al-Dhahabi goes on to say: "Ibn Furak was better than Ibn Hazm, of a greater stature (rank among scholars) and better belief (creed)."

Ibn al-Subki provided evidence that this statement by Ibn Hazm were "anti-Ash'ari fabrications and forgeries" falsely attributed to Ibn Furak. He showed how these reports were refuted by Al-Qushayri and Ibn al-Salah. Ibn al-Subki then quotes Ibn Furak's own words testifying his true creed. Ibn Furak says:

“The Ash'ari belief (creed) is that our prophet (ﷺ) is alive in his Blessed Grave and is the Messenger of Allah (God), forever until the End of times, this is literally, not metaphorically or symbolically, and the correct Belief is that he (Prophet Muhammad ﷺ) was a Prophet when Adam (ﷺ) was between Water and Clay, and his Prophethood remains until now, and shall ever remain.”

== Character ==
According to the martyred Imam Abu al-Hajjaj Yusuf ibn Dunas al-Findalawi al-Maliki, Ibn Furak would always sleep elsewhere out of reverence for a house that cantained a volume of the Qur'an.

== Works ==
Ibn Furak's works in "Usul al-Din" (foundation of religion), "Usul al-fiqh" (foundation of jurisprudence), and the meanings of the Quran count nearly one hundred volumes. Among them are Mujarrad Maqalat al-Ash'ari and Kitab Mushkil al-hadith wa-bayanihi (with many variants of the title), in which he refuted both the anthropomorphist tendencies of karramis and the over-interpretation of the Mu'tazila. Ibn Furak said that he embarked on the study of kalam because of the hadîth reported from Muhammad.

His main work in the eyes of later generations is Tabaqat al-mutakallimin which is the main source to study al-Ash'ari theology.

== Early Islam scholars ==
Early Islamic scholars

Muhammad, The final Messenger of God (570–632) the Constitution of Medina, taught the Quran, and advised his companions
Abdullah ibn Masud (died 653) taught	Ali (607–661) fourth caliph taught	Aisha, Muhammad's wife and Abu Bakr's daughter taught	Abd Allah ibn Abbas (618–687) taught	Zayd ibn Thabit (610–660) taught	Umar (579–644) second caliph taught	Abu Hurairah (603–681) taught
Alqama ibn Qays (died 681) taught	Husayn ibn Ali (626–680) taught	Qasim ibn Muhammad ibn Abi Bakr (657–725) taught and raised by Aisha	Urwah ibn Zubayr (died 713) taught by Aisha, he then taught	Said ibn al-Musayyib (637–715) taught	Abdullah ibn Umar (614–693) taught	Abd Allah ibn al-Zubayr (624–692) taught by Aisha, he then taught
Ibrahim al-Nakha’i taught	Ali ibn Husayn Zayn al-Abidin (659–712) taught	Hisham ibn Urwah (667–772) taught	Ibn Shihab al-Zuhri (died 741) taught	Salim ibn Abd-Allah ibn Umar taught	Umar ibn Abdul Aziz (682–720) raised and taught by Abdullah ibn Umar
Hammad ibn Abi Sulayman taught	Muhammad al-Baqir (676–733) taught	Farwah bint al-Qasim Jafar's mother
Abu Hanifa (699–767) wrote Al Fiqh Al Akbar and Kitab Al-Athar, jurisprudence followed by Sunni, Sunni Sufi, Barelvi, Deobandi, Zaidiyyah and originally by the Fatimid and taught	Zayd ibn Ali (695–740)	Ja'far bin Muhammad Al-Baqir (702–765) Muhammad and Ali's great great grand son, jurisprudence followed by Shia, he taught	Malik ibn Anas (711–795) wrote Muwatta, jurisprudence from early Medina period now mostly followed by Maliki Sunnis in North Africa, and taught	Al-Waqidi (748–822) wrote history books like Kitab al-Tarikh wa al-Maghazi, student of Malik ibn Anas	Abu Muhammad Abdullah ibn Abdul Hakam (died 829) wrote biographies and history books, student of Malik ibn Anas
Abu Yusuf (729–798) wrote Usul al-fiqh	Muhammad al-Shaybani (749–805)	al-Shafi‘i (767–820) wrote Al-Risala, jurisprudence followed by Shafi'i Sunnis and Sufis, and taught	Ismail ibn Ibrahim	Ali ibn al-Madini (778–849) wrote The Book of Knowledge of the Companions	Ibn Hisham (died 833) wrote early history and As-Sirah an-Nabawiyyah, Muhammad's biography
Isma'il ibn Ja'far (719–775)	Musa al-Kadhim (745–799)	Ahmad ibn Hanbal (780–855) wrote Musnad Ahmad ibn Hanbal jurisprudence followed by Hanbali Sunnis and Sufis	Muhammad al-Bukhari (810–870) wrote Sahih al-Bukhari hadith books	Muslim ibn al-Hajjaj (815–875) wrote Sahih Muslim hadith books	Dawud al-Zahiri (815–883/4) founded the Zahiri school	Muhammad ibn Isa at-Tirmidhi (824–892) wrote Jami` at-Tirmidhi hadith books	Al-Baladhuri (died 892) wrote early history Futuh al-Buldan, Genealogies of the Nobles
Ibn Majah (824–887) wrote Sunan ibn Majah hadith book	Abu Dawood (817–889) wrote Sunan Abu Dawood Hadith Book
Muhammad ibn Ya'qub al-Kulayni (864- 941) wrote Kitab al-Kafi hadith book followed by Twelver Shia	Muhammad ibn Jarir al-Tabari (838–923) wrote History of the Prophets and Kings, Tafsir al-Tabari	Abu al-Hasan al-Ash'ari (874–936) wrote Maqālāt al-islāmīyīn, Kitāb al-luma, Kitāb al-ibāna 'an usūl al-diyāna
Ibn Babawayh (923–991) wrote Man La Yahduruhu al-Faqih jurisprudence followed by Twelver Shia	Sharif Razi (930–977) wrote Nahj al-Balagha followed by Twelver Shia	Nasir al-Din al-Tusi (1201–1274) wrote jurisprudence books followed by Ismaili and Twelver Shia	Al-Ghazali (1058–1111) wrote The Niche for Lights, The Incoherence of the Philosophers, The Alchemy of Happiness on Sufism	Rumi (1207–1273) wrote Masnavi, Diwan-e Shams-e Tabrizi on Sufism
Key: Some of Muhammad's Companions	Key: Taught in Medina	Key: Taught in Iraq	Key: Worked in Syria	Key: Travelled extensively collecting the sayings of Muhammad and compiled books of hadith	Key: Worked in Persia

== See also ==
- List of Ash'aris
- List of Muslim theologians

== Bibliography ==
- R. Y., Ebied & Van Renterghem, Vanessa (1960–2005). "Ibn Fūrak". The Encyclopaedia of Islam, Second Edition (12 vols.). Leiden: E. J. Brill. doi:10.1163/1573-3912_islam_COM_032.
- Al-Bayhaqi (1999). Allah's Names and Attributes. Vol. 4 of Islamic Doctrines & Beliefs. Translated by Gibril Fouad Haddad. Islamic Supreme Council of America. p. 26-28. ISBN 9781930409033.
- Gibril Fouad Haddad (2 May 2015). "Ibn Furak (330 AH – 406 AH, 73-74 years old)". The Biographies of the Elite Lives of the Scholars, Imams & Hadith Masters. As-Sunnah Foundation of America. pp. 155–158.
