= Al-Sayf al-Saqil fi al-Radd ala Ibn Zafil =

Al-Sayf al-Saqil fi al-Radd 'ala Ibn Zafil (Arabic: السيف الصقيل في الرد على ابن زفيل, lit. 'The Burnished Sword in Refuting Ibn Zafil [derogatory name for Ibn al-Qayyim]'), is a theological book, written by the Shafi'i-Ash'ari scholar Taqi al-Din al-Subki (d. 756/1355), as a refutation against Ibn al-Qayyim's poem entitled al-Kafiya al-Shafiya fi al-Intisar lil-Firqa al-Najiya (Arabic: الكافية الشافية في الانتصار للفرقة الناجية, lit. 'The Sufficient and Healing [Poem] on the Victory of the Saved Sect'), known popularly as al-Qasida al-Nuniyya (Arabic: القصيدة النونية, lit. 'Ode Rhyming in the Letter Nun [N]'). (Note: Al-Kafiya is a long didactical poem which is, in fact, a polemic theological piece against the Ash'aris. In this work, Ibn al-Qayyim most definitely expanded several of the Taymiyyan theological perceptions. According to Gibril Fouad Haddad, the poem could not be openly circulated in Ibn al-Qayyim's lifetime, but only secretly. Nuh Keller states: An unfortunate peculiarity that the poem shares with some of Ibn al-Qayyim's other works on Islamic Faith - is that it presents the reader with a false dilemma, namely - that one must either believe that Allah (God) has eyes, hands, a descending motion, and so forth, in a literal sense, or else one has nullified ('attala) or negated these Attributes. And this is erroneous, for the literal is that which corresponds to an expression’s primary lexical sense as ordinarily used in a language by the people who speak it, while the above words are clearly intended otherwise, in accordance with the [Qur'anic] verse (There is nothing whatsoever like unto Him) [42:11], for if the above were intended literally, there would be innumerable things like unto Him in such respect as having eyes, hands, motion, and so forth, in the literal meaning of these terms. The would-be dilemma is also far from the practice of the early Muslims, who used only to accept such [Qur'anic] verses and hadiths as they have come, consigning the knowledge of what is meant by them – while affirming the absolute Transcendence of Allah Most High above any resemblance to created things – to Allah Most High alone, without trying to determinately specify how they are meant (Bila Kayf), let alone suggesting people understand them literally as Ibn al-Qayyim tried to do.)

Al-Subki considered the poem to be blasphemous due to its ideological practice of takfir (excommunication of other Muslims), and due to its theological deviations about the Divine Attributes, i.e., anthropomorphism and anthropopathism.

Al-Subki purposely cited sections of the poem and also referred to Ibn Taymiyya. He strove to disqualify the derogatory designations used by Ibn al-Qayyim when he referred to the Ash'aris as Jahmiyya and Mu'attila, etc. Moreover, al-Subki explored several theological aspects concerning God's entity and His Attributes in terms of figurative interpretation (ta'wil) and also deals with eschatological issues.

The book was re-edited and commented on by Hanafi-Maturidi scholar Muhammad Zahid al-Kawthari (d. 1371/1951), under the title of Tabdid al-Zalam al-Mukhim min Nuniyyat Ibn al-Qayyim (Arabic: تبديد الظلام المخيم من نونية ابن القيم).

The Hanafi hadith scholar Murtada al-Zabidi (d. 1205/ 1791) — in the introduction to his book Ithaf al-Sada al-Muttaqin (commentary on Ihya' 'Ulum al-Din by al-Ghazali) — quoted at some length from the refutation written by al-Subki.

== See also ==
- Al-Baz al-Ashhab
- Ta'sis al-Taqdis
- List of Sunni books
