= Maqalat al-Islamiyyin =

Heresiographical book by Abu al-Hasan al-Ash'ari

Maqalat al-Islamiyyin wa Ikhtilaf al-Musallin (Arabic: مقالات الإسلاميين واختلاف المصلين, lit. 'The Treatises/Teachings of the Muslims and the Differences of the Prayerful/Worshippers') is one of the main heresiographical works of early Islamic sects written by the Sunni scholar Abu al-Hasan al-Ash'ari (d. 324/935), the eponym of the Ash'ari theological school.

Most likely, al-Ash'ari wrote this book following the Mu'tazili theologian Abu al-Qasim al-Balkhi (d. 319/931) in his book with the same title (Maqalat al-Islamiyyin). (Note: Al-Ash'ari refuted Abu al-Qasim al-Balkhi's work Awa'il al-Adilla in his Naqd Ta'wil al-Adilla 'alā al-Balkhi, where he attacked Mu'tazili theological principles as presented in al-Balkhi's work, Uyun al-Masa'il wa al-Jawābāt.) Therefore, it was probably written during his Mu'tazili period and then modified; thus it may incorporate parts which he wrote earlier when he was still a Mu'tazili. However, according to al-Dhahabi (d.748/1348), this book was written in his last years, which indicates tolerance with Islamic sects, because Islam contains them.

== Content ==
Al-Ash'ari first gives an objective account of the views of the Muslim sects; then he gives the views of non-Muslim sects and of the philosophers; and finally he gives a critical discussion of the attributes and the names of God.

It is in two parts, the first a short account of the historical origins of schism in Islam and a long patient listing of the major groups of his day, and the second a thematic tabulation of the various questions debated among Muslim intellectuals.

Al-Ash'ari's Maqalat does not contain criticism to any notable degree. As its title indicates, all those who are included in the work are regarded as Muslims and 'those who pray', and so the work is a somewhat impartial survey rather than an appraisal of correct and incorrect doctrines. It serves as a handbook of theological views that might aid the reader in knowing what particular sects and individuals thought, and then what range of opinions was offered on the various questions debated within theology.

== Reception and influence ==
This work became a model for similar works produced afterward, such as al-Farq bayna al-Firaq by 'Abd al-Qahir al-Baghdadi (d. 429/1037), al-Tabsir fi al-Din by Abu al-Muzaffar al-Isfarayini (d. 471/1078), al-Milal wa al-Nihal by al-Shahrastani (d. 548/1153), and I'tiqadat Firaq al-Muslimin wa al-Mushrikin by Fakhr al-Din al-Razi (d. 606/1210).

Ahmad al-Tayyib, the Grand Imam of al-Azhar, highly praised the book by saying that it has several words that deserve to be written in gold water.

== Notes ==
- Al-Ash'ari also composed a lost and little-known work, entitled Maqalat Ghayr al-Islamiyyin (The Teachings of Non-Muslims).

== See also ==
- Risalat Istihsan al-Khawd fi 'Ilm al-Kalam
- Tabyin Kadhib al-Muftari
- Mujarrad Maqalat al-Ash'ari
- Al-Asma' wa al-Sifat
- List of Sunni books
