= Asas al-Taqdis =

Book by Fakhr al-Din al-Razi

Asās al-Taqdīs (Arabic: أساس التقديس, lit. 'The Foundation of Declaring Allah's Transcendence'), also known as Ta'sis al-Taqdis (Arabic: تأسيس التقديس, lit. 'The Establishment of the Sacred') is an Islamic theological book, written by the Shafi'i-Ash'ari scholar Fakhr al-Din al-Razi (d. 606/1209), as a methodical refutation of the Karramiyya and other anthropomorphists.

Fakhr al-Din al-Razi wrote this work to counter the book Kitab al-Tawhid composed by the ultra-traditionalist Ibn Khuzayma (d. 311/923). He referred to Ibn Khuzayma as 'the corporealist' (al-mujassim).

He said in the book's introduction that he dedicated it especially to the Just King and the brother of Saladin, Sultan Abu Bakr ibn Ayyub.

== Content ==
The first part of the book opens with a categorical rejection of any corporeality regarding God, under the title of "Indications on God's Transcendence beyond Corporeality and on Him not Being Confined [by any spatial location]". That is, in fact, his definition of anthropomorphism: al-Razi maintains that the one God is not present in a direction; He is not a space-occupying entity and is not a body, an assertion for which he provides proofs based on rational and textual evidence.

Al-Razi raises numerous claims, which he then refutes. The claims he contradicts are namely those held by the corporealist Karramites and the ultra-traditionalists who affirmed God's direction (jiha) and its veridical meaning (as haqiqa: truth, reality). In his discussion al-Razi articulates the Ash'ari stance on this matter and explains the proper figurative interpretation (ta'wil), according to his opinion.

== Criticism ==
Ibn Taymiyya (d. 728/1328) and his student Ibn al-Qayyim (d. 751/1350) criticized and attacked the book. Ibn Taymiyya wrote a critical response to the book, entitled al-Ta'sis fi Radd Asas al-Taqdis (Arabic: التأسيس في رد أساس التقديس), better known as Bayan Talbis al-Jahmiyya (Arabic: بيان تلبيس الجهمية, lit. 'Explication of the Deceit of the Jahmiyya'), defended the position that God is spatially extended and a body with parts (note that he refuses the word part or limbs and calls them Sifat al-A'yan, A'yan means entities, as opposed to Sifat Ma'na which subsist in the Essence and not entities on their own).

== See also ==
- Daf' Shubah al-Tashbih
- Al-Sayf al-Saqil fi al-Radd ala Ibn Zafil
- Tabyin Kadhib al-Muftari
- Al-Insaf fima Yajib I'tiqaduh
- The Moderation in Belief
- List of Sunni books
