= Abi al-Hasan al-Ash'ari Center for Theological Studies and Research =

Research center in Tétouan, Morocco

- مركز أبي الحسن الأشعري للدراسات والبحوث العقدية
- Named after: Abu al-Hasan al-Ash'ari
- Established: March 2011; 15 years ago
- Type: Nonprofit
- Purpose: Kalam (Islamic theology)
- Location: Tétouan, Morocco
- Official languages: Arabic, French, and English
- Leader: Jamal 'Allal al-Bakhti
- Parent organization: Muhammadan League of Religious Scholars
- Website: www.arrabita.ma/achaari

Markaz Abī al-Hasan al-Ashʻarī lil-Dirāsāt wal-Buhūth al-'Aqdiyya (Arabic: مركز أبي الحسن الأشعري للدراسات والبحوث العقدية, lit. 'Abi al-Hasan al-Ash'ari Center for Theological Studies and Research') is an Islamic research center affiliated with the Muhammadan League of Religious Scholars. It was established in the Moroccan city of Tétouan in March 2011 and is headed by Dr. Jamal 'Allal al-Bakhti, professor of theology at al-Qarawiyyin University.

== Focus ==
The center is particularly interested in the Ash'ari school of thought and its heritage, studying religious manuscripts and scholarly texts of Ash'ari scholars, and conducting studies on Kalam and Islamic theology.

== Published works ==
Title	Author	Editor
Sharh al-Irshad fi Usul al-I'tiqad (Arabic: شرح الإرشاد في أصول الاعتقاد)	Taqi al-Din al-Muqtarah (d. 612/1215–16)	Naziha Ma'arij
Thalāth 'Aqā'id Ash'arīyya (Arabic: ثلاث عقائد أشعرية)	Muhammad ibn Yusuf al-Sanusi (d. 940/1490)	Khalid Zahri
Sharh Murshidat Muhammad ibn Tumart (Arabic: شرح مرشدة محمد بن تومرت)	Muhammad b. Khalil al-Sakuni	Yusuf Ihnana
Juhūd al-Maghāriba fī Khidmat al-Madhhab al-Ash'arī (Arabic: جهود المغاربة في خدمة المذهب الأشعري)		
Al-Maṣādir al-Maghribīyya lil-'Aqīda al-Ash'arīyya (Arabic: المصادر المغربية للعقيدة الأشعرية)		
'Aqidat Abi Bakr al-Murādī al-Hadrami (Arabic: عقيدة أبي بكر المرادي الحضرمي)		Jamal 'Allal al-Bakhti

== See also ==
- Imam Maturidi International Scientific Research Center
