= Ibn al-Jawzi =

Muslim preacher and scholar (c. 1116–1201)

- ابن الجوزي
- Title: Shaykh al-Islam

Personal life
- Born: Abd al-Rahman ibn Ali Al-Jawzi Al-Bakri c. 510 AH/1116 CE Baghdad, Abbasid Caliphate, now Iraq
- Died: 12 Ramadan 597 AH/16 June 1201 (aged approximately 87) Baghdad, Abbasid Caliphate, now Iraq
- Children: Yusuf ibn Abd al-Rahman Al-Jawzi
- Parent: Ali ibn Muhammad Al-Jawzi (father)
- Era: Islamic Golden Age
- Main interest(s): History, Tafsir, Hadith, Fiqh
- Notable work: Kitab Akhbar al-Sifat

Religious life
- Religion: Islam
- Denomination: Sunni
- Lineage: Al-Bakri
- Jurisprudence: Hanbali
- Creed: Ash'ari

Muslim leader
- Influenced: Abd al-Ghani al-Maqdisi, d 600 AH Sibt ibn al-Jawzi, d 654 AH Ibn Qudama al-Maqdisi Diya al-Din al-Maqdisi

Abu al-Faraj Jamal al-Din Abd al-Rahman ibn Abi Hasan Ali Al-Jawzi also known as Ibn al-Jawzi (Note: Arabic: أبو الفرج جمال الدين عبد الرحمن بن أبي الحسن علي بن محمد; Abū al-Faraj ʿAbd al-Raḥmān ibn ʿAlī ibn Muḥammad ibn al-Jawzī) (c. 1116 – 16 June 1201) was a Muslim jurisconsult, preacher, orator, heresiographer, traditionist, historian, judge, hagiographer, and philologist who played an instrumental role in propagating the Hanbali school of orthodox Sunni jurisprudence in his native Baghdad during the twelfth-century. During "a life of great intellectual, religious and political activity," Ibn al-Jawzi came to be widely admired by his fellow Hanbalis for the tireless role he played in ensuring that that particular school – historically, the smallest of the four principal Sunni schools of law – enjoy the same level of "prestige" often bestowed by rulers on the Maliki, Shafi'i, and Hanafi rites.

Ibn al-Jawzi
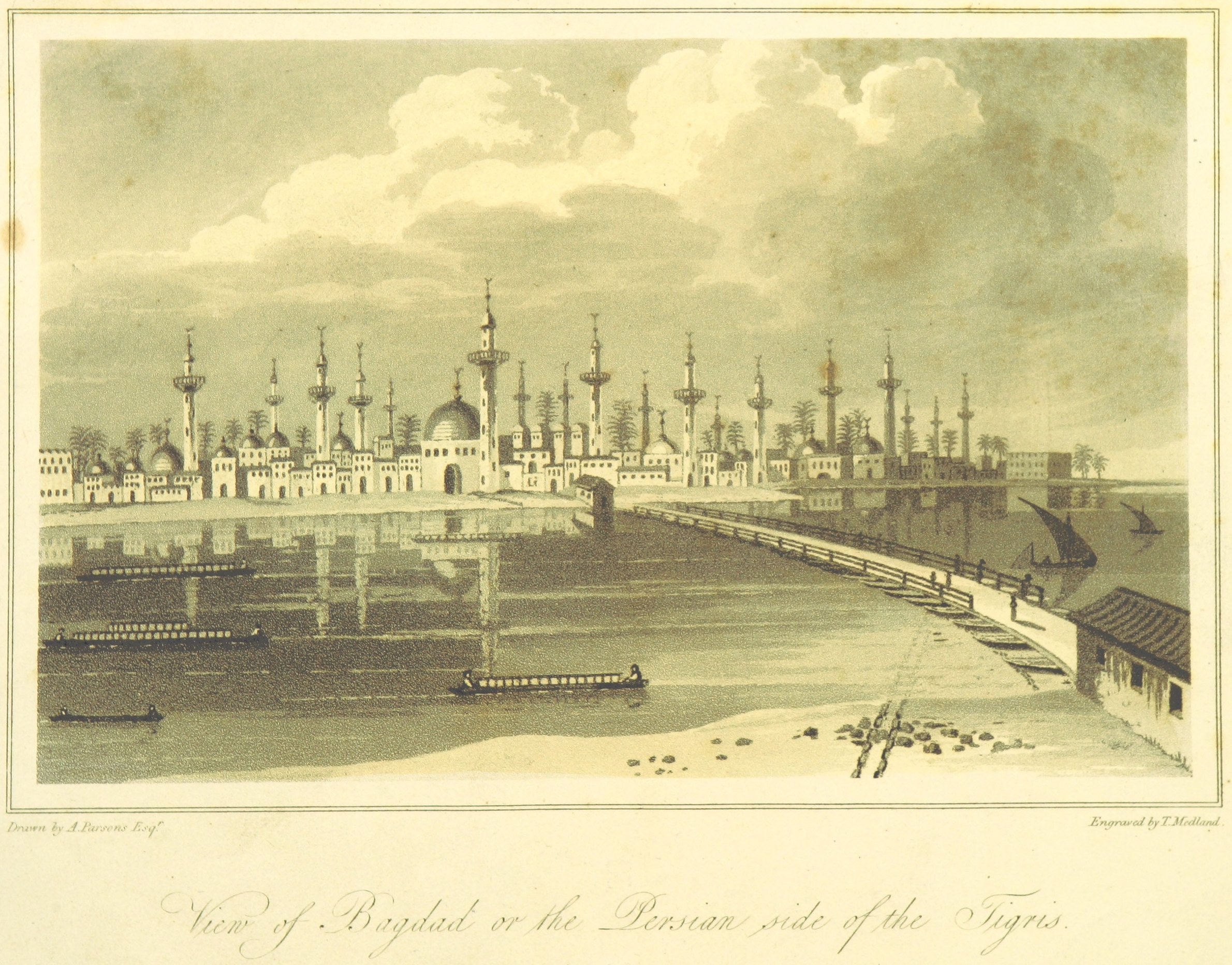
- A depiction of Baghdad from 1808, taken from the print collection in Travels in Asia and Africa, etc. (ed. J. P. Berjew, British Library); Ibn al-Jawzī spent his entire life in this city in the twelfth-century.

Jurisconsult, Preacher, Traditionist; Shaykh of Islam, Orator of Kings and Princes, Imam of the Hanbalites
- Venerated in: Sunni Islam, but particularly in the Hanbali school of jurisprudence
- Major shrine: Green Cement Tomb at Baghdad, Iraq

Ibn al-Jawzi received a "very thorough education" during his adolescent years, and was fortunate to train under some of that era's most renowned Baghdadi scholars, including Ibn al-Zāg̲h̲ūnī (d. 1133), Abū Bakr al-Dīnawarī (d. 1137–8), Sayyid Razzāq Alī Jīlānī (d. 1208), and Abū Manṣūr al-Jawālīkī (d. 1144–5). Although Ibn al-Jawzi's scholarly career continued to blossom over the next few years, he became most famous during the reign of al-Mustadi (d. 1180), the thirty-third Abbasid caliph, whose support for Hanbalism allowed Ibn al-Jawzi to effectively become "one of the most influential persons" in Baghdad, due to the caliph's approval of Ibn al-Jawzi's public sermonizing to huge crowds in both pastoral and urban areas throughout Baghdad. In the vast majority of the public sermons delivered during al-Mustadi's reign, Ibn al-Jawzi often presented a stanch defense of the prophet Muhammad's example, and vigorously criticized all those whom he considered to be schismatics in the faith. At the same time, Ibn al-Jawzi's reputation as a scholar continued to grow due to the substantial role he played in managing many of the most important universities in the area, as well as on account of the sheer number of works he wrote during this period. As regards the latter point, part of Ibn al-Jawzi's legacy rests on his reputation for having been "one of the most prolific writers" of all time. As scholars have noted, Ibn al-Jawzi's prodigious corpus, "varying in length" as it does, touches upon virtually "all the great disciplines" of classical Islamic study.

== Family background and life ==
Abd al-Rahman ibn Ali Al-Jawzi Al-Bakri At-Taymi Al-Qurayshi was born between 507 and 512 AH (1113 and 1119 CE) to a wealthy family in Baghdad, which descended from Abu Bakr As-Siddiq. Ibn al-Jawzi's lineage back to him is as follows: Abd al-Rahman ibn Ali ibn Muhammad ibn Ali ibn Ubayd Allah ibn Abdullah ibn Hammadi ibn Ahmad ibn Muhammad ibn Ja`far al-Jawzi ibn Abdullah ibn al-Qasim ibn al-Nadr ibn al-Qasim ibn Muhammad ibn Abdullah ibn Abd al-Rahman ibn al-Qasim ibn Muhammad ibn Abi Bakr al-Siddiq al-Taymi al-Qurayshi. His ninth-generation forefather, Jafar ibn Abdullah Al-Bakri, was known as al-Jawzi, hence the family name. His family had become wealthy through their involvement in the copper trade, and Al-Jawzi grew up in luxury.

His parents proceeded to give their son a "thorough education" in all the principal disciplines of the period, whence Ibn al-Jawzi had the good fortune of studying under such notable scholars of the time as Ibn al-Zāghūnī (d. 1133), Abū Bakr al-Dīnawarī (d. 1137–8), Shaykh Sayyid Razzaq Ali Gilani (d. 1208), Abū Manṣūr al-Jawālīkī (d. 1144–5), Abu 'l-Faḍl b. al-Nāṣir (d. 1155), Abū Ḥakīm al-Nahrawānī (d. 1161) and Abū Yaʿlā As-Saghir (d. 1163). Additionally, Ibn al-Jawzi began to be heavily influenced by the works of other scholars he read but whom he had never met personally, such as Abu Nu`aym (d. 1038), a Shafi'i Ashari mystic, al-Khatib al-Baghdadi (d. 1071), a Hanbali who had changed to Shafi'ism, and the prominent Hanbali thinker Ibn `Aqīl (d. ca. 1120), whom Ibn al-Jawzi would both praise and criticize in his later writings. He was an adherent of the Ashari school of dialectical theology, an aspect of his thought that would later distinguish him from many of his fellow Hanbali thinkers, In his early works he criticized speculation in theology, in particular modernizing trends among the Sufis.

Ibn al-Jawzi began his career proper during the reign of al-Muqtafi (d. 1160), the thirty-first caliph of the Abbasid Caliphate, whose Hanbali vizier, Ibn Hubayra (d. 1165), served as a patron of Ibn al-Jawzi's scholarship. Beginning his scholarly career as a teaching assistant to his mentor Abū Ḥakīm al-Nahrawānī, who taught Hanbali jurisprudence in two separate schools, Ibn al-Jawzi succeeded al-Nahrawānī as "master of these two colleges" after the latter's death in 1161. A year or so prior to this, however, Ibn al-Jawzi had already begun his career as a preacher, as Ibn Hubayra had given him free rein to deliver his passionate sermons every Friday in the vizer's own house. After al-Muqtafi's death, the succeeding caliph, al-Mustanjid (d. 1170), called upon Ibn al-Jawzi to preach his sermons in the Caliph's palace mosque – one of the most prominent houses of worship in the whole of Baghdad – during the three campaigns of Nur al-Din Zengi against the tottering Fatimid Caliphate. In these sermons, Ibn al-Jawzi is said to have "vigorously defended the prophetic precedent and criticized, not only all those whom he considered to be schismatics, but also the jurists who were too blindly attached to their own schools of law."

During the reign of the succeeding Abbasid caliph, al-Mustadi (d. 1180), Ibn al-Jawzi began to be recognized "as one of the most influential persons in Baghdad." As this particular ruler was especially partial to Hanbalism, Ibn al-Jawzi was given free rein to promote Hanbalism by way of his preaching throughout Baghdad. The numerous sermons Ibn al-Jawzi delivered from 1172 to 1173 cemented his reputation as the premier scholar in Baghdad at the time; indeed, the scholar soon began to be so appreciated for his gifts as an orator that al-Mustadi even went so far as to have a special dais (Arabic dikka) constructed specially for Ibn al-Jawzi in the Palace mosque. Ibn al-Jawzi's stature as a scholar only continued to grow in the following years.

By 1179, Ibn al-Jawzi had written over one hundred and fifty works and was directing five colleges in Baghdad simultaneously. It was at this time that he told al-Mustadi to engrave an inscription onto the widely venerated tomb of Ibn Hanbal (d. 855) – the revered founder of the Hanbali rite – which referred to the famed jurist as "Imām." After the ascendancy of the new caliph, al-Nasir (d. 1235), to the Abbasid throne, Ibn al-Jawzi initially maintained amicable relations with the state power by way of his friendship with the caliph's Hanbali vizier, Ibn Yūnus (d. 1197). However, after the latter's dismissal and arrest – for unknown reasons – the caliph appointed as his successor the Shia Ibn al-Ḳaṣṣāb (d. ca. 1250). Although the reasons for the matter remain unclear in the historical record, al-Nasir eventually sentenced Ibn al-Jawzi to live under house arrest for five years. One of the possible reasons for this may be that Ibn al-Jawzi's relationship with the caliph had soured after the scholar had written a direct refutation of the ruler's policy in a particular matter. After five years in exile, Ibn al-Jawzi was eventually set free due to the pleading of al-Nasir's mother, whom the various chronicles describe as "a very devout woman" who pleaded with her son to free the famous scholar. Soon after his return to Baghdad, however, Ibn al-Jawzi died, being seventy-four years old.

== Views and thought ==
=== Polemics ===
Ibn al-Jawzi was a noted polemicist, and often attacked with great zeal the works of all those whom he deemed to be heretical innovators in the religion. His criticisms of other schools of thought appears most prominently in Talbīs Iblīs (The Devil's Delusion), "one of the major works of Hanbali polemic," in which he staunchly critiqued not only numerous sects outside Sunni Islam, such as the Mutazilites and the Kharijites, but also particular schools of thought within Sunnism who he believed had strayed from the right path. Due to some of Ibn al-Jawzi's remarks against some of the "wayward Sufis" of his time in this work, contemporary Muslim movements opposed to traditional Sufism, such as Salafism and Wahhabism, often cite the work as evidence of their position in the present day. Despite this, scholars have noted how Ibn al-Jawzi never actually attacks Sufism as such, but always makes a clear distinction in his works "between an older purer Sufism" and what he deems to be corruptions in Sufi practice. It is clear that Ibn al-Jawzi never intended his attacks on certain Sufi groups contemporaneous with him to constitute a condemnation of Sufism as a whole.

=== Relics ===
Ibn al-Jawzi was an avid supporter of using the relics of Muhammad in personal devotion, and supported the seeking of blessing through them in religious veneration. This is evident from his approved citing of a tradition narrated by Ibn Hanbal's son Abdullah, who recalled his father's devotion towards the Prophet's relics thus: "I saw my father take one of the Prophet's hairs, place it over his mouth, and kiss it. I may have seen him place it over his eyes, and dip it in water and then drink the water for a cure." In the same way, Ibn al-Jawzi also commended Ibn Hanbal for having drunk from the Prophet's bowl (technically a "second-class" relic) in order to seek blessings from it.

=== Saints ===
Ibn al-Jawzi supported the orthodox and widespread classical belief in the existence of saints, as is evident from his major work on the lives of the early Muslim Sufi saints entitled Sifat al-ṣafwa (The Characteristic of the Elect) – actually an abridgment of Abu Nu`aym's (d. 1038) Ḥilyat al-awliyāʼ (The Adornment of the Saints) – in which he explicitly praises such important Sufis as Hasan of Basra (d. 728), Ibrahim ibn Adham (d. ca. 782), Sufyan al-Thawri (d. 778), Rabia Basri (d. 801), Ma'ruf Karkhi (d. ca. 820), and Bishr the Barefoot (d. ca. 850), among many others. While Ibn al-Jawzi did criticize charlatans who masquerade as holy men, he unreservedly states that true "saints do not violate" orthodox belief, practice, and law. Regarding saints, Ibn al-Jawzi said:

The saints and the righteous are the very purpose of all that exists (al-awliya wa-al-salihun hum al-maqsud min al-kawn): they are those who learned and practiced with the reality of knowledge... Those who practice what they know, do with little in the world, seek the next world, remain ready to leave from one to the other with wakeful eyes and good provision, as opposed to those renowned purely for their knowledge."

=== Sufism ===
Ibn al-Jawzi evidently held that Sufism or tasawwuf was an integral aspect of Islamic practice. As has been noted by scholars, his Talbīs Iblīs, which criticizes innovations in all the major Islamic sciences, including tafsir and fiqh, is by no means a rejection of Sufism as a whole. On the contrary, the Hanbali jurist wrote many books on the merits of the early mystics and saints, including Manaqib Rabi`a al-`Adawiyya, Manaqib Ma`ruf al-Karkhi, Manaqib Ibrahim ibn Adham, Manaqib Bishr al-Hafi, and others. Ibn al-Jawzi was also a staunch supporter of the teachings of Ghazali, and many of the former's works dealing with Sufism are influenced by Ghazali's most famous work, the Iḥyāʾ ʿulūm al-dīn. As a matter of fact, Ibn al-Jawzi frequently adopted the actual "methodology and language of" Ghazali in his works, in addition to writing about the same subject matter. Among the topics Ibn al-Jawzi covered in his mystical works were: the meaning of passionate longing for God; the taking of one's nafs to account for its deeds; the berating of the nafs for its shortcomings; and the castigating of the nafs.

== Creed ==
Ibn al-Ahdal (d. 855/1451) in his Kashf al-Ghata' 'an Haqa'iq al-Tawhid (Arabic: كشف الغطاء عن حقائق التوحيد) considered him one of the Ash'ari scholars along with Abdul Qadir Gilani. However, unlike other Hanbalis, he did not totally reject the mutakalimun and accepted Kalam and Ta'wil when needed depending on the person.

== Theology ==
Ibn al-Jawzi is famous for the theological stance that he took against other Hanbalites of the time, in particular Ibn Hamid al-Warraq, al-Qadi Abu Ya'la ibn al-Farra' and Ibn al-Zaghuni. He believed that these and other Hanbalites had gone to extremes in affirming God's Attributes, so much so that he accused them of tarnishing the reputation of Hanbalites and making it synonymous with extreme anthropomorphism (likening God to his creation). Ibn al-Jawzi stated that,

"They believed that He has a form and a face in addition to His Self. They believed that He has two eyes, a mouth, a uvula and molars, a face which is light and splendor, two hands, including the palms of hands, fingers including the little fingers and the thumbs, a back, and two legs divided into thighs and shanks."

And he continued his attack on Abu Ya'la by stating that, "Whoever confirms that God has molars as a divine attribute, has absolutely no knowledge of Islam."

Ibn al-Jawzi's most famous work in this regard is his Bāz al‐ašhab al‐munqadd 'alà muhālifī al‐madhab (The Gray Falcon Which Attacks the Offenders of the [Hanbalī] School).

=== God is neither inside nor outside the Universe ===
Ibn Jawzi states, in As-Sifat, that God neither exists inside the world nor outside of it. To him, "being inside or outside are concomitant of things located in space" i.e. what is outside or inside must be in a place, and, according to him, this is not applicable to God. He writes:

Both [being in a place and outside a place] along with movement, rest, and other accidents are constitutive of bodies ... The divine essence does not admit of any created entity [e.g. place] within it or inhering in it.

== Works ==
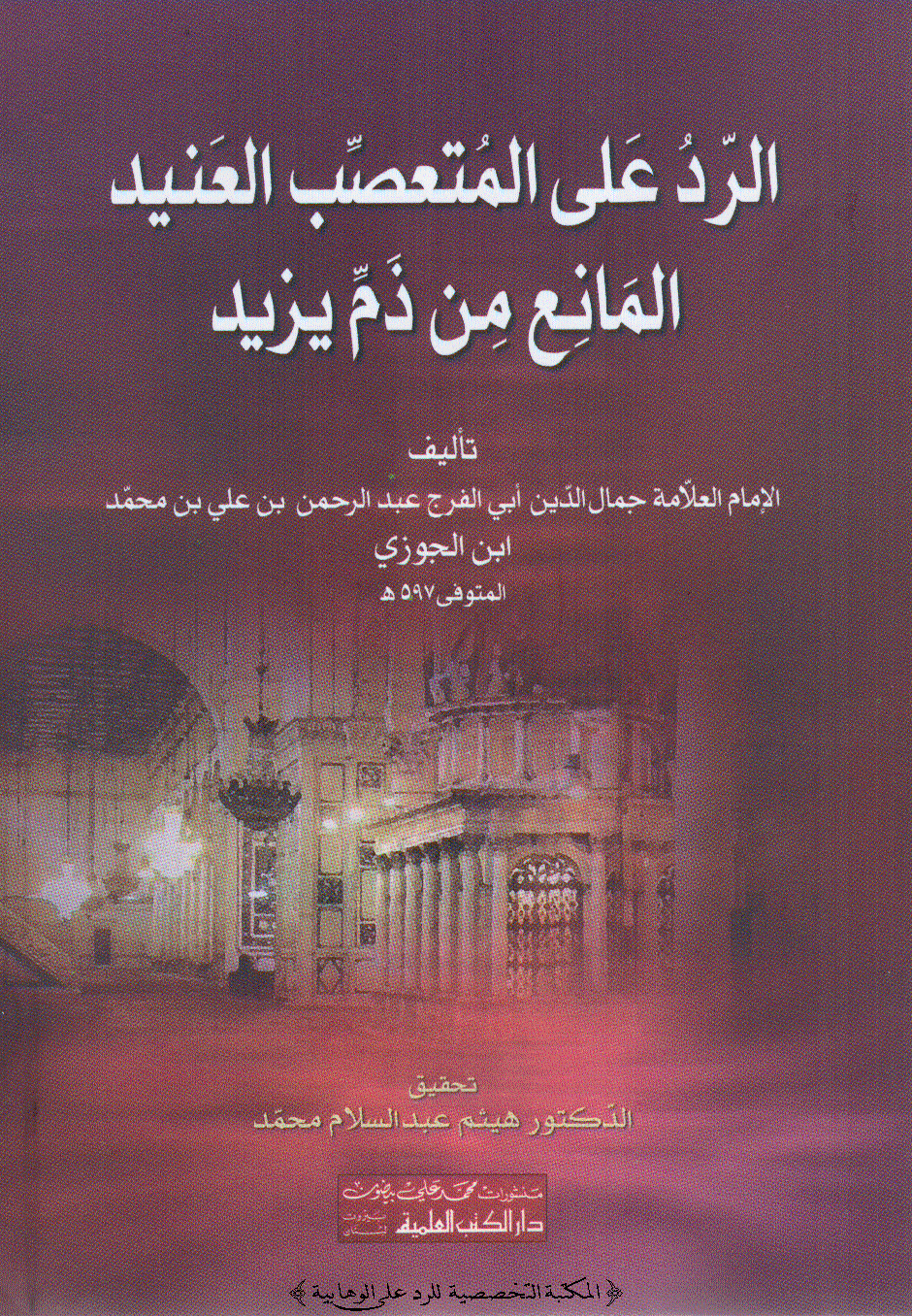
Front cover of Al-Radd 'Ala al-Muta'assib al-'Anid al-Mani' Min Thamm Yazid, published by Dar al-Kutub al-Ilmiya.

Ibn al-Jawzi is perhaps the most prolific author in Islamic history. Al-Dhahabi states: "I have not known anyone amongst the 'ulama to have written as much as he (Ibn al-Jawzi) did. Recently, Professor Abdul Hameed al-Aloojee, an Iraqi scholar conducted research on the extent of ibn al Jawzi's works and wrote a reference work in which he listed Ibn al Jawzees's works alphabetically, identifying the publishers and libraries where his unpublished manuscripts could be found. Some have suggested that he is the author of more than 700 works.

The sheer number of his writings led some scholars to criticize him, to scrutinize his mistakes closely, and to describe him as someone who made many errors. However, Ibn Rajab quoted him as saying, in defense of him: “I am an arranger, not an originator (of new compositions).”

In addition to the topic of religion, Ibn al-Jawzi wrote about medicine as well. Like the medicinal works of Al-Suyuti, Ibn al-Jawzi's book was almost exclusively based on Prophetic medicine rather than a synthesis of both Islamic and Greek medicine like the works of Al-Dhahabi. Ibn al-Jawzi's work focused primarily on diet and natural remedies for both serious ailments such as rabies and smallpox and simple conditions such as headaches and nosebleeds.

- A Great Collection of Fabricated Traditions
- Daf' Shubah al-Tashbih
- Sifatu al-Safwah, five parts, reworking of Hilyat al-Awliya by the 11th century scholar Abu Nu'aym al-Isfahani
- 'Ādāb al-Ḥasan al-Baṣrī wa-Zuhduh wa-Mawaʿiẓuh (The Manners of Hasan al-Basri, his Asceticism, and his Exhortations)
- Zad al-Masir fi Ilm al-Tafsir
- Talbīs Iblīs
- Tadhkirah Uli Al-Basāir fī Ma'rifah Al-Kabāir
- Gharīb Al-Ḥadīth
- Ahkam Al-Nisa
- Molid Al-Urus
- Hifdh Al-'Umr
- Bayan-ul-Miladun-Nabavi'
- Bahr Al-Damou'

== Tomb ==
The tomb of Ibn Al-Jawzi is located at Baghdad, Iraq. The tomb is a simple green cement slab surrounded by rocks, and a paper sign on it indicating it is the tomb. In 2019 rumors spread about the tomb being removed after a photo was released showing the removal of the tomb. However, the Iraqi officials denied it.

== See also ==
- Sibt ibn al-Jawzi
- Ibn 'Aqil
