= Al-Wabil al-Sayyib =

14-century book by Ibn Qayyim Al-Jawziyya

Al-Waabil as-Sayyib min al-Kalim at-Tayyib (Arabic: الوابل الصيب من الكلم الطيب ) is a book by Islamic scholar Ibn Qayyim Al-Jawziyya.

== Description ==
The book describes the essential rudiments of the acts of worship and the correct form of dhikr based on the Quran and Sunnah by the understanding of the companions of the Prophet and the early generations.

== Influences ==
In May 2012, a man in Jeddah, Saudi Arabia was convicted by a Shariah court of beating his wife and putting her in the hospital. As part of the verdict, the man was sentenced to read three books on the Shariah, including "a book on supplications by Ibn Al-Qayyim entitled Al-Wabil Al-Sayyib".

== Translations ==
- "Ibn Qayyim al-Jawziyya on the Invocation of God", translated by Michael Abdurrahman Fitzgerald and Moulay Youssef Slitine, Islamic Texts Society, 2000; ISBN 0-946621-78-0.
- In Arabic الوابل الصيب من الكلم الطيب, Hardcover, 241 pp, Dar Al Kitab Al Arabi, Beirut, 2003

== See also ==
- List of Sunni books
- Also translated to French by Papa Ibrahima Niakhaté, Dar Al-Manarah, Mansoura, Egypt. ISBN 977-6005-52-7, Dar Al-Kutub, number: 9018/ 2011.
