= Wahbi Sulayman Ghawji =

Albanian Muslim scholar

Hajji Wahbi Sulayman Ghawji
- Vehbi Sulejman Gavoçi
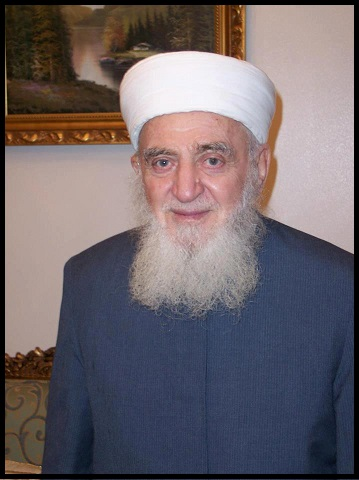
- Wahbi Sulayman Ghawji

Personal life
- Born: 17 May 1923 Shkodër, Principality of Albania
- Died: 19 July 2013 (aged 90) Dubai, United Arab Emirates
- Education: Al-Azhar University
- Occupation: Cleric

Religious life
- Religion: Islam
- Denomination: Sunni
- Jurisprudence: Hanafi
- Creed: Maturidi

Muslim leader
- Influenced: Saeed Fodeh, Mustafa al-Bugha, Muhammad al-Zuhayli, Muhamed Sytari

Hajji Vehbi Sulejman Gavoçi (Arabic: وهبي سليمان غاوجي, May 17, 1923 – July 19, 2013) was an Albanian Muslim scholar from Shkodër.

He was born on May 17, 1923, in the Garuc neighborhood of Shkodër. In June 1937, he emigrated to Damascus, Syria, with his namesake father and his brother Sheikh Muhamed. At the age of thirteen, Vehbi Sulejman Gavoçi enrolled at Al-Azhar University in Cairo, Egypt. After ten years in Egypt, where he graduated from the Al-Azhar Faculty of Sharia and two years of secular law school, he returned to Syria in 1947. Gavoçi taught from 1949 to 1951 at a girls’ school in Aleppo. He moved on to Damascus, teaching from 1951 to 1965 in various schools while lecturing at the Teacher College and Damascus University.

After the death of his father in 1958, Vehbi replaced him as imam at the Arnaut (Albanian) Mosque built by his father in Damascus. Preaching for three years there, he also sermonized at Esh-Shemsije, Randa, and Lala Basha Mosques. In 1966, he left Syria for a post as lecturer at the King Saud University in Riyadh, Saudi Arabia and a professorship at the Islamic University of Madinah in Medina. In 1971, he returned to Syria, continuing to teach there until 1980. From 1980 to 1983, he served once more in Medina, then spent three years in Jordan contributing to various scholarly publications. In 1986, he was appointed a lecturer at the Faculty of Religion and Linguistics in Dubai, United Arab Emirates. He died there on July 19, 2013.

He has published over 20 works in Arabic as well as over 30 in Albanian.

On March 10, 2012, the Shkodër City Council declared him an “honorary citizen.”
