= Reliance of the Traveller =

14th-century Shafi'i fiqh manual

Umdat al-Salik wa Uddat al-Nasik
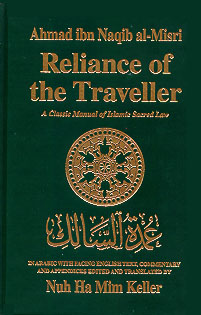
- Reliance of the Traveller, translated by Nuh Ha Mim Keller
- Author: Ahmad ibn Naqib al-Misri
- Translator: Nuh Ha Mim Keller
- Language: Arabic
- Subject: Shafi'i Fiqh
- Publisher: Amana Publications
- English publication date: 1991
- Pages: 1232
- ISBN: 978-0-915957-72-9
- OCLC: 780082934

Umdat as-Salik wa 'Uddat an-Nasik (Reliance of the Traveller and Tools of the Worshipper, also commonly known by its shorter title Reliance of the Traveller) is a classical manual of fiqh for the Shafi'i school of Islamic jurisprudence. The author of the main text is the 14th-century scholar Shihab al-Din Ahmad ibn al-Naqib al-Misri (AH 702–769 / AD 1302–1368). (Note: The Hijri year 769 spans 1367 and 1368 AD.) Al-Misri closely followed the order and conclusions of Nawawi's encyclopedic al-Majmu' , a commentary on Abu Ishaq al-Shirazi's al-Muhadhdhab (The Rarefaction), together with its addendum, the Takmila of Taqi al-Din al-Subki.

In 1991, an English translation by Nuh Ha Mim Keller became the first translation of a standard Islamic legal reference into a European language to be certified by Al-Azhar University in Egypt.

== Keller translation ==
Umdat as-Salik was translated into English by the American Muslim scholar Nuh Ha Mim Keller in 1991 and became the first translation of a standard Islamic legal reference in a European language to be certified by Al-Azhar University; the certification is reproduced in the book. The translation comprises 26 sections titled according to the letters of the English alphabet, Book A, Book B, Book C, etc.

Books A through C contain introductory material forming a guide to fiqh compiled by Keller. Books D through O correspond to the original work of al-Misri, commencing with an "Author's Introduction". Following are translations of a series of shorter works (Books P through V) which address topics such as personal ethics, character, and traditional Islamic Sufism, and include famous classical texts such as Al-Ghazzali's Ihya' 'ulum al-din and Nawawi's Riyadh as-Saaliheen. Book W consists of extensive notes and appendices, Book X offers thumbnail biographies of hundreds of figures mentioned throughout the work, and Books Y and Z conclude it with a bibliography and indexes.

Certain sections of the book were left untranslated, as Keller considered them irrelevant to modern societies. The original Arabic text for these sections is retained in square brackets, but the omissions are not indicated by ellipsis points or other markers in the English text; Keller states in the introduction that this was done "for the sake of fluency and readability". These parts include sections on slavery, describing the rights and duties of slaves and their masters, which a translator's note describes as left untranslated "because the issue is no longer current".

- A. Sacred Knowledge (pg. 1)
- B. The Validity of Following Qualified Scholarship (pg. 15)
- C. The Nature of Legal Rulings (pg. 27)
- D. Author's Introduction to 'Umdat al-Salik (pg. 47)
- E. Purification (pg. 49)
- F. The Prayer (pg. 101)
- G. The Funeral Prayer (pg. 220)
- H. Zakat (pg. 244)
- I. Fasting (pg. 277)
- J. The Pilgrimage (pg. 297)
- K. Trade (pg. 371)
- L. Inheritance (pg. 460)
- M. Marriage (pg. 506)
- N. Divorce (pg. 554)
- O. Justice (pg. 578)
- P. Enormities (pg. 649)
- Q. Commanding the Right and Forbidding the Wrong (pg. 713)
- R. Holding One's Tongue (pg. 726)
- S. Delusions (pg. 777)
- T. A Pure Heart (pg. 796)
- U. The Gabriel Hadith (pg. 807)
- V. Belief in Allah and His Messenger (pg. 816)
- W. Notes and Appendices (pg. 826)
- X. Biographical Notes (pg. 1019)
- Y. Works Cited (pg. 1116)
- Z. Indexes (pg. 1128)

== See also ==
- List of Sunni books
