= Gibril Haddad =

Islamic scholar

Shaykh Gibril Fouad Haddad
- جبريل فؤاد حداد
- Born: 1960 (age 65–66) CE or 1380 AH; Beirut, Lebanon
- Other names: Fouad Haddad; Gabriel Fouad Haddad; G.F. Haddad; Gibril F. Haddad; Gibril Fouad Haddad; Gibril Haddad; GF Haddad; Jibril Fouad Haddad; Jibril Fuad Haddad; Jibril Haddad
- Occupations: Islamic scholar, muhaddith
- Employer: Universiti Brunei Darussalam

Gibril Haddad
- Title: Shaykh

Personal life
- Region: Lebanese scholar
- Main interest(s): Fiqh, Sufism, Aqidah
- Occupation: Islamic Scholar

Religious life
- Religion: Islam
- Denomination: Sunni
- Jurisprudence: Shafi'i
- Tariqa: Naqshbandi
- Creed: Ashari

Gibril Fouad Haddad (born 1960) (Arabic: جبريل فؤاد حداد; Arabic pronunciation: [gɪbriːl fʊɑːd ħadda:d]) is a Lebanese-born Islamic scholar, hadith expert (muhaddith), author, and translator of classical Islamic texts. He was featured in the inaugural list of The 500 Most Influential Muslims and has been called "one of the clearest voices of traditional Islam in the Western world", a "prominent orthodox Sunni" and a "staunch defender of the traditional Islamic schools of law." He holds ijazas from over 150 scholars across the Muslim world. He was a visiting fellow (2013-2015) then senior assistant professor (2015-2018) at the Sultan Omar Ali Saifuddin Center for Islamic Studies, Universiti Brunei Darussalam. He is also a staunch critic of Wahhabism and Salafism.

== Early life ==
Gibril Haddad was born in 1960 in Beirut, Lebanon to a middle-class Lebanese Catholic family. He has described his extended family as a mix of Eastern Orthodox and Roman/Maronite Catholics. He was raised in a mixed neighborhood and attended a Jesuit school that his father and grandfather had attended before him. In 1976, his father died during the Lebanese Civil War and his family was forced to flee Lebanon for the United Kingdom where Haddad completed high school. Later his family moved to the United States where Haddad attended Columbia College in New York City and graduated with a Bachelor of Arts degree. He then returned to Lebanon and got a job at his old school. Two years later, he left Lebanon again and enrolled in a French literature graduate program at Columbia University, New York. Haddad states he spent most of his time after classes at the local church or library and occasionally visited his mother.

== Conversion ==
While in Lebanon Haddad realized that he was a nominal Christian who "did not really live according to what he knew were the norms of his faith." He then decided that whenever the chance came he would try his best to live according to his idea of Christian standards for one year. He tried to do so while he was a student at Columbia University. During that time, one of his American Christian friends converted to Islam. Haddad recalls that this event had a significant impact on him and made him feel envious: “Here was an American embracing the religion of my people - the Arabs - and the religion I felt attached to.” During a year he spent in Paris on a scholarship, Haddad bought a complete set of tapes of the recitation of the Quran. Upon returning to New York, he heard the tapes and paid special attention to the passages that concerned Christians. He recalls that he felt the words of the Quran were those of God but also "squirmed" at some of the "verses of threat". He read many other books about Islam and eventually became dissatisfied with the Christian way of worship. In 1991, he went to a Muslim student group at Columbia University and pronounced the Shahada, thereby formally converting to the Hanafi Sunni branch of Islam.

== Religious education ==
Shortly after his conversion, Haddad met Shaykh Hisham Kabbani of Tripoli who introduced him to the ways of the Naqshbandi Spiritual Order (tariqa). In the month of Ramadan following his conversion, Haddad traveled to London where he met Kabbani's teacher and father-in-law, Shaykh Muhammad Nazim al-Haqqani of Cyprus, and accepted him as his spiritual guide of the Naqshbandi Spiritual Order.

He then moved to Damascus where he studied for about 10 years under many Islamic scholars such as Dr. Nur al-Din `Itr, Shaykh Adib Kallas, Shaykh Wahbi Sulayman al-Ghawji, Shaykh Muhammad al-Yaqoubi, Dr. Samer al-Nass, Dr. Wahba Zuhayli, Shaykh Abd al-Hadi Kharsa, Shaykh Muhammad Muti al-Hafiz, Shaykh Bassam al-Hamzawi and Shaykh Munir al-Hayek. During his time in Damascus, Haddad continued to meet Shaykh Muhammad Nazim al-Haqqani at his home in Cyprus as well as in Damascus. In Mecca, he studied under Shaykh Dr. Muhammad Alawi al-Maliki. In Morocco he studied under Sidi Mustafa Bassir and in Beirut, he studied under Shaykh Husayn Usayran, the last of the close students of Qadi Shaykh Yusuf al-Nabhani.

Haddad initially followed the Hanafi school of Sunni jurisprudence after his conversion to Islam but later adopted the Shafi'i school of Sunni jurisprudence. He stated he did so because: 1. He found it easier to study due to Shaykh Nuh Ha Mim Keller’s Reliance of the Traveler; 2. He found it more logical to practice because it is the main school of jurisprudence in Lebanon and because it is the school his wife follows and; 3. The founder of the school, Imam Shafi'i, was a member of the Quraysh tribe (the tribe of Muhammad) and Muhammad had told his followers to hold fast to the Quran and the members of his household.

== Life as an Islamic scholar ==
Shaykh Gibril Haddad is regarded as an accomplished and influential Islamic scholar, hadith expert (muhaddith), religious leader, author, and translator of classical Islamic texts. He holds ijazas from over 150 scholars across the Muslim world and has translated and published over 30 works.

In 2009, he was listed amongst The 500 Most Influential Muslims. He has been a teacher on the traditional online Qibla Islamic institute (formerly SunniPath) and is a contributor to the website eshaykh.com, which offers guidance and traditional teachings on various aspects of Islam. He is currently chief editor of the Integrated Encyclopedia of the Qurʾān (IEQ).

Opposition to Salafism

Haddad is a staunch defender of the traditional Islamic schools of law and an opponent of Salafism-Wahhabism. Jonathan A. C. Brown has noted Haddad to be an orthodox Sunni who has penned abrasive polemics against Salafism and mounted vigorous defense of traditional Islamic law.

He has published a complete translation of Qadi Ibn Jahbal al-Dimashqi's refutation of Ibn Taymiyya's Al-`Aqidat al-Hamawiyat al-Kubra ("The creed of the great people of Hama") as well as a primer on contemporary Salafism titled Albani and his Friends. He has criticized the Islamic Circle of North America (ICNA), the Islamic Society of North America (ISNA), and the World Assembly of Muslim Youth for promoting Salafism. He has also written a critique of Deobandi scholar Taqi Usmani's fatwa against the celebration of Muhammad's birthday (Mawlid).

== Works ==
Gibril Haddad has written hundreds of articles and written, translated and published many books including:

- Albani and His Friends: A Concise Guide to the “Salafi” Movement (2004)
- From the Two Holy Sanctuaries: A Hajj Journal (2006)
- The Four Imams and their Schools: Abu Hanifa, Malik, al-Shafi’i, Ahmad (2007)
- Sunna Notes: Studies in Hadith & Doctrine Volume I: Hadith History & Principles
- Sunna Notes: Studies in Hadith & Doctrine Volume II: The Excellent Innovation in the Qur’an and Hadith
- Ibn Khafif. Al-‘Aqida al-Sahiha (“Correct Islamic Doctrine”).
- Al-Bayhaqi. Al-Asma’ wal-Safat (“The Divine Names and Attributes”).
- Ibn ‘Abd al-Salam. Ai-Mulha fi I’tiqad Ahl al-Haqq (“Belief of the People of the Truth”).
- Ibn ‘Arabi. Aqidat al-‘Awamm min Ahl al-Islam (“Common Doctrine of the Muslim”).
- Sayyid Muhammad ‘Alawi al-Maliki. Al-Anbiya’ fi-Barzakh (“The Prophets in the Isthmus-Life”). Revised bilingual edition.
- Al-Anwar al-Bahiyya fi Isra’ waMi’raj Khayr al-Bariyya (“The Prophet’s Night Journey and Ascention”). Revised English edition.
- Sayyid Yusuf Hashim al-Rifa’i. Nasiha li-Ikhwaninia Ulama’ Najd (“Advice to our Brethren the Scholars of Najd”). Introduction by M.S.R. al-Buti. With Sayyid ‘Alawi Ahmad al-Haddad’s Misbah al-Anam (“The Light of Mankind”). English.
- Al-Habib ‘Ali al-Jafri. Jesus Christ the Son of Mary and His Most Blessed Mother
- Afdalu al-Khalqi Sayyiduna Muhammad (On the Prophetic Attribute “Best of Creation”). Bilingual.
- Al-Arba’un fi Fadli al-Shami wa-Ahlih wal-Hijrati ila Allahi wa-Rasulih (“The Excellence of Syro-Palestine and Its People in Emigrating to Allah and His Prophet: 40 Hadith”) Bilingual.
- Sayyiduna Abu Bakr al-Saddiq. Bilingual.
- Qubrus al-Tarab fi Suhbat Rajab (“The Joy of Cyprus in the Association of Rajab [1422]”). Discourses of Shaykh Nazim al-Haqqani. Bilingual.
- Mawlid: Celebrating the Birth of the Holy Prophet (peace be upon him)
- Collective Supplication: Sunna or Bid’a? Bilingual.
- Ahmad ibn Taymiyya
- ‘Ayn al-Hayb fi Usul Kashf al-Ghayb (“Proof-Texts of the Prophetic knowledge of the Unseen”). Bilingual.
- Siyar al-Khulafa’ al-Rashidin (“The Rightly-Guided Caliphs”). Bilingual.
- Usul al-Bid’at al Hasana fil-Qur'an wal Hadith (“Proof-Texts of the Good Innovation from the Qur’an and Hadith”). Bilingual.
- Al-Ziyarat al-Iraqiyya ila al-Hadarat al-Barzakhiyya bil-Imdadat al-Haqqaniyya wal-Suhbat al-Jiliyya (“Haqqani Visitation to the Sanctuaries of Iraq with Shaykh ‘Abd al-Qadir al-Jili al-Madani”). Bilingual.
- Min al-Haramayn al-Sharifayn (“From the Two Holy Sanctuaries: A Hajj Journal”). 2nd edition. Bilingual.
- Min al-Maghrib al-Mubarak (“From Blessed Morocco”). English and Arabic.
- Our Mother ‘A’isha al-Siddiqa al-Nabawiyya. Bilingual.
- The Ash’ari School and the Literalists: Texts and Biographies.
- The Lights of Revelation and the Secrets of Interpretation.
- Abd al-Khaliq. Hujjiyat al-Sunna (“The Binding Proof of the Sunna”). Bilingual.
- Ibn Jahbal al-Kilabi. The Refutation of Him [ibn Taymiyyah] Who Attributes Direction to Allah.
