= Ibn Qayyim al-Jawziyya =

Muslim scholar, jurist, and theologian (1292–1350)

Imam, Shaykh al-Islam Ibn Qayyim al-Jawziyya
- اِبْنُ قَيِّمِ الجَوْزِيَّةِ

Personal life
- Born: 29 January 1292 CE / 7 Saffar 691 AH Damascus, Mamluk Sultanate (present day Syria)
- Died: 15 September 1350 CE (aged 58) / 13 Rajab 751 AH Damascus, Mamluk Sultanate (present day Syria)
- Resting place: Bab al-Saghir Cemetery, Damascus, Syria
- Era: Islamic Golden Age
- Region: Sham
- Main interests: Jurisprudence; creed; hadith; asceticism
- Education: Al-Madrasa al-Jawziyya
- Occupation: Scholar; jurist; theologian; traditionist

Religious life
- Religion: Islam
- Denomination: Sunni
- Jurisprudence: Hanbali
- Creed: Athari

Muslim leader
- Influenced by: Sufyan al-Thawri; Ahmad ibn Hanbal; Uthman ibn Sa'id al-Darimi; Abu Isma'il al-Harawi; Ibn Qudama; Abd al-Ghani al-Maqdisi; Ibn Taymiyya
- Influenced: Ibn Kathir; Ibn Rajab; Ibn Abi al-Izz; Ibn Hajar al-Asqalani; Salafi movement
- Arabic name
- Personal (Ism): Muḥammad محمد
- Patronymic (Nasab): Ibn Abī Bakr ibn Ayyūb ibn Saʿd ٱبْن أَبِي بَكْر بْن أَيُّوب بْن سَعْد
- Teknonymic (Kunya): Abū ʿAbd Allāh أَبُو عَبْد ٱللَّٰه
- Epithet (Laqab): Ibn Qayyim al-Jawziyya; Ibn al-Qayyim; Shams al-Dīn ٱبْن قَيِّم ٱلْجَوْزِيَّة ٱبْن ٱلْقَيِّم شَمْس ٱلدِّين
- Toponymic (Nisba): Al-Dimashqī ٱلدِّمَشْقِيّ

Shams al-Dīn ʾAbū ʿAbd Allāh Muḥammad ibn ʾAbī Bakr ibn ʾAyyūb al-Zurʿī al-Dimashqī al-Ḥanbalī (29 Jan. 1292–15 Sep. 1350 CE / 691–751 AH), commonly known as Ibn Qayyim al-Jawziyya ("The son of the principal of [the school of] Jawziyyah") or Ibn al-Qayyim ("Son of the principal"; ابن القيّم) for short, or reverentially as al-Imam Ibn al-Qayyim in Sunni tradition, was an important medieval Syrian Arab Islamic jurist, theologian, and spiritual writer. Belonging to the Hanbali school of Fiqh (Islamic Jurisprudence), of which he is regarded as "one of the most important thinkers," Ibn al-Qayyim was also the foremost disciple and student of Ibn Taymiyya, with whom he was imprisoned in 1326 for dissenting against a established tradition during Ibn Taymiyya's famous incarceration in the Citadel of Damascus.

Of humble origin, Ibn al-Qayyim's father was the principal (qayyim) of the School of Jawziyyah, which also served as a court of law for the Hanbali judge of Damascus during the period. Ibn al-Qayyim went on to become a prolific scholar, producing a rich corpus of "doctrinal and literary" works. As a result, numerous important Muslim scholars of the Mamluk period were among Ibn al-Qayyim's students or, at least, greatly influenced by him, including, amongst others, the Shafi'i historian Ibn Kathir (d. 774/1373), the Hanbali hadith scholar Ibn Rajab (d. 795/1397) and Ibn Hajar al-Asqalani (d. 852/1449). In the present day, Ibn al-Qayyim's name has become a controversial one in certain quarters of the Islamic world due to his popularity amongst many adherents of Salafism, who see in his criticisms of such widespread Sufi practices of the medieval period associated with veneration of saints and the veneration of their graves and relics a classical precursor to their own perspective.

== Name ==
Muḥammad ibn ʾAbī Bakr ibn ʾAyyūb ibn Saʿd ibn Ḥarīz ibn Makkī Zayn ad-Dīn az-Zurʿī (Arabic: محمد بن أبي بكر بن أيوب بن سعد بن حريز بن مكي زين الدين الزُّرعي), al-Dimashqī (Arabic: الدمشقي), with kunya of ʾAbu ʿAbd Allah (Arabic: أبو عبد الله), called Shams ad-Dīn (Arabic: شمس الدين). He is usually known as Ibn Qayyim al-Jawziyyah, after his father Abu Bakr ibn Ayyub al-Zur'i, who was the superintendent (qayyim) of the Jawziyyah Madrasah, the Hanbali law college in Damascus.

== Biography ==
=== Teachers ===
While the main teacher Ibn al-Qayyim studied from was the scholar Ibn Taymiyya, he also studied under a number of other scholars including his father, Abu Bakr ibn Ayoub, Ibn 'Abd ad-Da'im, Shams ad-Dīn adh-Dhahabī, and Safi ad-Din al-Hindi. Ibn al-Qayyim began studying under Ibn Taymiyya at the age of 21 (1313-1328), after the latter moved back to Damascus from Cairo, and he stayed studying with him and being a close companion of his until Ibn Taymiyyah died in 1328 CE. As a result of this 16-year union, he shared many of his teacher's views on various issues, though his approach in dealing with other scholars has been seen as being less polemic.

=== Imprisonment ===
Ibn al-Qayyim was imprisoned with his teacher Ibn Taymiyya from 1326 until 1328, when Ibn Taymiyya died and Ibn al-Qayyim was released. According to the historian al-Maqrizi, two reasons led to his arrest: the first was a sermon Ibn al-Qayyim had delivered in Jerusalem in which he decried the visitation of graves, including Muhammad's grave in Medina, the second was his agreement with Ibn Taymiyyah's view on the matter of divorce, which contradicted the view of the majority of scholars in Damascus.

The campaign to have Ibn al-Qayyim imprisoned was led by Shafi'i and Maliki scholars, and was also joined by the Hanbali and Hanafi judges.

Whilst in prison, Ibn al-Qayyim busied himself with the Qur'an. According to Ibn Rajab, Ibn al-Qayyim made the most of his time of imprisonment: the immediate result of his delving into the Qur'an while in prison was a series of mystical experiences (described as dhawq, direct experience of the divine mysteries, and mawjud, ecstasy occasioned by direct encounter with the Divine Reality).

=== Spiritual life ===
Ibn Qayyim al-Jawziyyah wrote a lengthy spiritual commentary on a treatise written by the Hanbali Sufi Khwaja Abdullah Ansari entitled Madarij al-Salikin.

He expressed his love and appreciation for Ansari in this commentary with his statement "Certainly I love the Sheikh, but I love the truth more!'. Ibn Qayyim al-Jawziyyah refers to Ansari with the honorific title "Sheikh al-Islam" in his work Al-Wabil al-Sayyib min al-Kalim al-Tayyab.

=== Death ===
Ibn al-Qayyim died at the age of 60 years, 5 months, and 5 days, on the 13th night of Rajab, 751 AH (September 15, 1350 CE), and was buried besides his father at the Bab al-Saghīr Cemetery.

== Views ==
=== Jurisprudence ===
Like his teacher Ibn Taymiyya, Ibn Qayyim, supported broad powers for the state and prosecution. He argued, for example, "that it was often right to punish someone of lowly status" who alleged improper behavior by someone "more respectable."

Ibn Qayyim "formulated evidential theories" that made judges "less reliant than ever before on the oral testimony." One example was the establishment of a child's paternity by experts scrutinizing the faces of "a child and its alleged father for similarities". Another was in determining impotence. If a woman sought a divorce on the grounds of her husband's impotence and her husband contested the claim, a judge might obtain a sample of the husband's ejaculate. According to Ibn Qayyim "only genuine semen left a white residue when boiled".

In interrogating the accused, Ibn Qayyim believed that testimony could be beaten out of suspects if they were "disreputable". This was in contrast to the majority of Islamic jurists who had always acknowledged "that alleged sinners were entitled to remain silent if accused." Attorney and author Sadakat Kadri states that, "as a matter of straightforward history, torture had originally been forbidden by Islamic jurisprudence." Ibn Qayyim however, believed that "the Prophet Muhammad, the Rightly Guided Caliphs, and other Companions" would have supported his position.

=== Astrology and alchemy ===
Ibn Qayyim al-Jawziyyah opposed alchemy and divination of all varieties, but was particularly opposed to astrology, whose practitioners dared to "think they could know secrets locked within the mystery of God's supreme and all-embracing wisdom." In fact, those who believed that human personalities and events were influenced by heavenly bodies, were "the most ignorant of people, the most in error and the furthest from humanity ... the most ignorant of people concerning his soul and its creator".

In his Miftah Dar al-Sa'adah, in addition to denouncing the astrologers as worse than infidels, he uses empirical arguments to refute the practice of alchemy and astrology along with the theories associated with them, such as divination and the transmutation of metals, for example arguing:

And if you astrologers answer that it is precisely because of this distance and smallness that their influences are negligible, then why is it that you claim a great influence for the smallest heavenly body, Mercury? Why is it that you have given an influence to al-Ra's and al-Dhanab, which are two imaginary points [ascending and descending nodes]?"

=== Mysticism ===
Although Ibn al-Qayyim is sometimes characterized today as an unabashed enemy of Islamic mysticism, it is historically known that he actually had a “great interest in Sufism,” which arose out of his vast exposure to the practice given Sufism's widespread practice among Muslims at his time. Some of his major works, such as Madārij, Ṭarīq al-hijratayn (Path of the Two Migrations) and Miftāḥ dār al-saʿāda (Key to the Joyous Dwelling), "are devoted almost entirely to Sufi themes," yet allusions to such "themes are found in nearly all his writings," including in such influential works of spiritual devotion such as al-Wābil al-Ṣayyib, a highly important treatise detailing the importance of the practice of dhikr, and his revered magnum opus, Madārij al-sālikīn (The Wayfarers' Stages), which is an extended commentary on a work written by the eleventh-century Hanbalite saint and mystic Abdullah Ansari, whom Ibn al-Qayyim referred to reverentially as "Shaykh al-Islām." In all such writings, it is evident Ibn al-Qayyim wrote to address "those interested in Sufism in particular and ... 'the matters of the heart' ... in general," and proof of this lies in the fact that he states, in the introduction to his short book Patience and Gratitude, "This is a book to benefit kings and princes, the wealthy and the indigent, Sufis and religious scholars; (a book) to inspire the sedentary to set out, accompany the wayfarer on the Way (al-sā'ir fī l-ṭariq) and inform the one journeying towards the Goal." Some scholars have compared Ibn al-Qayyim's role to that of Ghazali two-hundred years prior, in that he tried "rediscover and restate the orthodox roots of Islam's interior dimension."

It is also true, however, that Ibn al-Qayyim did indeed share some of his teacher Ibn Taymiyya's more negative sentiments towards what he perceived to be excesses in mystical practice. For example, he felt that the pervasive and powerful influence the works of Ibn Arabi had begun to wield over the entire Sunni world was leading to errors in doctrine. As a result, he rejected Ibn Arabi's concept of wahdat al-wajud or the "oneness of being, " and opposed, moreover, some of the more extreme "forms of Sufism that had gained currency particularly in the new seat of Muslim power, Mamluk Egypt and Syria." That said, he never condemned Sufism outright, and his many works bear witness, as it has been noted above, to the immense reverence in which he held the vast majority of Sufi tradition. In this connection, it is also significant that Ibn al-Qayyim followed Ibn Taymiyyah in "consistently praising" the early spiritual master al-Junayd, one of the most famous saints in the Sufi tradition, as well as "other early spiritual masters of Baghdad who later became known as 'sober' Sufis." As a matter of fact, Ibn al-Qayyim did not condemn the ecstatic Sufis either, regarding their mystical outbursts as signs of spiritual "weakness" rather than heresy. Ibn al-Qayyim's highly nuanced position on this matter led to his composing apologies for the ecstatic outbursts of several early Sufis, just as many Sufis had done so before him.

== Reception ==
Ibn Qayyim was respected by a number of scholars during and after his life. Ibn Kathir stated that Ibn al-Qayyim,

was the most affectionate person. He was never envious of anyone, nor did he hurt anyone. He never disgraced anyone, nor did he hate anyone. ... I do not know in this world in our time someone who is more dedicated to acts of devotion

Ibn Rajab, one of Ibn Qayyim's students, stated that,

Although, he was by no means infallible, no one could compete with him in the understanding of the texts.

=== Criticism ===
Ibn Qayyim was criticized by several scholars, including:

- Taqi al-Din al-Subki (d. 756/1355) accused him of heresy, extreme anthropomorphism and unjust takfir of the Asharis in his poem al-Kafiya al-Shafiya fi al-Intisar lil-Firqa al-Najiya ( 'The Sufficient and Healing [Poem] on the Victory of the Saved Sect'). Hence Subki wrote a book against him, entitled: "Al-Sayf al-Saqil fi al-Radd ala Ibn Zafil".
- Ibn Hajar al-Haytami (d. 974/1566–7) in his al-Fatawa al-Hadithiyya declared Ibn al-Qayyim and his teacher Ibn Taymiyyah to be heretics. He described their position on the Divine attributes as anthropomorphist.

== Legacy ==
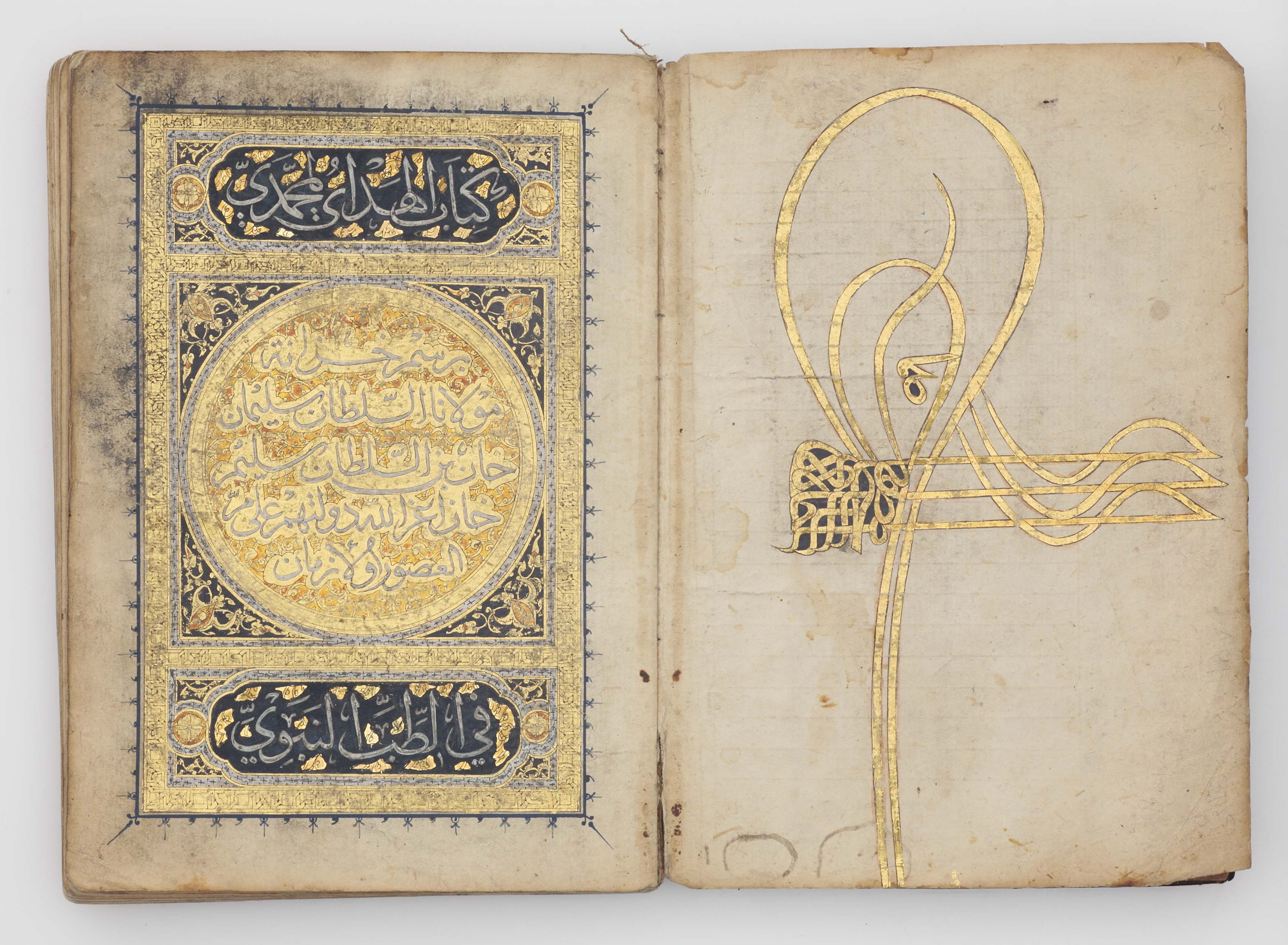
16th century manuscript of Al-Tibb al-Nabawi, a book on prophetic medicine

=== Works ===
Ibn Qayyim al-Jawziyyah's contributions to the Islamic library are extensive, and they particularly deal with the Qur'anic commentaries, understanding, and analysis of the prophetic traditions (Fiqh-us Sunnah). He "wrote about a hundred books", including:

- Zad al-Ma'ad (Provision of the hereafter)
- Turukul Hikmiyat fis Siasatush Sharia
- Al-Waabil Sayyib minal kalim tayyib – a commentary on a hadith about the Islamic prophet Yahya ibn Zakariyya.
- Aʿbād al-Masīḥ fī Naqd al-Naṣrāniyya (أعباد المسيح) – a polemical qasidah refuting Christian doctrines
- I'laam ul Muwaqqi'een 'an Rabb il 'Aalameen (Information for Those who Write on Behalf of the Lord of the Worlds)
- Tahthib Sunan Abi Da'ud
- Madaarij Saalikeen, which is an extensive commentary on the book by Shaikh Abu Ismail al-Ansari al-Harawi al-Sufi, Manazil-u Sa'ireen (Stations of the Seekers);
- Tafsir Mu'awwadhatain (Tafsir of Surah Falaq and Nas);
- Tafsir al-Ibn al-Qayyim (BADAA'I AT-TAFSIR).
- Badāʾiʿ al-Fawāʾid (بدائع الفوائد): Amazing Points of Benefit
- Ad-Dā'i wa Dawā also known as Al Jawābul kāfi liman sa'ala 'an Dawā'i Shaafi
- Haadi Arwah ila biladil Afrah
- Uddat as-Sabirin wa Dhakhiratu ash-Shakirin (عدة الصابرين وذخيرة الشاكرين)
- Ighathatu lahfaan min masaa'id ash-shaytan (إغاثة اللهفان من مصائد الشيطان) : Aid for the Yearning One in Resisting the Shayṭān
- Rawdhatul Muhibbīn
- Ahkām ahl al-dhimma
- Tuhfatul Mawdud bi Ahkam al-Mawlud: A Gift to the Loved One Regarding the Rulings of the Newborn
- Miftah Dar As-Sa'adah
- Jala al-afham fi fadhl salati ala khayral anam
- Al-Manar al-Munif
- Al-Tibb al-Nabawi – a book on Prophetic medicine, available in English as "The Prophetic Medicine", printed by Dar al-Fikr in Beirut (Lebanon), or as "Healing with the Medicine of the Prophet (sal allahu `alayhi wa salim)", printed by Darussalam Publications.
- Al-Furusiyyah
- Shifa al-Alil fi masa'il al qada'i wal qadri wal hikmati wa at-ta'leel (Remedy for Those who Question on Matters Concerning Divine Decree, Predestination, Wisdom and Causality)
- Mukhtasar al-Sawa'iq
- Hadi al-Arwah ila Bilad al-Arfah (Spurring Souls on to the Realms of Joy
- A treatise on Arab archery is by Ibn Qayyim al-Jawziyyah, Muḥammad ibn Abī Bakr (1292AD-1350AD) and comes from the 14th century.
