= Abu al-Hasan al-Ash'ari =

Muslim theologian (874–936)

Imam Abu al-Hasan al-Ash'ari
- أَبُو ٱلْحَسَن ٱلْأَشْعَرِيّ
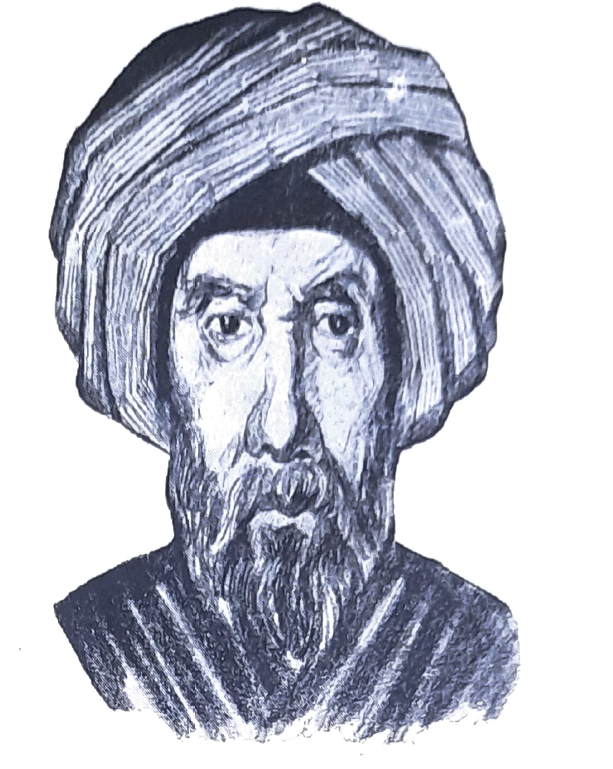
- A sketch representing Abu al-Hasan al-Ash'ari from a book entitled Sayr mulhimah: min al-Sharq wa-al-Gharb by unknown author, 1961
- Title: Shaykh al-Islam ('Shaykh of Islam'); Imam al-Mutakallimun ('Imam of the Scholastic Theologians'); Imam Ahl al-Sunna wa-l-Jama'a ('Imam of the People of the Prophetic Way and Community')

Personal life
- Born: 874 CE (260 AH) Basra, Abbasid Caliphate
- Died: 936 CE (324 AH; aged 62–63) Baghdad, Abbasid Caliphate
- Era: Islamic Golden Age (Abbasid era)
- Region: Abbasid Caliphate
- Main interests: Theology; Speculative theology
- Notable idea: Ash'arism
- Notable works: Risala Istihsan al-Khawd fi Ilm al-Kalam; Maqalat al-Islamiyyin wa-Ikhtilaf al-Musallin; Al-Luma; Al-Ibana

Religious life
- Religion: Islam
- Denomination: Sunni
- School: Shafi'i
- Creed: Independent (eponym of the Ash'ari school)

Muslim leader
- Influenced by: Al-Jubba'i; Ibn Kullab; al-Harith al-Muhasibi; Abu al-Abbas al-Qalanisi
- Influenced: All Ash'aris
- Arabic name
- Personal (Ism): ʿAlī عَلِيّ
- Patronymic (Nasab): Ibn Ismāʿīl ibn Isḥāq ٱبْن إِسْمَاعِيل بْن إِسْحَاق
- Teknonymic (Kunya): Abū al-Ḥasan أَبُو ٱلْحَسَن
- Toponymic (Nisba): Al-Ashʿarī ٱلْأَشْعَرِيّ

Abu al-Hasan al-Ash'ari (Note: Full name Abū al-Ḥasan ʿAlī ibn Ismāʿīl ibn Isḥāq al-Ashʿarī (Arabic: أَبُو ٱلْحَسَن عَلِيّ بْن إِسْمَاعِيل بْن إِسْحَاق ٱلْأَشْعَرِيّ)) (Arabic: أَبُو ٱلْحَسَن ٱلْأَشْعَرِيّ, romanized: Abū al-Ḥasan al-Ashʿarī; 874–936 CE) was an Arab Muslim theologian known for being the eponymous founder of the Ash'ari school of kalam in Sunnism.

Al-Ash'ari was notable for taking an intermediary position between the two diametrically opposed schools of Islamic theology prevalent at the time: Atharism and Mu'tazilism. He primarily opposed the Mu'tazili theologians on God's eternal attributes and Quranic createdness. On the other hand, the Hanbalis and traditionists were opposed to the use of philosophy or speculative theology, and condemned any theological debate altogether.

Al-Ash'ari established a middle way between the doctrines of the aforementioned schools, based both on theological rationalism (kalam) and the interpretation of the Quran and Sunna. His school eventually became the predominant school of theological thought within Sunni Islam. By contrast, Shia Muslims do not accept his theological beliefs, as his works also involved refuting Shia Islam.

== Biography ==
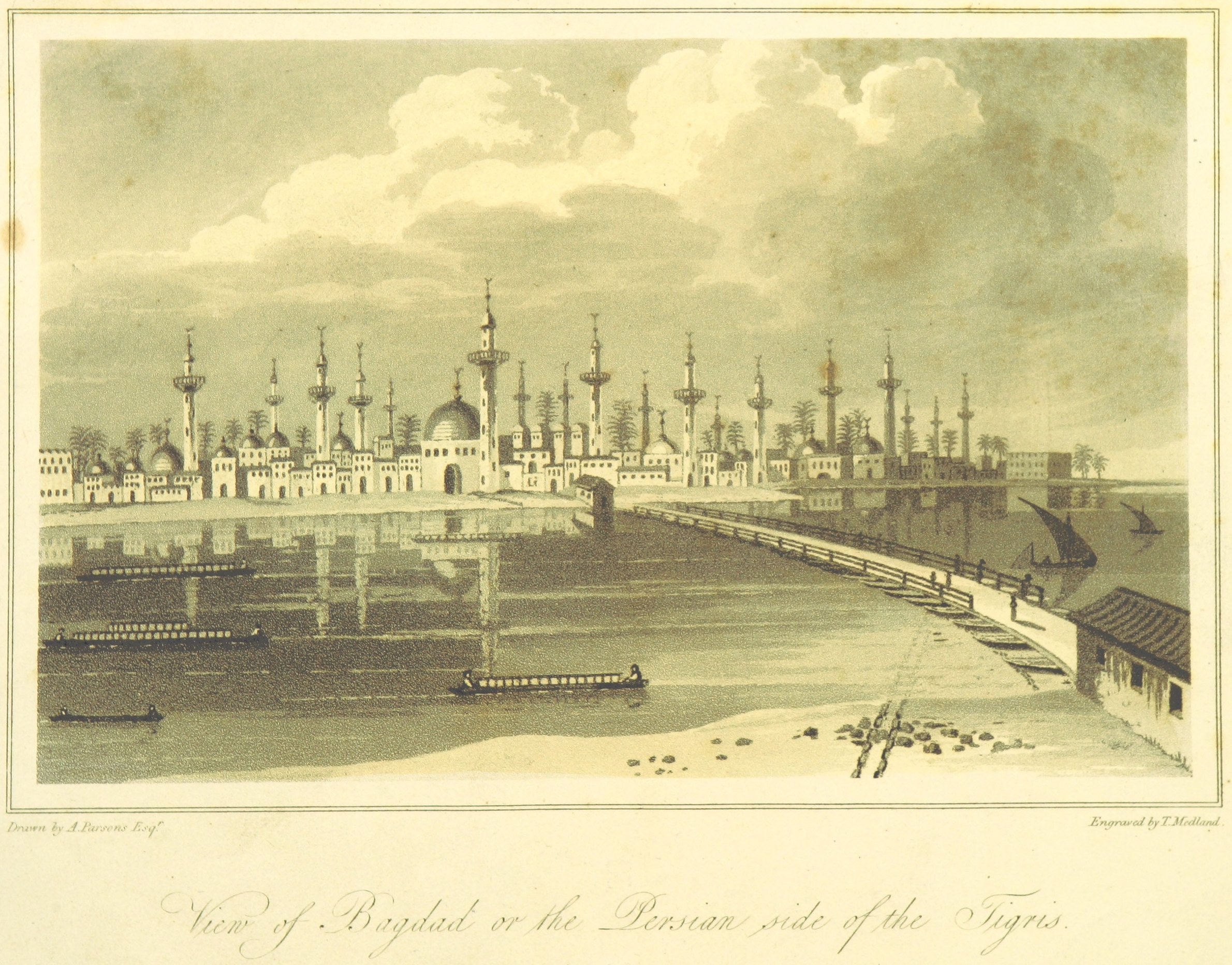
A depiction of Baghdad from 1808, taken from the print collection in Travels in Asia and Africa, etc. (ed. J. P. Berjew, British Library); al-Ashʿarī spent his entire life in the tenth-century in this city.

Abū al-Ḥasan al-Ashʿarī was born in Basra, Iraq, and was a descendant of Abū Mūsa al-Ashʿarī, who belonged to the first generation of Muhammad's closest companions (ṣaḥāba). As a young man he studied under al-Jubba'i, a renowned teacher of Muʿtazilite theology and philosophy.

According to the traditional account, al-Ashʿarī remained a Muʿtazilite theologian until his 40th year, when he allegedly saw the Islamic prophet Muhammad in his dreams three times during the month of Ramaḍān. The first time, Muhammad told him to support what was narrated from himself, that is, the prophetic traditions (ḥadīth). Al-Ashʿarī became worried, as he had numerous strong proofs contradictory to the prophetic traditions. After 10 days, he saw Muhammad again: Muhammad reiterated that he should support the ḥadīth. Subsequently, al-Ashʿarī forsook kalām (dialectical theology) and started following the ḥadīth alone. On the 27th night of Ramaḍān, he saw Muhammad for the last time. Muhammad told him that he had not commanded him to forsake kalām, but only to support the traditions narrated from himself. Thereupon, al-Ashʿarī started to advocate in favor of the authority of the ḥadīth reports, finding proofs for these that he said he had not read in any books.

After this experience, he left the Muʿtazilite school and became one of its most distinguished opponents, using the philosophical methods he had learned from them in order to refute their theological doctrine. Then, al-Ashʿarī spent the remaining years of his life engaged in developing his views and in composing polemics and arguments against his former Muʿtazilite colleagues. Al-Ashʿarī wrote more than 90 works during his lifetime, little of which have survived to the present day.

== Views ==
After leaving the Muʿtazila school, and joining the side of traditionalist theologians al-Ash'ari formulated the theology of Sunni Islam through Kalam and the usage of the Qur'an and Sunnah, following in the footsteps of Ibn Kullab and confirming the methods of other traditionalists such as Imam Ahmed ibn Hanbal a century earlier. He was followed in this by a large number of distinguished scholars of Sunni Islam, many of whom belonged to the Shafi'i school of law. The most famous of these are Abu al-Hasan al-Bahili, al-Baqillani, al-Juwayni, al-Nawawi, al-Ghazali and al-Razi. Thus Al-Ash'ari's school became, together with the Maturidi, the main schools reflecting the beliefs of the Sunnah. He is also known to have directly taught the Sufi Ibn Khafif.

In line with Sunni tradition (Ahl us-Sunnah wal Jama’ah), al-Ash'ari held the view that a Muslim should not be considered an unbeliever on account of a sin even if it were an enormity such as drinking wine or theft. This opposed the position held by the Khawarij.

Al-Ash'ari spent much of his works opposing the views of the Muʿtazila school. In particular, he rebutted them for believing that the Qur'an was created and that deeds are done by people of their own accord through their direct creation of them.

He was also noted for his teachings on atomism.

== Legacy ==
The 18th century Islamic scholar Shah Waliullah stated:

A Mujadid appears at the end of every century: The Mujadid of the first century was Imam of Ahlul Sunnah, Umar bin Abdul Aziz. The Mujadid of the second century was Imam of Ahlul Sunnah Muhammad Idrees Shaafi. The Mujadid of the third century was the Imam of Ahlul Sunnah, Abu al-Hasan al-Ash'ari. The Mujadid of the fourth century was Abu Abdullah Hakim Nishapuri.

Earlier major scholars also held positive views of al-Ash'ari and his efforts, among them Qadi Iyad and Taj al-Din al-Subki.

According to scholar Jonathan A.C. Brown, although "the Ash'ari school of theology is often called the Sunni 'orthodoxy,' "the original Ahl al-Hadith, early Sunni creed from which Ash'arism evolved has continued to thrive alongside it as a rival Sunni 'orthodoxy' as well." According to Brown this competing orthodoxy exists in the form of the "Hanbali über-Sunni orthodoxy".

== Works ==
The Ash'ari scholar Ibn Furak numbers Abu al-Hasan al-Ash'ari's works at 300, and the biographer Ibn Khallikan at 55; Ibn Asāker gives the titles of 93 of them, but only a handful of these works, in the fields of heresiography and theology, have survived. The five main ones are:

- Istihsan al-Khawd fi 'Ilm al-Kalam (Treatise on the Appropriateness of Inquiry in the Science of Kalam)
- Maqalat al-Islamiyyin (The Treatises/Teachings of the Muslims and the Differences of the Prayerful/Worshippers), an encyclopaedia of deviated Islamic sects. It comprises not only an account of the Islamic sects but also an examination of problems in kalām, or scholastic theology, and the Names and Attributes of Allah; the greater part of this works seems to have been completed before his conversion from the Muʿtaziltes.
- Al-Luma'
1. Al-Luma' fi al-Radd 'ala Ahl al-Zaygh wa al-Bida' (The Gleams/Illuminations on the Refutation of the People of Deviation/Perversity and Heresies), a slim volume.
2. Al-Luma' al-Kabir (The Major Book of Sparks), a preliminary to Idah al-Burhan and, together with the Luma' al-Saghir, the last work composed by al-Ash'ari according to Shaykh 'Isa al-Humyari.
3. Al-Luma' al-Saghir (The Minor Book of Sparks), a preliminary to al-Luma' al-Kabir.
- Al-Ibana 'an Usul al-Diyana (The Elucidation of the Fundamentals of Religion), though the authenticity of this book has been disputed by several scholars.
- Risala ila Ahl al-Thaghr

== See also ==
- Abi al-Hasan al-Ash'ari Center for Theological Studies and Research
- Abu Musa al-Ash'ari
- Ibn Kullab
- Al-Tahawi
- Abu Mansur al-Maturidi
- Abu al-Mu'in al-Nasafi
- List of Ash'aris and Maturidis
- List of Muslim theologians
- List of Muslim comparative religionists
- 2016 international conference on Sunni Islam in Grozny

== Early Islam scholars ==
Early Islamic scholars

Muhammad, The final Messenger of God (570–632) the Constitution of Medina, taught the Quran, and advised his companions
Abdullah ibn Masud (died 653) taught	Ali (607–661) fourth caliph taught	Aisha, Muhammad's wife and Abu Bakr's daughter taught	Abd Allah ibn Abbas (618–687) taught	Zayd ibn Thabit (610–660) taught	Umar (579–644) second caliph taught	Abu Hurairah (603–681) taught
Alqama ibn Qays (died 681) taught	Husayn ibn Ali (626–680) taught	Qasim ibn Muhammad ibn Abi Bakr (657–725) taught and raised by Aisha	Urwah ibn Zubayr (died 713) taught by Aisha, he then taught	Said ibn al-Musayyib (637–715) taught	Abdullah ibn Umar (614–693) taught	Abd Allah ibn al-Zubayr (624–692) taught by Aisha, he then taught
Ibrahim al-Nakha’i taught	Ali ibn Husayn Zayn al-Abidin (659–712) taught	Hisham ibn Urwah (667–772) taught	Ibn Shihab al-Zuhri (died 741) taught	Salim ibn Abd-Allah ibn Umar taught	Umar ibn Abdul Aziz (682–720) raised and taught by Abdullah ibn Umar
Hammad ibn Abi Sulayman taught	Muhammad al-Baqir (676–733) taught	Farwah bint al-Qasim Jafar's mother
Abu Hanifa (699–767) wrote Al Fiqh Al Akbar and Kitab Al-Athar, jurisprudence followed by Sunni, Sunni Sufi, Barelvi, Deobandi, Zaidiyyah and originally by the Fatimid and taught	Zayd ibn Ali (695–740)	Ja'far bin Muhammad Al-Baqir (702–765) Muhammad and Ali's great great grand son, jurisprudence followed by Shia, he taught	Malik ibn Anas (711–795) wrote Muwatta, jurisprudence from early Medina period now mostly followed by Maliki Sunnis in North Africa, and taught	Al-Waqidi (748–822) wrote history books like Kitab al-Tarikh wa al-Maghazi, student of Malik ibn Anas	Abu Muhammad Abdullah ibn Abdul Hakam (died 829) wrote biographies and history books, student of Malik ibn Anas
Abu Yusuf (729–798) wrote Usul al-fiqh	Muhammad al-Shaybani (749–805)	al-Shafi‘i (767–820) wrote Al-Risala, jurisprudence followed by Shafi'i Sunnis and Sufis, and taught	Ismail ibn Ibrahim	Ali ibn al-Madini (778–849) wrote The Book of Knowledge of the Companions	Ibn Hisham (died 833) wrote early history and As-Sirah an-Nabawiyyah, Muhammad's biography
Isma'il ibn Ja'far (719–775)	Musa al-Kadhim (745–799)	Ahmad ibn Hanbal (780–855) wrote Musnad Ahmad ibn Hanbal jurisprudence followed by Hanbali Sunnis and Sufis	Muhammad al-Bukhari (810–870) wrote Sahih al-Bukhari hadith books	Muslim ibn al-Hajjaj (815–875) wrote Sahih Muslim hadith books	Dawud al-Zahiri (815–883/4) founded the Zahiri school	Muhammad ibn Isa at-Tirmidhi (824–892) wrote Jami` at-Tirmidhi hadith books	Al-Baladhuri (died 892) wrote early history Futuh al-Buldan, Genealogies of the Nobles
Ibn Majah (824–887) wrote Sunan ibn Majah hadith book	Abu Dawood (817–889) wrote Sunan Abu Dawood Hadith Book
Muhammad ibn Ya'qub al-Kulayni (864- 941) wrote Kitab al-Kafi hadith book followed by Twelver Shia	Muhammad ibn Jarir al-Tabari (838–923) wrote History of the Prophets and Kings, Tafsir al-Tabari	Abu al-Hasan al-Ash'ari (874–936) wrote Maqālāt al-islāmīyīn, Kitāb al-luma, Kitāb al-ibāna 'an usūl al-diyāna
Ibn Babawayh (923–991) wrote Man La Yahduruhu al-Faqih jurisprudence followed by Twelver Shia	Sharif Razi (930–977) wrote Nahj al-Balagha followed by Twelver Shia	Nasir al-Din al-Tusi (1201–1274) wrote jurisprudence books followed by Ismaili and Twelver Shia	Al-Ghazali (1058–1111) wrote The Niche for Lights, The Incoherence of the Philosophers, The Alchemy of Happiness on Sufism	Rumi (1207–1273) wrote Masnavi, Diwan-e Shams-e Tabrizi on Sufism
Key: Some of Muhammad's Companions	Key: Taught in Medina	Key: Taught in Iraq	Key: Worked in Syria	Key: Travelled extensively collecting the sayings of Muhammad and compiled books of hadith	Key: Worked in Persia
