= Nuh Ha Mim Keller =

American Islamic scholar

- Title: Shaykh

Personal life
- Born: 1954 (age 71–72) United States
- Era: Modern era
- Region: Jordan
- Main interest(s): Sharia, Hadith, Tafsir, Sufism

Religious life
- Religion: Islam
- Denomination: Sunni
- Jurisprudence: Shafi'i
- Tariqa: Shadhili
- Creed: Ash'ari

Muslim leader
- Disciples: Asaduddin Owaisi
- Arabic name
- Personal (Ism): Nūḥ Ḥā Mīm نوح ح م
- Patronymic (Nasab): Keller كيلر
- Toponymic (Nisba): Al-Almānī الأَلْمَانِيّ Al-Wāshinṭunī الْوَاشِنْطُنِيّ

Nuh Ha Mim Keller (born 1954) is an American Islamic scholar, teacher and author who lives in Amman. He is a translator of a number of Islamic books.

== Life and scholarship ==
Keller was born in 1954 to a third-generation German American family in the State of Washington. In addition to his German roots, he possessed some Scottish and Irish ancestry on his mother's side as well. Keller studied philosophy and Arabic at the University of Chicago and the University of California, Los Angeles. He converted to Islam from Roman Catholicism in 1977. He has cited Islamic philosopher Seyyed Hossein Nasr's writings as one of the reasons for his conversion to Islam.

Keller worked as a commercial fisherman in the North Pacific. He then began a prolonged study of the Islamic sciences with prominent scholars in Syria and Jordan and was authorized as a shaykh in 1996. He joined the Shadhili Sufi order, becoming a disciple of the Sufi poet Sheikh ‘Abd al-Rahman al-Shaghouri of Damascus (from whom he received his authorization) from 1982 until his death in 2004.

His English translation of Umdat al-Salik, Reliance of the Traveller, (Sunna Books, 1991) is a Shafi'i manual of Shariah. It is the first Islamic legal work in a European language to receive the certification of Al-Azhar University.

Keller released a translation of the Quran titled The Quran Beheld in 2022 which strives to provide readers with a unique sense of the high eloquence and beauty of the Quran while also maintaining the linguistic and rhetorical accuracy. In the translator's own words, "Seven key areas of meaning" were "neglected by previous translations. Such gaps result in crucial elements of the Quran’s themes, logic, arguments, message, and meanings being lost. The Quran Beheld thus uncovers matters of Arabic meaning in the Quran for the first time in English."

Keller has also written numerous articles and was a regular contributor to Islamica Magazine and the website masud.co.uk.

Currently, Keller lives in Amman, Jordan, where he established a zawiya (seminary) in the early 2000s. At its height, the community attending the institution is believed to have amounted to around 60 families living permanently in Jordan, and hundreds of students of knowledge and families who visited the community for short visits seeking Keller's spiritual insights as well as formal Islamic studies with scholars in the area.

He is married to Besa Krasniqi, a scholar who is the daughter of Mazhar Krasniqi.

== Works ==
=== Author ===
- Evolution Theory and Islam: Letter to Suleman Ali, 1999.
- The Concept of Bidʻa in the Islamic Shariʻa, 1999.
- The Shadhili Tariqa: Notes from the Hashimi-Darqawi Order of the Tariqa of Imam Abul Hasan al-Shadhili, 1999.
- Port in a Storm: A Fiqh Solution to the Qibla of North America, 2001.
- Becoming Muslim, 2001.
- Sufism and Islam, 2002.
- Sea Without Shore: A Manual of the Sufi Path, 2011.

=== Translator ===
- Yaḥyā Ibn-Šaraf an-Nawawī, Al-Nawawi's Manual of Islam (Maqāṣid), 1996 (latest edition in 2009).
- Aḥmad Ibn-an-Naqīb al-Miṣrī, Reliance of the Traveller : A Classic Manual of Islamic Sacred Law (ʻUmdat al-salik), 1994 (latest edition in 2015).
- The Quran Beheld: An English Translation from the Arabic, 2022.
