= Abraham Parsons =

English commercial consul

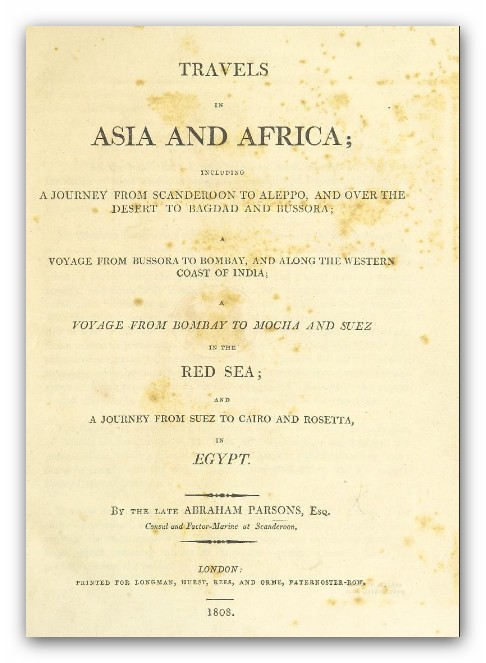
Title page of his book

Abraham Parsons (died 1785) was an English commercial consul and traveller. His account of his travels in the Middle East were published in 1808.

== Life ==
Abraham's father was a captain of merchant ships, and In early life he visited many countries in command of merchant vessels. He then set up in business as a merchant in Bristol in England, but was not successful. In 1767 the Turkey Company appointed him their consul and marine factor at Scanderoon (now İskenderun in Turkey), a post he held for six years, eventually resigning because of the unhealthiness of the climate.

He then began travelling for commercial purposes, making several journeys in Anatolia, and travelling from İskenderun, through the mountains to Aleppo, and crossing the desert from Aleppo to Baghdad. He travelled up the Euphrates to Babylon, and then downstream to Basra, where he was during the siege of Basra by a Persian army in 1775. He next visited Bombay, made a lengthy voyage along the whole west coast of India, visiting all parts as far as Goa. He returned by way of the Red Sea and Egypt, visiting Mocha, Suez, Cairo, and Rosetta. He got as far westward as Livorno, where he died in 1785.

== Publication ==
Parsons bequeathed a manuscript narrative of his travels to his brother-in-law, the Rev. John Berjew. In 1808 it was edited and published by his son, the Rev. John Paine Berjew of Bristol, entitled Travels in Asia and Africa. In the book, Parsons observantly describes towns and cities, taking interest in commerce, government and way of life.

A paper by Parsons, "A Phenomenon at Bussorah (March 1775)", describing a dust storm in Basra, appeared in Nicholson's Journal in 1808.
