= Daf' Shubah al-Tashbih =

Book by Abu'l-Faraj ibn al-Jawzi

Al-Baz al-Ashhab al-Munqadd 'ala Mukhalifi al-Madhhab
- Author: Abu'l-Faraj ibn al-Jawzi
- Language: Arabic
- Subject: Aqidah
- Pages: 108

Kitab Akhbar al-Sifat (Arabic: كتاب أخبار الصفات), better known as Daf' Shubah al-Tashbih bi-Akaff al-Tanzih (Arabic: دفع شبه التشبيه بأكف التنزيه), or Al-Baz al-Ashhab al-Munqadd 'ala Mukhalifi al-Madhhab (Arabic: الباز الأشهب المنقض على مخالفي المذهب, lit. 'The Gray Falcon Which Attacks the Offenders of the Hanbali School'), is a theological polemic written by Hanbali Islamic scholar Abu'l-Faraj ibn al-Jawzi between 1185 and 1192. The polemic is primarily directed at what, Ibn al-Jawzi held to be, growing anthropomorphic beliefs within the Hanbali school of jurisprudential thought. It singles out three prominent teachers within the Hanbali school: al-Hasan ibn Hamid, or Ibn Hamid al-Warraq (d. 1013), Muhammad ibn al-Husayn, or al-Qadi Abu Ya'la ibn al-Farra' (d.1066), and Ibn al-Jawzi's own teacher, Ali ibn Ubayd Allah, or Ibn al-Zaghuni (d. 1132), contending that they shirked from the beliefs of the school's founder, Ahmad ibn Hanbal.

== Anthropomorphism vs. Traditionalism ==
In the polemic, Ibn al-Jawzi distinguishes between anthropomorphic interpretation of ambiguous Qur'anic verses and hadith, and traditional interpretation. He writes in Kitab akhbar as-Sifat:

The imam Ahmad used to say "Let the texts of scripture stand as they are." Some of his leading disciples followed this principle ... However, three persons whom we have already mentioned viz. Ibn Hamid, the Qadi [Abu Ya'la], and Ibn az-Zaghuni are well known as advocates of a method of interpretation that takes sense experience as its point of departure.

He writes elsewhere in the polemic:

I say to my fellow Hanbalis: You are proponents of scripture and tradition ... Has anyone ever reported to you that Ahmad taught God's [istawa'] on the throne is one of the attributes of his essence or an attribute of action? On what grounds do you justify venturing into [a discussion] of such matters?

=== Ibn Jawzi's Ta'wil ===
While Ibn al-Jawzi advocated for a traditionalist and non-anthropomorphic approach to Qur'anic exegesis in Kitab akhbar as-Sifat, he did not object to interpretation outside the realm of "sense experience," interpreting 12 Qur'anic verses and 60 hadith in that manner. This included interpreting the Qur'anic phrase yadayan, which literally means "hands", to mean "favor or act of kindness" and interpreting the Qur'anic phrase saq, which literally means leg, to mean "power or ... might."

== God is neither inside nor outside of the Universe ==
Ibn al-Jawzi states, in as-Sifat, that God neither exists inside the world nor outside of it. To him, "being inside or outside are concomitant of things located in space" i.e. what is outside or inside must be in a place, and, according to him, this is not applicable to God. He writes:

Both [being in a place and outside a place] along with movement, rest, and other accidents are constitutive of bodies ... The divine essence does not admit of any created entity [e.g. place] within it or inhering in it.

== Conception of the Hanbali school of jurisprudential thought ==
=== Ahmad ibn Hanbal ===
The Hanbali scholar Ibn al-Jawzi states, in as-Sifat, that Ahmad ibn Hanbal would have been opposed to anthropomorphic interpretations of Qur'anic texts such as those of Ibn Hamid al-Warraq, al-Qadi Abu Ya'la and Ibn al-Zaghuni.

=== Ibn al-Zaghuni ===
Ibn al-Jawzi criticized Ibn az-Zaghuni for his statements regarding the Qur'anic istiwa'. He writes:

Ibn az-Zaghuni was asked whether a new attribute came into being upon the creation of the Throne, which had not existed previously, and he replied: "No, only the world was created with the attribute of being 'beneath' and so, in relation to [the Throne] which God occupies, the world is lower ... This man does not understand the implications of what he says, for when he ascribes to God ... a separation between the Creator and His creation, he imposes limits on Him and in effect, declares Him a body ... This shaykh does not comprehend what is necessarily entailed in God's status as Creator or what is incompatible with that status ...

== See also ==
- Asas al-Taqdis
- Al-Sayf al-Saqil fi al-Radd ala Ibn Zafil
