= The Moderation in Belief =

12th-century literary work by Al-Ghazali

Al-Iqtisād fī al-iʿtiqad
- Author: Al-Ghazālī
- Translator: Aladdin M. Yaqub
- Language: Arabic, English
- Subject: Islamic Theology
- Publication date: 12th century
- Publication place: Persia

Al-Iqtisād fī al-iʿtiqad (Arabic: الاقتصاد في الاعتقاد), or The Moderation in Belief is a major theological work by Abū Ḥāmid Muḥammad ibn Muḥammad al-Ghazali. George Hourani indicated that the Iqtisad and Mizan al-amal were completed before or during Ghazali's crisis of faith. It led him to leave his post at the Nizamiyya of Baghdad and enter the path of Tasawwuf. In it, he offers what scholars consider as the best defence of the Ash'arite school of Islamic theology. He also expressed strong reservations about a theology based on taqlid and marked by polemics. In this book, Ghazali makes an attempt to respond to the extreme literalists and the Muʿtazilites. It is the balance between reason and revelation that led to the title of book The Moderation in Belief.

== Contents ==
Ghazali begins the book with praise for God and importance of revelation. On one hand, he says, a person who is not guided by reason will misunderstand the revelation while on the other hand a rationalist may exceed the limits leading to rejection of the plain meaning of revelation. The right course, he says, is to reconcile reason with revelation, one that puts reason at the service of understanding and then interprets the revelation. Reason, together with the Revelation, is light upon light as mentioned in Quran chapter 24, verse 35. Next comes an explanatory chapter with its four introductions and four main sections. Ghazali's main topic throughout is in praise of God, depicting it as a work of theology.

== Translations ==
A translation into English of the first sections was published as a dissertation by Dennis Morgan Davis Jr. in 2005.

The first complete English-language edition was translated by Aladdin M. Yaqub, and published by the University of Chicago Press in 2013.
