= Ma'bad al-Juhani =

Founder of the Qadaris (died 699)

Ma'bad ibn Kalid al-Juhanī (Arabic: معبد الجهني; died 80 AH/ 699CE), was from the tribe of Juhaynah which lived and still live in around the city of Medinah in Arabia. He was Qadari, an idea he got from Sinbuya, and was declared as misguided by some of the companions of the Islamic prophet Muhammad, such as Abd Allah ibn Umar ibn al-Khattab. He was crucified by the orders of the Caliph Abd al-Malik in Damascus. According to a couple of sahih hadith, "The first person to speak about Al-Qadar" (the doctrine of predestination) or at least the first person in Basra to speak about it, was "Ma'bad Al-Juhani." (Note: According to a Jamiʽ al-Tirmidhi sahih hadith, "The first person to speak about Al-Qadar was Ma'bad Al-Juhani." Another sahih hadith states "It is narrated on the authority of Yahya b. Ya'mur that the first man who discussed qadr (Divine Decree) in Basra was Ma'bad al-Juhani.") His ideas were later followed by Abū Marwān Gaylān ibn Mūslīm ad-Dimashqī an-Nabati al-Qībtī.

== See also ==
- Qadariyyah
- Sinbuya Asvari
