= Predestination in Islam =

Concept of divine destiny in Islam

Qadar (Arabic: قدر, transliterated qadar, meaning literally "power", but translated variously as: "divine fore-ordainment", "predestination," "divine decree", "decree" of Allah", "preordainment") is the concept of divine destiny in Islam. As God is all-knowing and all-powerful, everything that has happened and will happen in the universe is already known. At the same time, human beings are responsible for their actions, and will be rewarded or punished accordingly on Judgement Day.

Predestination/Divine Destiny is one of Sunni Islam's six articles of faith, (along with belief in the Oneness of Allah, the Revealed Books, the Prophets of Islam, the Day of Resurrection and Angels). In Sunni discourse, those who assert free-will are called Qadariyya, while those who reject free-will are called Jabriyya.

Some early Islamic schools (Qadariyah and Muʿtazila) did not accept the doctrine of predestination; Muʿtazila argued that it was "unthinkable" that God "would punish man for what He himself had commanded". Predestination is not included in the Five Articles of Faith of Shi'i Islam. At least a few sources describe Shi'i Muslims as denying predestination, and at least one Shi'i scholar (Naser Makarem Shirazi) argues "belief in predestination is a denial of justice".

== Definition ==
In Islam, "predestination" is the usual English language rendering of a belief that Muslims call al-qaḍāʾ wa l-qadar ([ælqɑˈdˤɑːʔ wælˈqɑdɑr] القضاء والقدر). As per the Sunni understanding, the phrase means "the divine decree and the predestination"; al-qadr more closely means "(divine) power", deriving from the root ق د ر (q-d-r), which denotes concepts related to measuring out, aiming, calculating, preparing, being able, and having power. Another source states, that according to scholars:

- "the divine decree (al-qada’) consists of the entire and complete judgment forever",
- "the divine measurement (al-qadar) consists of the particulars of the judgment and its details".

Maria De Cillis also states the two words have "Semitic roots originating from Babylonian and Israelite religious traditions that considered the world" to be "a replica of what had already been recorded in celestial books or charts." (The name of the 97th surah of the Qur'an is known as Surat al-Qadr).

- Taqdeer (Arabic: تقدیر) also refers to predestination in Islam, the "absolute decree of the Divine", and comes from the same Q-D-R three consonant root, but is of a different "grammatical orders and thus not considered interchangeable" with Qadr. In Arabic it literally means ‘making a thing according to a measure’, or ‘occurrence of events according to pre-defined measures, standards or criteria’. It is found in verses Q.41:12, Q.36:38, Q.6:96.

== Scriptural basis ==
=== Quran ===
- "By no means can anything befall us [his creatures] but what God has destined for us" (Q.9:51)
- "He has ordained for you ˹believers˺ the Way which He decreed for Noah, and what We have revealed to you ˹O Prophet˺ and what We decreed for Abraham, Moses, and Jesus, ˹commanding:˺ 'Uphold the faith, and make no divisions in it.' What you call the polytheists to is unbearable for them. Allah chooses for Himself whoever He wills, and guides to Himself whoever turns ˹to Him˺."(Q.42:13)

... and in particular God's control over each humans destiny in the afterlife:

- "As for those who persist in disbelief, it is the same whether you warn them or not—they will never believe. Allah has sealed their hearts and their hearing, and their sight is covered. They will suffer a tremendous punishment." (Q.2:6-7)
- "If God had willed, He would have made you one community; but He leads astray whom He will, and guides whom He will; and will surely be questioned about the things you wrought." (Q.16:93)
- "Nor would thy Lord be the One to destroy communities for a single wrong-doing, if its members were likely to mend. If thy Lord had so willed, He could have made mankind one people: but they will not cease to dispute. Except those on whom thy Lord hath bestowed His Mercy: and for this did He create them: and the Word of thy Lord shall be fulfilled: 'I will fill Hell with jinns and men all together."(Q.11:119)
- "God misleads whom He will and whom He will He guides" (Q.14:4)
- "The Lord has created and balanced all things and has fixed their destinies and guided them." (Q.87:2)

"The Book of Decrees" (al-lawh al-mahfooz), is mentioned at least twice in the Quran.

- "Verily, We have created all things with Qadar (Divine Preordainments) of all things before their creation as written in the Book of Decrees." (Q.54:49)
- "No calamity befalls on the earth or in yourselves but is inscribed in the Book of Decrees before We bring it into existence. Verily, that is easy for Allah." (Q.57:22)

A reflection of belief in the power of divine will is found in the phrase Insha'Allah, Arabic for "if God willed [it]", which is frequently used by Muslims when referring to the future, to qualify any predictions of what will come to pass. The phrase obeys the verse:

- "Do not say of anything, I am doing that tomorrow, without [adding], If God wills" (Q.18:23)

Suggesting free will

Some verses seem to suggest that humans have free will:

- "As for Thamûd, We showed them guidance, but they preferred blindness over guidance. So the blast of a disgracing punishment overtook them for what they used to commit." (Q.41:17)
- "And say, ˹O Prophet,˺ '˹This is˺ the truth from your Lord. Whoever wills let them believe, and whoever wills let them disbelieve." (Q.18:28)
- "For each one there are successive angels before and behind, protecting them by Allah’s command. Indeed, Allah would never change a people’s state ˹of favour˺ until they change their own state ˹of faith˺. And if it is Allah’s Will to torment a people, it can never be averted, nor can they find a protector other than Him." (Q.13:11)
- "Whatever good befalls you is from Allah and whatever evil befalls you is from yourself. We have sent you ˹O Prophet˺ as a messenger to ˹all˺ people. And Allah is sufficient as a Witness." (Q.4:79)

=== Hadith ===
According to Alfred Guillaume, the "books of canonical traditions" do "not contain a single saying of Muhammad's which leaves freedom of action to man" (although he thinks "there are good reasons for believing that these traditions are forged at a time when the controversy was at its height ..."). One of the hadith where Muhammad tells Jibreel about the articles of faith, including "divine decree" is

- It was narrated from ’Umar that Jibreel عليه السلام said to the Prophet: What is faith (Iman)? He said: "To believe in Allah, His Angels, His Books, His Messengers, the Last Day and the divine decree, both good and bad." Jibreel said to him: You have spoken the truth. He said: We were amazed that he asked him and then confirmed his answers as being correct. The Prophet said: "That was Jībreel, who came to teach you your religion."

A hadith quotes Abd Allah ibn Umar ibn al-Khattab as narrating the hadith above along with the saying that:

- "If one of them were to spend gold the like of Uhud (mountain) in charity, it would not be accepted by Allah from him until he believes in Al-Qadar";

Another hadith encourages Muslims to "carry on doing good deeds", though it will not affect their place in the Afterlife, as they have already been assigned to either the Fire or in Paradise and that can't be changed:

- Ali narrated that one day the Messenger of Allah was sitting with a wooden stick in his hand with which he was scratching the ground. He raised his head and said, "There is none of you, but has his place assigned either in the Fire or in Paradise." They (the Companions) inquired, "O Allah's Messenger! Why should we carry on doing good deeds, shall we depend (upon Qadar) and give up work?" Muhammad said: "No, carry on doing good deeds, for everyone will find it easy (to do) such deeds that will lead him towards that for which he has been created." Then he recited the verse: "As for him who gives (in charity) and keeps his duty to Allah and fears Him, and believes in al-Husna, We will make smooth for him the path of Ease (goodness)" (Surah al-Lail 92:5-7).

== Qadar and free will ==
In orthodox Islam, God's control over what happens in his creation is absolute. "Allah has decreed all things from eternity". He knows that they will happen, when they will happen, how they will happen, and "He has written that and willed it". This includes "the pettiest of human or other, affairs", not withstanding "the grandeur of God's cosmic role", (in the words of scholar Michael Cook).

- "He knows what is in land and sea; not a leaf falls, but He known it." (Q.6:59)

But at the same time, human beings in their life on earth have the choice to do good or evil, are responsible for their actions, and will be rewarded or punished according in an eternal afterlife.

This poses the question, (raised by the early Islamic rationalist Muʿtazila school of thought), if everything that has happened and will happen, including all acts of good and evil, has already been determined by God, doesn't that mean that everything a human being does during their life is only following God's decree? How can human beings be responsible for this, and even punished with eternal torment in hell for it?

The question is not unique to Islam, and the debate over free will is not limited to religion. According to Justin Parrott of the Islamic Yaqeen Institute, "it has been an important issue throughout history", addressed by the ancient Greek philosopher Aristotle over 2000 years ago. Orientalist Alfred Guillaume points out the dilemma "has exercised the minds" of theologians of all religions "which claim to present" a god that is both almighty and moral.

Iranian Shia marja' Naser Makarem Shirazi gives an example:

They say, “Does God know that so and so at such and such an hour on such and such a day will kill someone or will drink an alcoholic beverage?” If we say, “He does not know,” we have denied God's knowledge. And if we say, “Yes, that person must do this, otherwise God's knowledge will be imperfect,” then, in order to preserve God's knowledge, a person is obliged to sin and obey God!

=== Controversy and danger ===
According to Maria De Cillis, "the apparently unsolvable conflict between the concepts of free will and determinism (or divine predetermination)" has not only been "a matter of great interest" but also of "heated controversy", extending beyond academia and the ulama and into politics "by virtue of the repercussions that this debate has in a social context"; (for example, when tyrannical and corrupt authorities encourage fatalism by pointing out that these maladies are "divinely willed and preordained"). According to Justin Parrott, "the idea ... that everything has already been decreed by the Creator from eternity— has troubled theologians and philosophers for centuries." And not only have members of those two professions taxed their brains about the conflict, but the "myriad of philosophical conundrums that arise" from the issue has caused some Muslims to experience doubts of faith. "Are we forced to do what we do, or are our choices meaningful?"

De Cillis writes that the issue was so sensitive, that the

Prophet allegedly taught believers to abstain from considerations about destiny (qadar), calling it a deep sea, a dark path and God's secret. One of the most authoritative Sunni intellectuals, the theologian and Sufi master, Abū Hāmid al-Ghazālī (d. 1111), reports in his masterpiece The Revival of the Religious Sciences, the tradition according to which Muhammad ... proclaimed: “Refrain from speaking about qadar.” (Note: Justin Parrott also quoted the Prophet's warning. “With this I have commanded you? With this I was sent to you? Verily, the people before you were destroyed when they argued over this matter. I am determined for you not to argue over it.” More recently, the Hanafi fiqh fatwa site IslamQA stated that predestination is one of those issues which God urges Muslims to "abstain from" speaking about "as much as possible". "We must believe in predestination, yet we cannot assume that our actions are entirely bound by it." Though "everyone's abode (for Jannat or Jahannam) has been written", because God "knows everything we have done", are currently doing, or will do in the future, nonetheless God has still "given us the choice in everything" we do.)

As a result, the scholars emphasized that providence is a secret of Allah and that "going too deeply into it philosophically" will lead to "misguidance". The creed of Al-Tahawi warns "that providence" (the seeming conflict of divine decree with human free will) is such a secret that even God's most obedient and holy creatures were not let in on the mystery.

The principle of providence is the secret of Allah Almighty in His creation that has not been given to an angel near Him, nor to a prophet or messenger. Exaggeration (al-ta’ammuq) and debate regarding it leads to failure, progressive denial, and a degree of transgression. Take every precaution against that kind of debate, thinking, and insinuation.

=== Popular descriptions ===
Incompatibility between predestination and free will is not an issue in many popular Islamic sources.

- "Allah knows everything and has already decided everything that will happen. ... The belief in free will is essential in Islam. This is because, for Muslims, life is a test from Allah. Therefore, all human beings must make their own decisions, and they will be judged on those decisions by Allah." (BBC);
- "Belief in al-qadar (the divine will and decree) is one of the pillars of faith, ... Allah has decreed all things from eternity and knows that they will happen at times that are known to Him, and in specific ways, and that He has written that and willed it, and they happen according to what He has decreed. ... The belief of Ahl al-Sunnah wa'l-Jamaa'ah [Sunni Islam] is that a person has freedom of will, and hence he will be rewarded or punished. But his will is subject to the will of Allah, and nothing can take place in the universe that is not willed by Allah. ... (IslamQA, a Salafi site);
- "God has foreknowledge of everything ... Even if the fate of man's soul is predetermined, he has no way of knowing what that fate is, and therefore it behooves him to strive for Allah's favor." (Thomas W. Lippman).

=== Explanations, justifications ===
The 10th century Ash'ari school of theology, (which is one of the main Sunni schools of Islamic theology), reconciles punishment in hell with the doctrine of total divine power over everything, with their own doctrine of kasb (acquisition). According to it, while any and all acts, including human acts of evil, are created by God, the human being who performs the act is responsible for it, because they have "acquired" the act. Humans only have the power to decide between the given possibilities God has created. Maria De Cillis explains it thusly:

In his attempt to illustrate the meaning of the verb “to acquire” (a word that is typical of Ash‘arite theology), [Ash‘arite theologian] al-Bāqillānī, in specifying the difference between a forced act and an acquired act, stated: “To acquire means that [man] freely performs his own acts by virtue of a [generated] power joined to such acts that makes them 'acquire' a qualification other than any compelled action. … Such qualification of the action is, precisely, what we name acquisition.” It was in relation to this specific state that the action led to reward or punishment. More specifically, although he did not credit human beings with the power to make the action good or wicked, al-Bāqillānī recognised that they had the capacity to act in such a way as to make their actions coincide with what God wanted or rejected, thereby conferring moral connotations upon actions. (Note: Malcolm Clark, (who taught in the Department of Religion at Butler University for 30 years), notes that "al-Ash'ari's 'solution' will seem more like a semantic trick to than a genuine solution" to non-Muslim Westerners today. "But before you criticize" this attempt to reconcile free will with divine determinism, "remember that no solution to this perennial problem" has been "able to resolve the problem to the satisfaction of non-believers". Encyclopedia.com also shares criticism of the reasoning of the Ashʿarīyah: "Other scholars, even Sunnī theologians like the Māturīdīyah, found the term kasb obscure and unsatisfactory and called the Ashʿarīyah "determinists" (mujbirah ).")

The scholars of inter-Islam.org explain that while Allah has "full knowledge of the individual's actions; past, present and future", this world is a test for humans to determine whether they go to paradise or hellfire. "The notion that this world is a test warrants that the subjects being tested possess free-will or else there would be no meaning to such a test." Since that test does have meaning, this proves the individual does have free-will.

Shia scholar Naser Makarem Shirazi response to those asking why God allows acts of evil that He, being all-knowing, knows will happen (see above), accusing them of asking the question in order to fabricate an excuse for committing sins. Shirazi maintains "our will or choice [are] also part of God's knowledge", and compares God to a teacher who "knows that a lazy student will fail at the end of the year and the teacher is one hundred percent sure of this fact because of years of experience as a teacher", and who cannot be held responsible for student's failure. (Note: Similarly, Inter-Islam.org a website of British mosques, offered the following example: "... An appointment is arranged between two individuals. The first arrives before time and waits for the second; he then comments that the second will arrive late as always. He bases his prediction on previous experience and the lax nature of the second individual. This statement does not restrict or bound the latter's ability to attend on time in any way, it is merely an assertion. Similarly, when Allah the Almighty informs us, through his infinite knowledge, of his knowledge of our precise actions and our consequent abode it should not be perceived to be a compelling decision against our free will, but rather only his knowledge of our decisions.")

Justin Parrott explains that "from a purely rational standpoint", it may seem impossible for God to have absolute knowledge and power over all action in the universe, and for humans to be responsible for their actions. Parrott quotes sahih hadith that our "life span, deeds, and ultimate fate" (whether we go to heaven or hell) are determined ("written by the angels") before we are born; yet after we are born we have the opportunity "to secure a good fate" by appealing "to Allah through worship, prayer, and good deeds". Parrott explains that while statements like these may seem "contradictory on their face" to us, that is only because "of the human mind's limited frame of reference". "We have to remember that Allah" and predestination "exists outside of time and space, beyond the cosmic veil in the Unseen," so that "we are simply incapable of conceiving it with our limited rational faculties".

Criticism

Skeptics have dismissed Qadar as unjust and non-sensical—inherently contradictory. Critic of Islam Ibn Warraq complains that the "system of predestination" turns men into "automata", undermining "the notion of moral responsibility" and the justification for the harsh punishment of hellfire.

== History ==
Based on what has been preserved of the poetry of pre-Islamic Arabs, it is thought that they believed that the date of the person's death (ajal), was predetermined "no matter what he or she did". A person's "provision" or "sustenance" (rizq), essentially food, was also pre-determined.

The concept of ajal is also found in the Quran in several verses, especially one revealed in reply to criticism of Muḥammad's military strategy (go out to Mount Uhud to fight when Muslims were attacked in Medina by the Meccans) that some Muslims complained led to unnecessary loss of life:

- "If you had been in your houses, those for whom killing was written down would have sallied out to the places of their falling" (Q.3:154).

(The verse expresses a different point of view—that acts are not predetermined, but their outcome is—than the later theological position that God knows/determines everything that happens.) The Qurʾān also speaks specifically of the supply of rizq, or provision being in God control:

- "He lavishes rizq on whom He wills, or stints it" (Q.30:37)

The question of how to reconcile God's absolute power with human responsibility for their actions, led to "one of the earliest sectarian schisms" in Islam, between the Qadarites (aka Qadariyah), who believed in total free will of humans (and who appeared in Damascus around the end of the seventh century CE); and the Jabarites, who believed in "absolute" divine "determinism and fatalism". One statement of the Qadarite school doctrine (Kitābu-l Milal wal Niḥal by Al Mahdi lidin Allah Ahmad b. Yaḥyā b. Al Murtaḍā (a.h. 764–840)) arguing against determinism stated:

- God knows that men will commit crimes, but his (fore) knowledge does not impel them so to do.
- God wills nothing but that which is good (p. 12) 3
- Everything happens by the decree and predestination of God except evil works (ألمعاصى "disobediences")

Ma'bad al-Juhani (d.699 CE), was crucified by the orders of the Caliph Abd al-Malik in Damascus. He was said to be the first man to discuss the Qadr (Divine Decree).

The Umayyad, during their reign, took the theological position that God had bestowed the caliphate on them, just as the Qurʾān described the bestowing of a caliphate on Adam (Q.2:30). Among their opponents were Qādarī who asserted "human free will in some form", such as that the good acts of any person come from God, but their bad acts (including those of God's caliph) come from themselves.

After the dispute between the Qadarites and Jabarites, Islam followed the middle path dictated by the Quran and Sunnah, "between the two extremes".

Following the overthrow of the Umayyad dynasty by the Abbasid in 750 CE, the Qādarī movement "either faded out or was absorbed into the rationalist Muʿtazila movement". The next two schools that felt the need to reconcile the idea of an omnipotent God (creating everything including human actions) with a just God (who does not hold human beings responsible for acts God, not they, willed), were the Muʿtazila and the Ashʿaris.

The Mu‘tazili school argued that since justice (‘adl) is "the true essence" of divinity, "God can only do and only wishes what is salutary for human beings". (Based on verses Q.3:104, Q.22:10, Q.4:81.) He not only orders people to do that which is good and forbids them to do that which is reprehensible, he abstains from doing evil Himself. The evil in the world comes instead from Man's/human beings' free will. Man (the human race), therefore, is "the genuine “creator” (khāliq) of his actions".

The Ash‘ari school, named after for Abū al-Hasan al-Ash‘arī (d. 935), argued that since God is all-powerful, "he is the sole, true author of every action, good or bad", including, of course, human actions. Humans are "limited to taking possession (by way of acquisition – kasb) of the actions created for him by God". Having acquired these actions they are responsible for them on Judgement Day. Sunni Islam supported the Ash‘ari school (though not exclusively) and opposed the Mu‘tazili.

Exponents of Islamic modernism, such as Muḥammad ʿAbduh (d. 1905), and Fazlur Rahman (d. 1988), follow the standard doctrine that God "has foreknowledge of human actions", but the fact that the future has been determined and includes evil acts, "does not compel humans to commit sin".

Cedomir Nestorovic asserts that the limited acceptance of free-will might have influence on the Islamic market place. The belief in free-will might motivate an individual to change the order of things. If there is a lack of belief in free-will, it is unlikely for a company to make changes.

== Sunni view ==
Sunnis enumerate Qadar as one aspect of their creed (Arabic: aqidah). They believe that the divine destiny is when God wrote down in the Preserved Tablet (al-Lawhu 'l-Mahfuz) all that has happened and will happen, which will come to pass as written.

According to Maturidi belief, all active possibilities are created by God and humans act in accordance with their free intention to choose which action they follow. In this way, the intention precedes the created action and capacity by which actions are acquired (kasb in Arabic).

=== Belief in al-Qadar is based on four things ===
According to two conservative sources (islamqa.info and Allah Knowing) belief in al-Qadar is based on four things, components aspects:

1. – العلم Al-ʿIlm – Knowledge: i.e., that Allah knows what had been, what will be, what has never been, and how it could be if it was; also what Allah says. He also knows what His creation will do, by virtue of His eternal knowledge, including their choices that will take place.
2. – كتابة Kitabah – Writing: i.e., that Allah has written every thing that exists including the destiny of all creatures in al-Lawhu 'l-Mahfuz prior to creation. Also called Allah's "pre-recording".
3. – مشيئة Mashii'ah – Will: i.e., that what Allah wills happens and what He does not will not happen. There is no movement in the heavens or on earth but happens by His will. This does not mean that He forces things to happen the way they happen in the area of human beings' voluntary actions. It means that He knew what they will choose, wrote it and now lets it happen.
4. – الخلق Al-Khalq – Creation and formation: i.e., that Allah is the Creator of all things, including the actions of His servants. They do their actions in a real sense, and Allah is the Creator of them and of their actions.

=== Stages of Taqdeer (fate) ===
There are five stages where Qadar is determined and prescribed/sent to creation:

1. The Decree of Allah that is written in Al-Lawh Al-Mahfuud before the creation of the universe. This destiny, written in the preserved tablet, is never changed and encompasses everything that will be.
2. Allah made a divine decree after the creation of Adam. Allah took out all of the progeny of Adam (i.e. all of the humans from the beginning of time until the end of time), and asked them "Am I not your Lord?" and all of the humans responded "We testify that You are our Lord!" Then Allah decreed to them who shall go to paradise and who shall go to hell.
3. The Life-time decree. This occurs when people are in the womb of their mothers, specifically 120 days after conception. Allah sends an angel to put a soul into the body, and the angel writes down the decree that Allah has made; their life-spans, their actions, their sustenances (how much they will earn throughout their lifetime) and whether they will be dwellers of paradise or a dweller of hell.
4. The yearly decree. This is during the Night of Qadr (Night of Decree) where Allah sends down his decrees from heaven to earth, in it he destines the actions (deeds, sustenance, births, deaths, etc.) of creation for the next year. The word Qadar should not be confused with Qadr; Qadar is destiny, Qadr is that which has been destined, i.e. decree, thus the translation – Night of Decree.
5. The Daily Decree. Allah decrees the daily actions of his creation.

An example of how these categorizations help clear the idea of destiny is as follows: It is possible that Allah sends a daily/yearly decree dictating that a person will make a profit. However, due to that person's good deeds (for instance, fulfilling the ties of kinship [being good to your relatives and maintaining the relationship]), Allah sends another decree increasing that person's profit. The reversal of the two decrees is all within Allah's knowledge and is recorded in the Preserved Tablet. The person himself knows nothing of his own destiny or of Allah's decrees, but what he does know is that if he performs certain good deeds, then He will increase his profit (as in the example above) more than if he does not do that deed.

== Shi'a view ==
Shi'i Twelvers, along with other Shia sects, such as the Zaydis, reject predestination. This belief is further emphasized by the Shia concept of Bada', which states that God has not set a definite course for human history. Instead, God may alter the course of human history as God sees fit.

However, according to Encyclopedia.com (drawing from W. Montgomery Watt and Asma Afsaruddin), contemporary Imāmīs, aka Twelver Shi'a, "in general, subscribe to the doctrine of divine determination with a nod in the direction of free will; Ismāʿīlī views are not dissimilar. The Zaydī Shīʿī are closer to the Muʿtazilah in their views".

Some positions taken by leading Shi'i scholars (quotes from Maria De Cillis) include:

- “Neither absolute compulsion, nor absolute delegation but something in between”, (lā jabr wa-lā tafwīd wa lākin amr bayn amrayn). Attributed to The sixth imam of Twelver Shi'i, Ja‘far al-Sādiq (d. 765).
- "human actions are created by God and can "simultaneously" be classified as free actions" and divinely "obligatory actions".
  - Free unless someone had forced the person to do them, and obligatory because they "proceeded from a cause produced by God". Hisham ibn al-Hakam, a companion of Ja‘far al-Sādiq and also a scholar.
  - This position was adopted by the Qom's theological school and the Shi'i hadith scholar al-Kulaynī (d. 941),
- God can not "be deemed either the creator of actions or the One wishing wicked human actions". Sheikh al-Mufīd (d. 1022), member of Baghdad's Imamite school.

The idea of "a tablet" with the future written on it is not unique to Sunni Islam as one Twelver Shi'i scholar (Al-Shaykh Al-Mufid d.1022), claiming that "the Tablet is the Book of Almighty Allah in which He has written all that will be till the Day of Resurrection".

To show that there is no contradiction between being predestined, and free will, Shiites state that matters relating to human destiny are of two kinds: definite and indefinite. To explain the definitive one, Shiites argue that God has definite power over the whole of existence, however, so whenever He wills, He can replace a given destiny with another one; and that is what is called indefinite destiny. Some of these changes of destiny, thus, are brought about by man himself, who can through his free will, his decisions, and his way of life lay the groundwork for a change in his destiny as has been pointed out in the verse:

- Truly, God will not change the condition of a people as long as they do not change Their state themselves. (Q.13:11)

Both types of destinies, however, are contained within God's foreknowledge, Shiites argue, so that there could be no sort of change (badaʾ lit. "mutability") concerning His knowledge. So the first type of destiny does not mean a limitation of God's power; since God, in contrast to the belief of Jews who said the hand of God is tied’ asserts: Nay, His hands are spread out wide .... So God has the power to change everything he wills and God's creativity is continuous. Accordingly, as Sobhani puts it, "all groups in Islam regard "bada" as a tenet of the faith, even if not all actually use the term."

Iranian scholar Naser Makarem Shirazi asserts that "belief in predestination is a denial of justice", and that there is free will in Islam, but at the same time (according to him) God has foreknowledge of everything in the future. He tackles the paradox of God knowing man will commit a certain sin, and man's free will to commit it by postulating the existence of a machine so advanced that it can predict the occurrence of an event some hours in advance. Yet one would not say the machine compelled that event to occur; likewise, God's perfect knowledge doesn't compel man to commit sins.

=== Ismaili ===
Ismaili thinkers such as Abū Hātim al-Rāzī (d. 934), Muhammad Ibn Ahmad al-Nasafī (d. 942), Abū Ya‘qūb Ishāq Ibn Ahmad al-Sijistānī (d. around 971), the Fatimid jurist al-Qādī al-Nu‘mān (d. 974) and the missionary” (dā‘ī) Hamīd al-Dīn al-Kirmānī (d. around 1021–22), "all contributed" to defining the terms qadā’ and qadar used in the Quran. Ismaili thinkers wrote that humans were not able to fully grasp the Qur’anic truths in their exoteric and esoteric essence. Human knowledge, therefore required "guidance of a hierarchy of divinely designated masters", including "the whole chain of Ismaili religious dignitaries and officials."

== See also ==
- Qadariyah
- Al-Qadr (surah)
- Laylat al-Qadr
- Will of God
