= Sinbuya Asvari =

Abu Yunis Sinbuya Asvāri (Persian: سنبویه اسواری) was the originator of the idea of Qadariyah, the doctrine of free-will in Islam. He was a Persian who was put to death by the Umayyad caliph Abd al-Malik, or, according to other narratives, by al-Hajjaj bin Yusuf. His idea was already taught in Damascus at the end of the seventh century of our era by Ma'bad al-Juhani (died in A.D. 699), who had imbibed the doctrine from Sinbuya.

Sinbuya was one of the 'Asvaran' (the Sassanian Elite cavalry), stationed in Basrah. His name is also attested as 'Sinsuyah'. Sinbuyah was married to 'Umm Musa'.

== See also ==
- Qadariyya
- Ma'bad al-Juhani
