= Qadariyah =

Early school of Islamic theology

Qadariyyah (Arabic: قَدَرِيَّة, romanized: Qadariyya), also Qadarites or Kadarites, from qadar (قدر), meaning "power", was originally a derogatory term designating early Islamic theologians who rejected the concept of predestination in Islam, qadr, and asserted that humans possess absolute free will, making them responsible for their actions, justifying divine punishment and absolving God of responsibility for evil in the world. Originally, the Qadarites also reject belief in the prior knowledge of God, and they deny that God wrote the decrees concerning His creation before He created the heavens and the earth; Consequently, their belief goes against the teachings of Sunni Islam. Some of their doctrines were later adopted by the Mu'tazilis and rejected by the Ash'aris. They argued that evil actions of human beings could not be decreed by God, as they would have to be if there was no free will and all events in the universe were determined by God.

Qadariyyah was one of the first philosophical schools in Islam. The earliest document associated with the movement is the pseudoepigraphical text Risala attributed to Hasan al-Basri, which was composed between 75 AH/694 CE and 80/699, though debates about free will in Islam probably predate this text. According to Sunni sources, the Qadariyah were censured by Muhammad himself by being compared to Zoroastrians, who likewise deny predestination.

== Sources ==
The medieval sources upon which information about the Qadariya is based include Risālat al-qadar ilā ʿAbd al-Malik (Epistle to ʿAbd al-Malik against the Predestinarians) which is incorrectly ascribed to Hasan al-Basri; anti-Qadari letters by Hasan ibn Muhammad ibn al-Hanafiyyah and Caliph Umar II; the work of the 9th-century Islamic scholar Khushaysh; the list of Qadarites by Ibn Qutayba, Ibn Hajar, al-Suyuti, Ibn al-Murtada and al-Dhahabi; scattered references to the Qadariya in the work of al-Tabari; and counter-Qadari polemics in the standard hadith collections of Sahih Muslim.

In Sunan Abu Dawood, it is narrated Abdullah ibn Umar that the Prophet said,

"The Qadariyyah are the Magians of this community. If they are ill, do not pay a sick visit to them, and if they die, do not attend their funerals."

Another report states

"To every Ummah there is a magian and the magian of this ummah are those who reject the Qadr. If anyone amongst them dies, do not attend their funeral, and if anyone amongst them becomes sick don’t visit them and they are Shiat ad-Dajjal and it is the right of God to join them with the Dajjal.” (Sunan Abi Dawud 4692)

In another Hadith attributed to Prophet Muhammad in Sunan Ibn Majah the Qadariyah along with the Murji'ah are excommunicated from Islam, “'There are two types of people among this Ummah who have no share of Islam: The Murji'ah and the Qadariyyah.'" Regarding the Qadarites who denied the prior knowledge of Allah, more or less they have disappeared.

“Qurtubi said: this school of thought no longer exists, and we know of no one in later times who belongs to it. Haafiz ibn Hajar al ‘Asqalaani said: the Qadariyah nowadays are unanimously agreed that Allah knows about the deeds of His slaves before they happen, but they differ from the Salaf (the Pious Predecessors) in their claim that people’s deeds are done by them and stem from them independently of Allah. Although this is a false opinion, it is less serious than the former view. In later times, some of them denied that the Will of Allah has anything to do with the deeds of man, in an attempt to avoid connecting the Eternal with the created.”

Hanafi jurist Abu Ja'far al-Tahawi described the Qadariya as group who denies (negates) God's will for the actions of the mortals and believe the will for the mortals are absolute.

== See also ==
- Mu'tazili
- Ma'bad al-Juhani
- Jabariyah, a contrasting Islamic school of thought

== Bibliography ==
- Islamic Philosophy A-Z, Peter S. Groff and Oliver Leaman. Edinburgh: Edinburgh University Press, 2007. ISBN 0-7486-2089-3.
- An Introduction to Islam, David Waines, Cambridge, New York: Cambridge University Press, 2003. ISBN 0-521-53906-4.
- Van Ess, J. (1978). "Ḳadariyya". In van Donzel, E.; Lewis, B.; Pellat, Ch. & Bosworth, C. E. (eds.). The Encyclopaedia of Islam, Second Edition. Volume IV: Iran–Kha. Leiden: E. J. Brill. pp. 368–372. ISBN 978-90-04-05745-6. OCLC 758278456.
