= Bayan ibn Sam'an al-Tamimi =

8th-century claimant of Islamic prophethood

Bayān ibn Samʿān
- بيان بن سمعان
- Died: c. 737 CE; Kufa, Umayyad Empire

Philosophical work
- Era: Umayyad
- School: Ghulat
- Main interests: Claiming prophethood
- Notable ideas: Bayaniyya sect, Quranic createdness

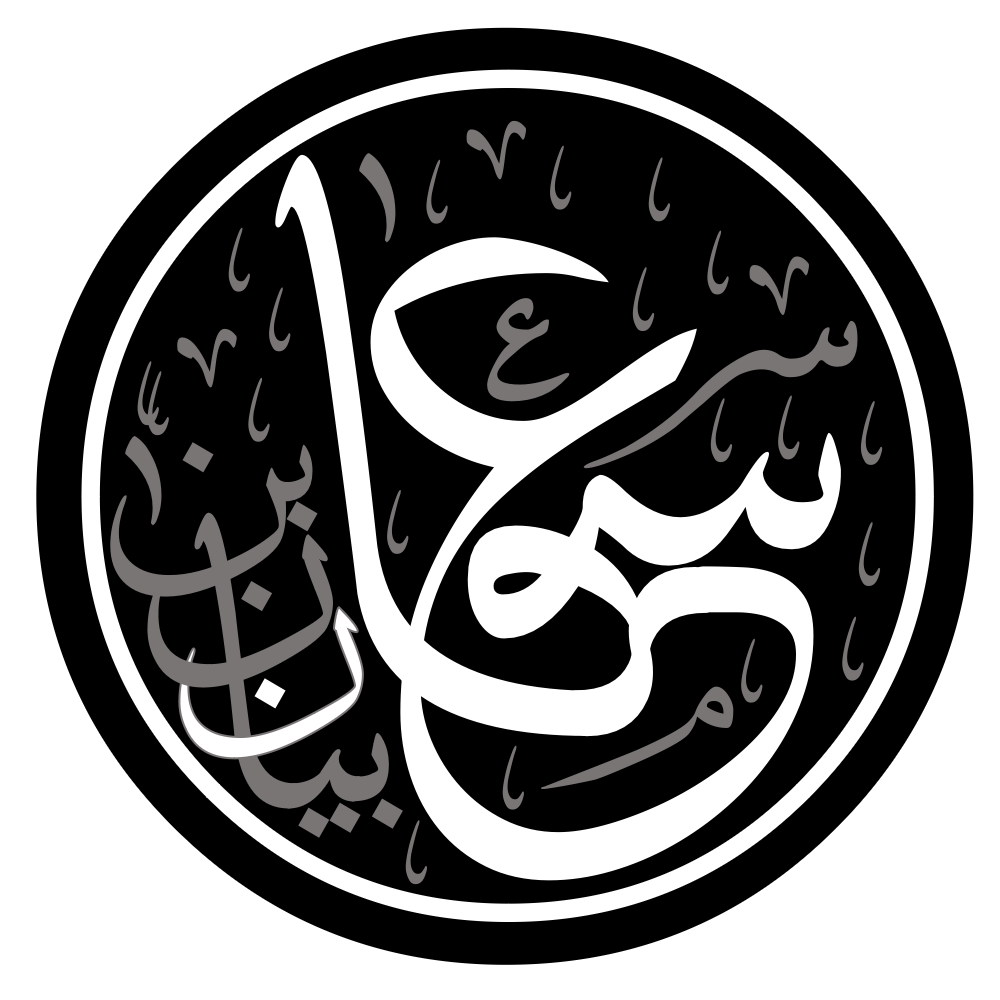

Bayān ibn Samʿān at-Tamīmī an-Nāhdī (Arabic: بيان بن سمعان التميمي النهدي) was the founder of the 8th-century Bayaniyya sect of Shi'a Islam, as well as a claimant to prophethood. He was also the first to spread the idea of Quranic createdness.

== Teachings ==
According to the Shi'ite theologian Abu Muhammad al-Hasan ibn Musa al-Nawbakhti, Bayan ibn Sam'an was a Shi'ite of the Ghulat who supported Abu Hashim as a rightful caliph, but later claimed prophethood after Abu Hashim died. Bayan ibn Sam'an was also a supporter of the idea of Quranic createdness and was considered as one of the first people to have propagated the idea widely. These theological virtues regarding the Qur'an served as the basis for the theology of al-Ja'd ibn Dirham and later Jahm ibn Safwan of the Jahmi group.

Bayan ibn Sam'an is considered to have been the founder of the 8th-century Bayaniyya sect of Ghulat Shi'ism, which is now counted amongst the extinct Shi'a sects.

== Death ==
Bayan ibn Sam'an was executed for his beliefs, which the majority of the Muslim scholars considered to be heretical at the time. His execution was performed by the governor of Iraq, Khalid al-Qasri at Kufa in the year 737. It is narrated in Bihar al-Anwar that Bayan ibn Sam'an was set on fire, resulting in him being burnt to death.

== See also ==
- Ghulat
- List of extinct Shi'a sects
