= Bishr al-Marisi =

9th century scholar and theologian

Bishr ibn Ghiyath al-Marisi

Personal life
- Born: 755 CE
- Died: 833 CE
- Region: Mesopotamia (present-day Iraq)
- Main interest: Philosophy
- Notable idea(s): Creation of the Qur'an, Metaphorical Interpretations of God's Attributes
- Occupation: Scholar and theologian

Religious life
- Religion: Islam
- Denomination: Murji'ah, Jahmiyyah
- Jurisprudence: Hanafi

Muslim leader
- Influenced by: Jahm bin Safwan, Abu Hanifa, Abu Yusuf

Bishr al-Marisi (Arabic: بشر المريسي born 755, died 833) full name Abu 'Abd al-Rahman Bishr ibn Ghiyath ibn Abi Karimah al-Marisi or simply Bishr ibn Ghiyath al-Marisi was a 9th-century religious scholar and theologian. He was infamous for his controversial views which earned him the scorn of his contemporary Muslim scholars.

== Biography ==
=== Early life ===
Bishr's father, Ghiyath, was a Jewish slave or jeweller from Kufa who had reverted to Islam and become a mawla of the Quraysh tribe.

=== Pursuit of knowledge and asceticism ===
In adulthood, Bishr became an ascetic, and he took scholarly knowledge from Hanafi scholars, such as Abu Yusuf. However, he later adopted the Jahmite views after he learned them from a group of Jahm bin Safwan's students. Abu Yusuf disassociated with Bishr after finding out that he had Jahmite or Murji'ite tendencies.

Bishr also conducted theological debates with Al-Shafi'i, and in his free time he made offensive melodies and poetry.

=== Death ===
Bishr al-Marisi died in the year 833. According to Al-Khatib al-Baghdadi, the people of Baghdad (whom were influenced by Bishr's opponents) rejoiced upon hearing news of his death.

== Criticism ==
Bishr al-Marisi was criticized and subsequently excommunicated by many scholars who lived contemporary to him, and after him. The Shafi'ite jurist Uthman ibn Sa'id al-Darimi wrote a book titled Naqd 'Uthman ibn Sa'id 'alal-Marisi al-Jahmi al-Anid, which was a detailed refutation of Bishr and his theology. The Hanafite jurist Abd al-Aziz al-Kinani published a treatise titled Kitab al-Haydah, which served a similar purpose. Some other scholars had murderous desires against him and attempted to incite violence against him. One such example was Yazid ibn Harun, whom encouraged his neighbours to assault and kill Bishr.

The Tabi' al-Tabi'een members, Sufyan ibn Uyaynah and Abd Allah ibn al-Mubarak excommunicated Bishr al-Marisi. Even Sufis like Bishr Hafi did the same, and were harsh against Bishr's opinions especially his views on the createdness of the Qur'an and God's divine attributes. Abu Bakr al-Khallal also forbade people from praying behind Bishr al-Marisi.

=== Praise ===
Despite the harsh criticisms from many scholars, Bishr al-Marisi was praised by the historian Al-Dhahabi, who regarded him as a brilliant speaker and debater. Ibn al-Nadim regarded Bishr as a great ascetic who wrote books in refutation of the Kharijites and Shi'ites.

== See also ==
- Murji'ah
- Ibn Kullab
- Jahm bin Safwan
- Jahmi school
