= Muqatil ibn Sulayman =

8th-century Mufassir (Qur'ānic Exegete)

Abū-l Ḥassan Muqātil ibn Sulaymān Al-Balkhī

Personal life
- Died: 767 CE (150 Hijri)
- Era: Early Islam
- Main interest(s): Tafsir, Hadith
- Notable work: Tafsīr Muqatil
- Occupation: Scholar of Islam, Mufassir

Religious life
- Religion: Islam

Muslim leader
- Influenced: Ibn Karram

Muqātil ibn Sulaymān (Arabic: أبو الحسن مقاتل بن سليمان البلخى, romanized: Abū-l Ḥassan Muqātil ibn Sulaymān Al-Balkhī) (d. 767 C.E.) was an 8th-century Muslim scholar of the Quran, controversial for his anthropomorphism. He wrote one of the earliest, if not first, commentaries of the Qur'an which is still available today.

Muqatil is the author of a tafsir (commentary) on the Quran that John Wansbrough considers the oldest surviving complete tafsir and discusses in some detail. This work was still in manuscript when Wansbrough wrote but has since been published.

Muqatil believed that God is a physical being with body parts, whether small or large, such as hands, feet and both eyes.

== Biography ==
Muqatil were born in Balkh, there are no works that date his birth, but some have estimated his birth year to be around 80 H. His father named Sulayman, although several chroniclers has confused that his father was named Hayyan.^{α}

He spent his early life in both Balkh and Marw. In Balkh, he was impacted by the religious diversity it had in the pre-Islamic era. He later migrated to Marw to get married. During the caliphate of Marwan II, Muqatil was involved in the civil war between the Abbasids and Umayyads. With the end of Umayyad rule he migrated to Iraq, settling in Basra and then moving to Baghdad. Due to possible Zaydi influence, he preferred the Abbasids to the previous Umayyad government, and some sources indicate that he would frequent the Abbasid court. Once, when visiting the Caliph al-Mansur, a fly sat on his face. Muqatil remarked that God had created the fly to humble the tyrants.

He later returned to Basra where he died in 150 H (767 CE).

== Assessment ==
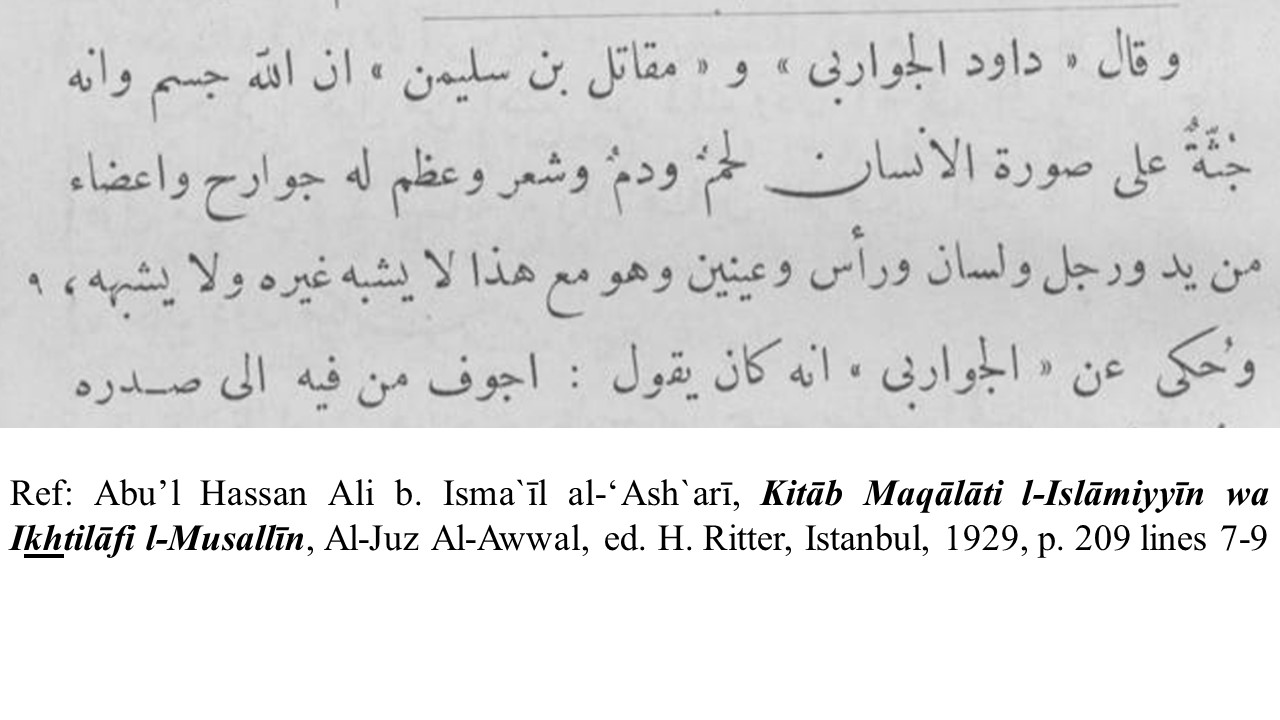
Anthropomorphic views ascribed to Muqatil b. Suleyman

The tafsir (interpretation) of Muqatil was highly regarded by various classical Islamic teaching scholars., and his commentary on Quran chapter Al-Inshiqaq has been preserved into modern era and translated into English by Nicolai Sinai.

=== Interpretation of Divine Attributes ===
Muqatil was known for theological opposition against the contemporary Mu'tazilism, as his ideas related to physical aspects and likening God to human image and activity. His views on divine anthropomorphism were notorious to later generations, but in spite of his “extreme" corporealism, he employed ta'wil in his tafsir even on verses on the attributes of Allah believed by many to show the contradiction in his thought. Muqatil Ibn Sulayman also strongly associated "commanding right" with furthering the monotheism that he taught, but also with a pacifist approach.

Muqatil was accused for being interpreting the divine attributes in a literal, sometimes anthropomorphic sense, affirming Wajh Allah (the divine countenance), as a literal face, Ayn Allah (the divine eye) as a literal eye, Yad Allah (the divine hand) as a literal hand. He stated that God sat on the throne – describing Istiwa as Istaqarra (settlement), although he states that he did this before creating the creation. Closer inspection of his Tafsir yields that he inclined towards anthropomorphist interpretation of the Kursi (throne) and the right side of God (as well as the seeing of God which is seen as anthropomorphic by the Mu'tazila who thought God can only be seen if he is a Jism (body)). Other views reported from Muqatil is that he said that Allah (God in Islam) spoke through his mouth to Moses and he reportedly narrated the following Hadith:

During the end of the day someone calls, where is the friend of Allah? Then, the group of angels step forward to sit with Him on the throne until they touch His shoulder.

Another example of alleged anthrophomorphic view of Muqatil was attributed to his statement that God possessed bodily parts such as flesh, blood, hair, bones and such. Some contemporary Muslim scholars were convinced of Muqatil's extreme anthropomorphism that they even came up with the term "Muqatiliyyah" to designate a sect which allegedly followed Muqatil in such views. Furthermore, Al-Ash'ari reports that Muqatil and Dawud al-Jawabiri, said that God is a body and possesses an image like a human being with flesh, blood, hair, bones and limbs such as hand, leg, head, and eyes, though he states that they said that with all of these he is completely unlike the creation, and that the creation does not resemble him.

=== Debate with Jahm bin Safwan ===
There was an intense theological and political debate that took place in the mosque of Marw between Muqatil and Jahm bin Safwan (d. 128 H/ 746 CE), regarding the divine attributes and a dispute between two political figures that Muqatil and Jahm were affiliated with. Each of them ended up writing a book refuting the other, and Muqatil used his political links to get Jahm expelled from Balkh, having him sent to Termez. In 128 H, in a subsequent battle with Muqatil's sponsor, Jahm was killed. The accusations of anthropomorphism against Muqatil were seen as the logical opposite to those who held the views of complete denial of Names of God in Islam and its divine attributes by Jahm bin Safwan, to whom the term Jahmiyya was attributed (as the opposite of "Muqatiliyyah"). The majority of Sunni scholarships thus positioned themselves in the middle, between the two extremes, neither negating God's attributes nor likening them to the creation.

=== Reception ===
The reputation of Muqatil among medieval scholars of Islam was generally negative, as several notable scholars of Islamic teaching denouncing him, such as:

- Abu Hanifa (d. 150 AH) criticised his theology, Abdullah Ibn Mubarak (d. 181 H/ 797 CE) criticised his methodology (particularly that he did not quote Hadith with chains of transmission), and the accusation of being a liar is attributed to Wakee ibn al-Jarrah (d. 197/ 812 CE).^{[γ]} Furthermore, Abu Hanifah once warned Abu Yusuf (d. 182/798) against two schools of thought he viewed as misguided in Greater Khorasan; the Jahmiyyah and the Muqatiliyyah.
- Al-Shafi'i (d. 204 AH) said: "May Allah destroy him." Ibn Hajar al-Asqalani comments: "Al-Shafi'i made this remark only because Muqatil had become notorious for advocating the doctrine of corporealism (tajsim)."
- Al-Tabari (d. 310 H), even quoted his view on the mysterious letters in the Qur'an as numerical counts, but was reluctant to name Muqatil as his source, stating he was among those whose views were not to be trusted. This could suggest that Muqatil's reputation had become so tainted, that few were willing to be associated with him by al-Tabari's time.
- Ibn Hazm also accused him for his alleged anthrophomorphism view.
- Ibn Hajar al-Asqalani in particular also similarly denounced both the thoughts of Jahm and Muqatil. Although Ibn Hajr praised Muqatil for his expertise in Tafsir (Quran interpretation).
- Ibn Rajab al-Hanbali stated that the early scholars (as-salaf) rejected Muqatil's views after they became known after his debate with Jahm. Some early traditionalists are said to have gone too far, with Makki ibn Ibrahim (d. 215 H), the teacher of al-Bukhari, permitting the killing of Muqatil. Some, such as Kharijah ibn Mus'ab (d. 168 H/ 785 CE), were so outraged that they said they would do the deed themselves if they could.

However, some latter scholars held a different assessment of Muqatil:

- Ibn Taymiyyah, however, rejects the theological criticisms of Muqatil, arguing that those who criticised him, took their material from his enemies, specifically Al-Ash'ari was to blame for taking biographical information from the works of the Mu'tazilites. He also rejected the accusation of anthropomorphism (Tashbih) for Muqatil, saying he could not find any traces of anything he would consider anthropomorphic in Muqatil's works,^{[δ]} and therefore he could not be an anthropomorphist. He quotes al-Shafi'i saying, "Whoever desires tafsir, he is dependent on Muqatil. Whosoever wants fiqh (jurisprudence), he is dependent on Abu Hanifa."^{[e]} Dr. Abdulkader al-Hossein, however, believes that this quote is falsely attributed to al-Shafi'i. Ibn Taymiyyah uses his citation to argue that Muqatil should be considered as expert of Quranic interpretation, despite, according to Ibn Taymiyyah, people disagreeing with some of his other views.
- Contemporary Saudi scholar Abdullah al-Ghunayman, author of the commentary on Ibn Taymiyyah's Al-Aqidah Al-Waasitiyyah, argues that he could not find anything he would consider anthropomorphic from Muqatil, arguing that to be reliable, ones views must be taken from one's own works, and not from the works of an opponent. Al-Ghunayman then says that the word Mushabbih has become a catch word to accuse one's opponents because of their different views.

=== Hadith ===
On the field of Hadith tradition, Muqatil was also rejected in Hadith, being accused of reporting hadith from those he never met, and in one instance, reportedly asking a local ruler if he wanted him to forge a Hadith. Hadith scholars who denounced Muqatil consisted of:

- Ahmad ibn Hanbal and Ibn Abi Hatim has said that Hadith found in the works Muqatil are fabricated, while the transmission chains of his Hadith traditions, according to Ahmad, are nonexistent at all.
- Muhammad al-Bukhari (d. 256 H) rejected him saying he has nothing at all (transmittable).
- Ibn Hibban (d. 354 H), author of the Sahih, summarised the opinions of the early generations on Muqatil thus, "He relied on Jewish and Christian sources in his interpretation of the Qurʾān; he was also an anthropomorphist assimilating God to His creatures; and in addition he used to forge ḥadīths"
- Al-Khatib al-Baghdadi (d. 463 H) was the first to accuse him of being a story teller, and the historian Ibn Asakir (d. 571 H) was the first to be explicit about this.
- Al-Daraqutni (d. 385) also consider Muqatil as liar on his Hadith authorities.
- Ibn Sa'd (d. 230) reported that Muqatil was viewed negative by scholastic community of Hadith." Ibn Sa'd criticized that Muqatil did not use the isnaads (chains of narration) properly. However, Ibn Sa'd praised Muqatil in his record of "biography of Muqatil", that he stated Muqatil was an expert of tafsir with some knowledge transcribed from Al-Dahhak ibn Muzahim and Ata ibn Abi Rabah, students of Ibn Abbas. Outside of Hadith science, Ibn Sa'd describes Muqatil as one of the Fuqaha' and Hadith scholars in Khurasan and does not give him a date of death. There is however unanimous consensus that Muqatil was not a scholar of Hadith. He did not use the isnaads (chains of narration) properly. Amidst the scholars of Islam, Muqatil's reputation is that of a storyteller.
- Ibn Taymiyyah also criticized Muqatil in the field of Hadith, despite his expertise in tafsir.
- Another prominent Hadith scholars such as Yahya ibn Ma'in, Waki' ibn al-Jarrah and Al-Nasa'i, along with modern contemporary Hadith expert Al-Albani also criticized the authority of Muqatil's narrations being unreliable.

== Appendix ==
=== Notes ===
^α This topic was written by al-Dhahabi in his book, Mizan al-Itidal, regarding the confusion of identity of father of Muqatil; either Sulaiman or Hayyan.
^β As discussed above – others such as Ibn ‛Abd al-Raḥmān al-Malṭī (d. 377/987) and Ibn Taymiyyah (d. 728/1328), did not consider him to have been an anthropomorphist.
^γ Both Ibn Mubarak and Wakee' were students of Abu Hanifa.
^δ Ibn Taymiyyah himself was accused of anthropomorphism, and was put on trial, found guilty and imprisoned for this.
^e This is slightly different from what al-Mizzi, Ibn Taymiyyah's contemporary, reports of al-Shafi'i: "Whoever wants to study tafsīr he has to rely on Muqātil; whoever wants to study ḥadīth he has to rely on Mālik; and whoever wants to study kalam he has to rely on Abū Ḥanīfa"
