= Ḍirār ibn ʻAmr =

8th–9th-century Muslim theologian and jurist

Ḍirār ibn ʿAmr
- Died: c. 815
- Occupations: Theologian, jurist
- Era: 8th–9th century

Ḍirār ibn ʿAmr (died c. 815) was an early Muslim theologian and jurist associated with the intellectual debates of the 8th and early 9th centuries. He was active in Kufa, Basra, and Baghdad, and is known for theological positions that differed from those of several contemporary schools. Although later sources associated him with the Mu'tazila, his doctrines were distinctive and his classification within that movement was disputed.

== Life ==
Ḍirār ibn ʿAmr was active in the intellectual and religious environment of early Abbasid-era Iraq. According to the available biographical accounts, he was associated with Kufa before moving to other major intellectual centres, including Basra and Baghdad. The exact details of his life and the chronology of his movements are not fully established in the surviving sources.

Ḍirār was associated with the teachings of Wasil ibn Ata, one of the early figures connected with the formation of the Mu'tazila. However, later accounts indicate that he developed positions of his own and was not consistently regarded as a member of the movement. In his Kitab al-Maqalat (Book of Doctrinal Opinions), Abu Ali al-Jubba'i reportedly described Ḍirār as having initially held a position associated with predestination before changing his views following a theological debate.

The heresiographical writer al-Baghdadi attributed to Ḍirār an early formulation of the concept of kasb (acquisition), which later became an important element of Ash'ari theology. The concept sought to explain how human beings could be held responsible for their actions while maintaining that God is their creator.

== Theology ==
=== Human action and responsibility ===
One of the theological positions attributed to Ḍirār concerned the relationship between divine power and human responsibility. According to accounts preserved by later theologians, he maintained that God creates human actions while human beings acquire them and are consequently accountable for them. This position is associated with the concept of kasb (acquisition).

The position differed from the emphasis on human free choice found among Mu'tazilite theologians, while also differing from the more deterministic positions associated with Jahm ibn Safwan. Later theologians, including those associated with the Ash'ari school, developed related explanations of divine creation and human acquisition. The precise relationship between Ḍirār's formulation and later Ash'ari doctrine remains a matter of historical interpretation.

=== Bodies and accidents ===
Ḍirār is also associated with a distinctive theory of bodies and their properties. In accounts of his thought, bodies are described in terms of combinations of accidents, meaning properties or qualities that exist in substances and undergo change. His views formed part of wider early Islamic debates about the nature of bodies, attributes, and the created world.

His position was discussed in relation to other theologians who disagreed about the existence and nature of accidents. Al-Asamm, for example, is associated with a different approach to the question. These debates formed part of the broader development of early Islamic speculative theology.

Ḍirār was also reported to have rejected the idea of an immortal human soul. Accounts of his views on the afterlife further describe his position that the perception of God in Paradise would occur through a special sense distinct from the ordinary senses.

=== The afterlife ===
Theological accounts attribute to Ḍirār the view that Paradise and Hell would be created at the time of the final judgement, rather than existing beforehand. He was also associated with the idea that people in Paradise would perceive God through a special faculty of perception. These positions were discussed by later theologians in their accounts of early Islamic beliefs about the afterlife.

=== The caliphate ===
Ḍirār is reported to have rejected the view that the office of caliph was necessarily restricted to the Quraysh, the tribe to which Muhammad belonged. This position formed part of early debates about political authority and the qualifications required for leadership of the Muslim community.

== Works ==
=== Kitab al-Tahrish (Book of Incitement) ===
Ḍirār is traditionally credited with several theological works, most of which are no longer extant. The best-known surviving work attributed to him is Kitab al-Tahrish (Book of Incitement), a text dealing with religious disagreements and the use of transmitted reports in debates among early Muslim groups.

The work was published in 2014 in an edition prepared by Hüseyin Hansu and Mehmet Keskin. The edition was based on a manuscript preserved in Yemen. Its publication made the text available to modern researchers studying early Islamic theology and the development of religious and sectarian debates.

The text presents different theological and religious positions through discussions and reports attributed to various groups. It is of particular interest to historians because it provides material for studying the disagreements that existed among early Muslim communities. Sean W. Anthony's review of the 2014 edition discusses the work and its significance for the study of early Islamic religious debates.

The title Kitab al-Tahrish refers to incitement or the provocation of conflict. The work examines disagreements among religious groups and the reports used in support of their respective positions. Its treatment of transmitted traditions has attracted scholarly attention, particularly in relation to the use and evaluation of reports in early theological controversies.

=== Other works ===
The bibliographical work Kitab al-Fihrist (The Catalogue), compiled by Ibn al-Nadim, attributes numerous other works to Ḍirār. These included writings on theological disputes, religious groups, and responses to the views of other communities. Most of the works attributed to him are considered lost.

== See also ==
- Mu'tazila
- Ash'ari
- Islamic theology
