= Uthman ibn Sa'id al-Darimi =

Theologian from Iraq

- Title: Imam al-Hafiz

Personal life
- Born: 815 Herat, Abbasid Caliphate (modern-day Afghanistan)
- Died: 894 Herat, Saffarid dynasty (modern-day Afghanistan)
- Main interest(s): Qur'an, Hadith, Aqida, Refuting Jahmi and Karami ideas
- Notable work: al-Naqd 'ala al-Marisi al-Jahmi al-Anid

Religious life
- Religion: Islam
- Denomination: Sunni
- Jurisprudence: Shafi'i
- Creed: Athari

Muslim leader
- Influenced by: Al-Shafi'i, Yahya ibn Ma'in, Ali ibn al-Madini, Ahmad ibn Hanbal
- Influenced: Ibn Taymiyya, Ibn Qayyim al-Jawziyya, Ibn Abd al-Hadi, Mar'i al-Karmi, Shams al-Din al-Saffarini and all Salafis

Uthman ibn Sa'id al-Darimi (Arabic: عثمان بن سعيد الدارمي), full name Abu Sa'id Uthman ibn Sa'id ibn Khalid ibn Sa'id al-Darimi, was a 9th-century Islamic scholar and Athari theologian. A narrator of hadith, he was known for being extremely strict against the Jahmi and Karami schools of thought which prevailed during his time. His best known work is al-Naqd 'ala al-Marisi al-Jahmi al-Anid, a detailed refutation against one of his contemporaries, Bishr al-Marisi.

== Biography ==
Uthman ibn Sa'id al-Darimi was born in the year 815. He adhered to the Shafi'i school of thought. al-Darimi learned hadith and other prophetic traditions from the leading scholars of his time, Yahya ibn Ma'in, Ali ibn al-Madini and the founder of the Hanbali school, Ahmad ibn Hanbal. He became a narrator of hadith, and later scholars like Ibn Hibban and Hakim al-Nishapuri would narrate hadith from him.

Uthman ibn Sa'id al-Darimi died in the year 894.

== Controversy ==
Uthman ibn Sa'id al-Darimi was known for his aggression against the Jahmi school. He was severe against Bishr al-Marisi, even going as far as to excommunicate him and write a book of refutations against him. His writings were quoted by later traditionist Athari scholars like Ibn Taymiyya.

Aside from the Jahmis, al-Darimi was also against the Karami school. He stood against them, denouncing them repeatedly for their anthropomorphistic beliefs regarding God's nature. His persistent efforts to defame the Karamiyya resulted in their founder, Ibn Karram, being expelled from Nishapur.

The historian al-Dhahabi said that al-Darimi was a “stinger in the eyes of the heretics.”

== Works ==
- al-Naqd 'ala al-Marisi al-Jahmi al-Anid
- al-Radd 'ala al-Jahmiyya
- al-Musnad al-Kabir
- al-Jami'
- al-Tafsir

== See also ==
- List of Atharis
- List of Islamic scholars
