= Al-Ja'd ibn Dirham =

8th-century Muslim theologian

al-Ja'd ibn Dirham
- الجعد بن درهم
- Born: Khorasan
- Died: c. 742 CE; Kufa, Iraq

Philosophical work
- Era: Islamic Golden Age
- School: Mutazilite (formerly)
- Main interests: Kalam · Philosophy
- Notable ideas: Quranic createdness

al-Ja'd ibn Dirham (Arabic: الجعد بن درهم) was an 8th-century Muslim theologian who promoted the idea of Quranic createdness. He was also the personal tutor of the last Umayyad caliph, Marwan II.

== Relations with the Umayyad state ==
The Umayyad prince Muhammad ibn Marwan appointed al-Ja'd ibn Dirham as the personal tutor for his son, Marwan II, who was the last of the Umayyad rulers (r. 744–750) until he was deposed by the invading Abbasids. Despite these relations, the Umayyad caliph Hisham ibn 'Abd al-Malik still ordered the arrest of al-Ja'd due to his theology, which was considered heretical by the scholars around him.

== Theology ==
al-Ja'd ibn Dirham was formerly a Mutazilite. However, he would later develop a theology which stated that the divine attributes of God should be merely negated, including the divine speech. Another aspect of his theology included the belief in Quranic createdness that the Qur'an is a created thing. In regards to the Prophets of Islam and biblical figures, al-Ja'd denied that God spoke to Moses or took Abraham as a friend.

This theology was a basis for the ideas of the Jahmi school, founded by Jahm ibn Safwan, a follower of al-Ja'd ibn Dirham.

One of the early critics of his theology was the Tabi'in and historian Wahb ibn Munabbih, who differed with him on the views of the divine attributes. According to Ibn Kathir, al-Ja'd was influenced by the ideas of Bayan ibn Sam'an al-Tamimi, an earlier theologian who believed in Quranic createdness as well.

== Execution ==
An arrest warrant was made for al-Ja'd ibn Dirham, and he was apprehended in Kufa in the year 742. On the day of Eid al-Adha, he was publicly executed via beheading by the governor of Iraq, Khalid al-Qasri. Before the execution, al-Qasri is reported to have said:

On this day, I will sacrifice al-Ja'd ibn Dirham; for he said that Allah did not take Ibrahim as a friend, nor did He address Moses directly; exalted is Allah and free is He from what al-Ja'd had said.

== See also ==
- Qadariyyah
- Jahmi
- Jahm ibn Safwan
