= Sunni Islam =

Largest branch of Islam

Sunni Islam (Note: (/ˈsuːni/; Arabic: أهل السنة, romanized: Ahl as-Sunnah, lit. 'The People of the Sunnah'). It is also called Sunnism in academic studies and sometimes as Orthodox Islam, although some scholars view this translation as inappropriate.) is the largest branch of Islam and the largest religious denomination in the world. It holds that Muhammad did not appoint any successor and that his closest companion Abu Bakr (r. 632–634) rightfully succeeded him as the caliph of the Muslim community, being appointed at the meeting of Saqifa. This contrasts with the Shia view, which holds that Muhammad appointed Ali ibn Abi Talib (r. 656–661) as his successor. Nevertheless, Sunnis revere Ali, along with Abu Bakr, Umar (r. 634–644) and Uthman (r. 644–656) as 'rightly-guided caliphs'.

The term Sunni means those who observe the sunnah, the practices of Muhammad. The Quran, together with hadith (especially the Six Books) and ijma (scholarly consensus), form the basis of all traditional jurisprudence within Sunni Islam. Sharia legal rulings are derived from these basic sources, in conjunction with consideration of public welfare and juristic discretion, using the principles of jurisprudence developed by the four legal schools: Hanafi, Hanbali, Maliki and Shafi'i.

In matters of creed, the Sunni tradition upholds the six pillars of iman (faith) and comprises the Ash'ari and Maturidi schools of kalam (theology) as well as the textualist Athari school. Sunnis regard the first four caliphs Abu Bakr (r. 632–634), Umar (r. 634–644), Uthman (r. 644–656) and Ali (r. 656–661) as rashidun (rightly-guided) and revere the sahaba, tabi'in, and tabi al-tabi'in as the salaf (predecessors).

Sunni Islam is sometimes referred to as "Orthodox Islam". However, some scholars of Islam, such as John Burton, believe that there is no such thing as "Orthodox Islam".

== Etymology ==
=== Sunna ===
The Arabic term sunnah, which Sunnis are named after, dates back to pre-Islamic language. It was used for "the right path that has always been followed". The term gained greater political significance after the murder of the third caliph, Uthman (r. 644–656). It is said Malik al-Ashtar, a famous follower of Ali, provided encouragement during the Battle of Siffin with the expression "Ali's political rival Mu'awiya kills the sunna". After the battle, it was agreed that "the righteous Sunnah, the unifying, not the divisive" ("as-Sunna al-ʿādila al-ǧāmiʿa ġair al-mufarriqa") should be consulted to resolve the conflict. The time when the term sunna became the short form for "Sunnah of the Prophet" (Sunnat an-Nabī) is still unknown. During the Umayyad Caliphate, several political movements, including the Shia and the Kharijites rebelled against the formation of the state. They led their battles in the name of "the book of God (Qur'an) and the Sunnah of his Prophet". During the second Civil War (680–92) the Sunna term received connotations critical of Shi'i doctrines (Tashayyu'). It is recorded by Masrūq ibn al-Adschdaʿ (died 683), who was a Mufti in Kufa, a need to love the first two caliphs Abū Bakr and ʿUmar ibn al-Khaṭṭāb and acknowledge their priority (Fadā'il). A disciple of Masrūq, the scholar ash-Shaʿbī (died between 721 and 729), who first sided with the Shia in Kufa during Civil War, but turned away in disgust by their fanaticism and finally decided to join the Umayyad Caliph ʿAbd al-Malik, popularized the concept of Sunnah. It is also passed down by ash-Shaʿbī that he took offense at the hatred on ʿĀʾiša bint Abī Bakr and considered it a violation of the Sunnah.

The term Sunna instead of the longer expression ahl as-sunna or ahl as-sunnah wa l-jamāʻah as a group-name for Sunnis is a relatively young phenomenon. It was probably Ibn Taymiyyah, who used the short-term for the first time. It was later popularized by pan-Islamic scholars such as Muhammad Rashid Rida in his treatise as-Sunna wa-š-šiʿa au al-Wahhābīya wa-r-Rāfiḍa: Ḥaqāʾiq dīnīya taʾrīḫīya iǧtimaʿīya iṣlaḥīya ("The Sunna and the Shia, Or Wahhabism and Rāfidism: Religious history, sociological and reform-oriented facts") published in 1928–29. The term Sunnah is usually used in Arabic discourse as designation for Sunni Muslims, when they are intended to be contrasted with Shias. The word pair Sunnah–Shia is also used on Western research literature to denote the Sunni–Shia contrast.

=== Ahl as-Sunna ===
One of the earliest supporting documents for ahl as-sunna derives from the Basric scholar Muhammad Ibn Siri (died 728). His is mentioned in the Sahih of Muslim ibn al-Hajjaj, and quoted having said: "Formerly one did not ask about the Isnad. But when the fitna started, one said: 'Name us your informants'. One would then respond to them: If they were Sunnah people, you accept their hadith. But if they are people of the Innovations, the hadith was rejected". G.H.A. Juynboll assumed, the term fitna in this statement is not related to the first Civil War (665–661) after murder of ʿUthmān ibn ʿAffān, but the second Civil War (680–692) in which the Islamic community was split into four parties (Abd Allah ibn al-Zubayr, the Umayyads, the Shia under al-Mukhtār ibn Abī ʿUbaid and the Kharijites). The term ahl as-sunna designated in this situation whose, who stayed away from heretic teachings of the different warring parties.

The term ahl as-sunna was always a laudatory designation. Abu Hanifa (died 769), who sympathized with Murdshia, insisted that this were "righteous people and people of the Sunnah" (ahl al-ʿadl wa-ahl as-sunna). According to Josef van Ess this term did not mean more than "honorable and righteous believing people". Among Hanafits the designation ahl as-sunna and ahl al-ʿadl (people of the righteous) remained interchangeable for a long time. Thus the Hanafite Abū l-Qāsim as-Samarqandī (died 953), who composed a catechism for the Samanides, used sometimes one expression and sometimes another for his own group.

Singular to ahl as-sunna was ṣāḥib sunna (adherent to the sunnah). This expression was used for example by ʿAbd Allāh ibn al-Mubārak (died 797) for a person, who distances himself from the teachings of Shia, Kharijites, Qadarites and Murjites. In addition, the Nisba adjective sunnī was also used for the individual person. Thus it has been recorded, the Kufic scholar of the Quran Abū Bakr ibn ʿAyyāsh (died 809) was asked, how he was a "sunni". He responded the following: "The one who, when the heresies are mentioned, doesn't get excited about any of them". The Andalusiaian scholar Ibn Hazm (died 1064) taught later that those who confess Islam can be divided into four groups: ahl as-sunna, Mutazilites, Murjites, Shites, Kharijites. The Muʿtazilites replaced the Qadarites here.

In the 9th century, one started to extent the term ahl as-sunna with further positive additions. Abu al-Hasan al-Ashari used for his own group expressions like ahl as-sunna wa-l-istiqāma ("people of Sunna and Straightness"), ahl as-sunna wa-l-ḥadīṯ ("people of Sunnah and of the Hadith") or ahl al-ḥaqq wa-s-sunna ("people of Truth and of the Sunnah").

=== Ahl as-Sunna wa l-Jamāʻah ===
The first appearances of the expression 'ahl as-sunna wa l-jama'ah are entirely clear. In his Mihna edict, the Abbasite Caliph Al-Ma'mūn (reigned 813–33) criticized a group of people who related themselves to the sunnah (nasabū anfusa-hum ilā s-sunna) and claimed they are the "people of truth, religion and community" (ahl al-ḥaqq wa-d-dīn wa-l-jamāʿah). Sunna and jamāʿah are already connected here. As a pair, these terms already appear in the 9th century. It is recorded that the disciple of Ahmad ibn Hanbal Harb ibn Ismail as-Sirjdshani (died 893) created a writing with the title as-Sunna wa l-Jamāʿah, to which the Mutazilite Abu al-Qasim al-Balchi wrote a refutation later. Al-Jubba'i (died 916) tells in his Kitāb al-Maqālāt, that Ahmad ibn Hanbal attributed to his students the predicate sunnī jamāʿah ("Sunni Community"). This indicates that the Hanbalis were the first to use the phrase ahl as-sunna wa l-jamāʿah as a self-designation.

It was narrated from ‘Awf bin Malik that the Messenger of Allah (ﷺ) said : “The Jews split into seventy-one sects, one of which will be in Paradise and seventy in Hell. The Christians split into seventy-two sects, seventy-one of which will be in Hell and one in Paradise. I swear by the One Whose Hand is the soul of Muhammad, my nation will split into seventy-three sects, one of which will be in Paradise and seventy-two in Hell.” It was said: “O Messenger of Allah, who are they?” He said: “The main body” (al-Jamāʻah).

— Sunan Ibn Majah 3992

Karramiyya theology, founded by Muhammad ibn Karram (died 859) referred to the sunnah and community. In praise of their school founder, they passed down a hadith, according to which Muhammad predicted that at the end of times a man named Muhammad ibn Karram will appear, who will restore the sunna and the community (as-sunna wa l-jamāʿah) and take Hidraj from Chorasan to Jerusalem, just how Muhammad himself took a Hidraj from Mecca to Medina. According to the testimony of the Transoxianian scholar Abu al-Yusr al-Bazdawi (died 1099), the Kullabites (followers of the Basrian scholar Ibn Kullab [died 855]) referred to themselves as also being among the ahl as-sunna wa l-jama.

Abu al-Hasan al-Ashari used the expression ahl as-sunna wa l-jamāʿah rarely, and preferred another combination. Later Asharites like al-Isfaranini (died 1027) and Abd al-Qahir al-Baghdadi (died 1078) also used the expression ahl as-sunna wa l-jamāʿah and used them in their works to designate the teachings of their own school. According to al-Bazdawi, all Asharites in his time said they belong to the ahl as-sunna wa l-jamāʿah. During this time, the term was used as a self-designation by the Hanafite Maturidites in Transoxiania, used frequently by Abu al-Layth al-Samarqandi (died 983), Abu Schakur as-Salimi (died 1086) and al-Bazdawi himself. They used the term as a contrast to their enemies, among them Hanafites in the West, who have been followers of the Mutazilites. Al-Bazdawī also contrasted the Ahl as-Sunnah wa l-Jamāʻah with Ahl al-Ḥadīth, "because they would adhere to teachings contrary to the Quran".

According to Schams ad-Dīn al-Maqdisī (late 10th century) was the expression ahl as-sunna wa l-jamāʿah a laudatory term during his time, similar to ahl al-ʿadl wa-t-tawḥīd ("people of Righteousness and Divine Unity"), which was used for Mutazilites or generally designations like Mu'minūn ('believer') or aṣḥāb al-hudā ('people of guidance') for Muslims, who have been seen as righteous believers. Since the expression ahl as-sunna wa l-jamāʿah was used with a demand for righteous belief, it has been translated as 'orthodox' in academic research.

There are different opinions regarding what the term jama in the phrase ahl as-sunna wa l-jama actually means, among Muslim scholars. In the Sunni Creed by at-Tahawi (died 933), the term jama contrasts several times with the Arabic term furqa ("division, sectarianism"). Thus at-Tahāwī explains that jama is considered true or right (ḥaqq wa-ṣawāb) and furqa as aberration and punishment (zaiġ wa-ʿaḏāb). Ibn Taymiyyah argues that jama, as opposed to furqa, has the inherent meaning of iǧtimāʿ ("Coming together, being together, agreement"). Furthermore, he connects it with the principle of Ijma, a third juridical source after the Book (Quran), and the Sunnah. The Ottoman scholar Muslih ad-Din al-Qastallani (died 1495) held the opinion that jama means 'path of the Sahaba' (ṭarīqat aṣ-ṣaḥāba). The modern Indonesian theologian Nurcholish Madjid (died 2005) interpreted jama as an inclusive concept: it means a society open for pluralism and dialogue, though it does not particularly emphasize it.

In the Meeting of the Aqidah Expert Panel of the Department of Islamic Development Malaysia (JAKIM) held on 28 December 2010 at the Malaysian Islamic Training Institute (ILIM), Bangi, Selangor, the panel decided that the definition of Ahl al-Sunnah wa’l-Jama‘ah is:

“A group who understands and adheres to the Qur’an and the Sunnah of the Prophet SAW through the Companions, the Tabi‘in, and the Tabi‘ al-Tabi‘in, who remained steadfast with them in the principles of creed (aqidah), law (shari‘ah), and ethics (akhlaq).”

Explanation of the definition:

- a) They are a group who understands and adheres to the Qur’an and the Sunnah of the Prophet SAW according to the methodology and approach of the salaf (the Ahl al-Hadith/Atharites) and khalaf (the Ash‘arites and the Maturidites).
- b) They are a group with a balanced (wasatiyyah) understanding — neither extreme nor overly lax. This excludes the Khawarij, Shi‘ah Rafidah, Qadariyyah, Jabariyyah, Mu‘tazilah, anti-hadith groups, liberal Islam, religious pluralism, and the like.
- c) They are a group who prioritizes Islamic unity and brotherhood over enmity, peace over conflict, and uphold the principle of not idolizing leaders, not being fanatical to the extent of declaring other Muslims as disbelievers (takfir) or deviants.

== History ==
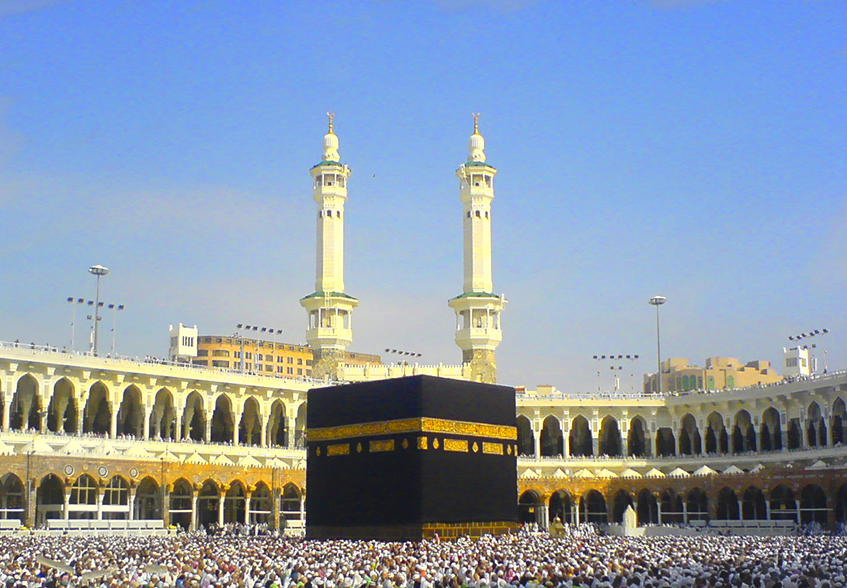
Masjid al-Haram, the home of the Kaaba, in Mecca is the largest and most important mosque in the world.

One common mistake is to assume that Sunni Islam represents a normative Islam that emerged during the period after Muhammad's death, and that Sufism and Shi'ism developed out of Sunni Islam. This perception is partly due to the reliance on highly ideological sources that have been accepted as reliable historical works, and also because the vast majority of the Muslim population is Sunni. Both Sunnism and Shiism are the end products of several centuries of competition between ideologies. Both sects used each other to further cement their own identities and doctrines.

The first four caliphs are known among Sunnis as the Rāshidun or "Rightly-Guided Ones". Sunni recognition includes the aforementioned Abu Bakr as the first, Umar as the second, Uthman as the third, and Ali as the fourth. Sunnis recognised different rulers as the caliph, though they barely ever included anyone in the list of the rightly guided ones or Rāshidun after the murder of Ali, until the caliphate was constitutionally abolished in Turkey on 3 March 1924.

=== Transition of caliphate into dynastic monarchy of Banu Umayya ===
The seeds of metamorphosis of caliphate into kingship were sown, as the second caliph Umar had feared, as early as the regime of the third caliph Uthman, who appointed many of his kinsmen from his clan Banu Umayya, including Marwān and Walid bin Uqba on important government positions, becoming the main cause of turmoil resulting in his murder and the ensuing infighting during Ali's time and rebellion by Muāwiya, another of Uthman's kinsman. This ultimately resulted in the establishment of firm dynastic rule of Banu Umayya after Husain, the younger son of Ali from Fātima, was killed at the Battle of Karbalā. The rise to power of Banu Umayya, the Meccan tribe of elites who had vehemently opposed Muhammad under the leadership of Abu Sufyān, Muāwiya's father, right up to the conquest of Mecca by Muhammad, as his successors with the accession of Uthman to caliphate, replaced the egalitarian society formed as a result of Muhammad's revolution to a society stratified between haves and have-nots as a result of nepotism, and in the words of El-Hibri through "the use of religious charity revenues (zakāt) to subsidise family interests, which Uthman justified as 'al-sila' (pious filial support)". Ali, during his rather brief regime after Uthman maintained austere life style and tried hard to bring back the egalitarian system and supremacy of law over the ruler idealised in Muhammad's message, but faced continued opposition, and wars one after another by Aisha-Talhah-Zubair, by Muāwiya and finally by the Khārjites. After he was murdered, his followers immediately elected Hasan ibn Ali his elder son from Fātima to succeed him. Hasan shortly afterward signed a treaty with Muāwiya relinquishing power in favour of the latter, with a condition inter alia, that one of the two who will outlive the other will be the caliph, and that this caliph will not appoint a successor but will leave the matter of selection of the caliph to the public. Subsequently, Hasan was poisoned to death and Muawiya enjoyed unchallenged power. Dishonouring his treaty with Hasan, he nominated his son Yazid to succeed him. Upon Muāwiya's death, Yazid asked Husain, the younger brother of Hasan, Ali's son and Muhammad's grandson, to give his allegiance to Yazid, which he plainly refused. His caravan was cordoned by Yazid's army at Karbalā and he was killed with all his male companions – total 72 people, in a day long battle after which Yazid established himself as a sovereign, though strong public uprising erupted after his death against his dynasty to avenge the massacre of Karbalā, but Banu Umayya were able to quickly suppress them all and ruled the Muslim world, till they were finally overthrown by Banu Abbās.

=== Caliphate and the dynastic monarchy of Banu Abbās ===
The rule of and "caliphate" of Banu Umayya came to an end at the hands of Banu Abbās a branch of Banu Hāshim, the tribe of Muhammad, only to usher another dynastic monarchy styled as caliphate from 750 CE. This period is seen as formative in Sunni Islam as the founders of the four schools viz, Abu Hanifa, Malik ibn Anas, Shāfi'i and Ahmad bin Hanbal all practised during this time, so also did Jafar al Sādiq who elaborated the doctrine of imāmate, the basis for the Shi'a religious thought. There was no clearly accepted formula for determining succession in the Abbasid caliphate. Two or three sons or other relatives of the dying caliph emerged as candidates to the throne, each supported by his own party of supporters. A trial of strength ensued and the most powerful party won and expected favours of the caliph they supported once he ascended the throne. The caliphate of this dynasty ended with the death of the Caliph al-Ma'mun in 833 CE, when the period of Turkish domination began.

=== Sunni Islam in the contemporary era ===
Istiqlal Mosque in Jakarta, Indonesia. Indonesia has the largest population of Muslims in the world, the majority of whom are Sunni.

The fall, at the end of World War I of the Ottoman Empire, the biggest Sunni empire for six centuries, brought the caliphate to an end. This resulted in Sunni protests in far off places including the Khilafat Movement in India, which was later on upon gaining independence from Britain divided into Sunni-dominated Pakistan and secular India. Pakistan, the most populous Sunni state at its dawn, was later partitioned into Pakistan and Bangladesh. The demise of Ottoman caliphate also resulted in the emergence of Saudi Arabia, a dynastic absolute monarchy that championed the reformist doctrines of Muhammad ibn Abd al-Wahhab; the eponym of the Wahhabi movement. This was followed by a considerable rise in the influence of the Wahhabi, Salafiyya, Islamist and Jihadist movements that revived the doctrines of the Hanbali theologian Taqi Al-Din Ibn Taymiyyah (1263–1328 C.E/ 661–728 A.H), a fervent advocate of the traditions of the Sunni Imam Ahmad ibn Hanbal. The expediencies of Cold War resulted in the radicalisation of Afghan refugees in Pakistan who fought the communist regime backed by USSR forces in Afghanistan giving birth to the Taliban movement. After the fall of communist regime in Afghanistan and the ensuing civil war, Taliban wrestled power from the various Mujahidin factions in Afghanistan and formed a government under the leadership of Mohammed Omar, who was addressed as the Emir of the faithful, an honorific way of addressing the caliph. The Taliban regime was recognised by Pakistan and Saudi Arabia till after 9/11, perpetrated by Osama bin Laden – a Saudi national by birth and harboured by the Taliban – took place, resulting in a war on terror launched against the Taliban.

The sequence of events of the 20th century has led to resentment in some quarters of the Sunni community due to the loss of pre-eminence in several previously Sunni-dominated regions such as the Levant, Mesopotamia, the Balkans, the North Caucasus and the Indian sub continent. The latest attempt by a radical wing of Salafi-Jihadists to re-establish a Sunni caliphate was seen in the emergence of the militant group ISIL, whose leader Abu Bakr al-Baghdadi is known among his followers as caliph and Amir-al-mu'mineen, "The Commander of the Faithful". Such jihadism is opposed by many Imams, Muslim organizations, and faithful across the ummah.

Following the puritan approach of Ibn Kathir, Muhammad Rashid Rida, etc. many contemporary Tafsir (exegetic treatises) downplay the earlier significance of Biblical material (Isrā'iliyyāt). Half of the Arab commentaries reject Isrā'iliyyāt in general, while Turkish tafsir usually partly allow referring to Biblical material. Nevertheless, most non-Arabic commentators regard them as useless or not applicable. A direct reference to the Israeli–Palestinian conflict could not be found. It remains unclear whether the refusal of Isrā'iliyyāt is motivated by political discourse or by traditionalist thought alone. The usage of tafsir'ilmi is another notable characteristic of modern Sunni tafsir. Tafsir'ilmi stands for alleged scientific miracles found in the Qur'an. In short, the idea is that the Qur'an contains knowledge about subjects an author of the 7th century could not possibly have. Such interpretations are popular among many commentators. Some scholars, such as the Commentators of Al-Azhar University, reject this approach, arguing the Qur'an is a text for religious guidance, not for science and scientific theories that may be disproved later; thus tafsir'ilmi might lead to interpreting Qur'anic passages as falsehoods. Modern trends of Islamic interpretation are usually seen as adjusting to a modern audience and purifying Islam from alleged alterings, some of which are believed to be intentional corruptions brought into Islam to undermine and corrupt its message.

== Adherents ==
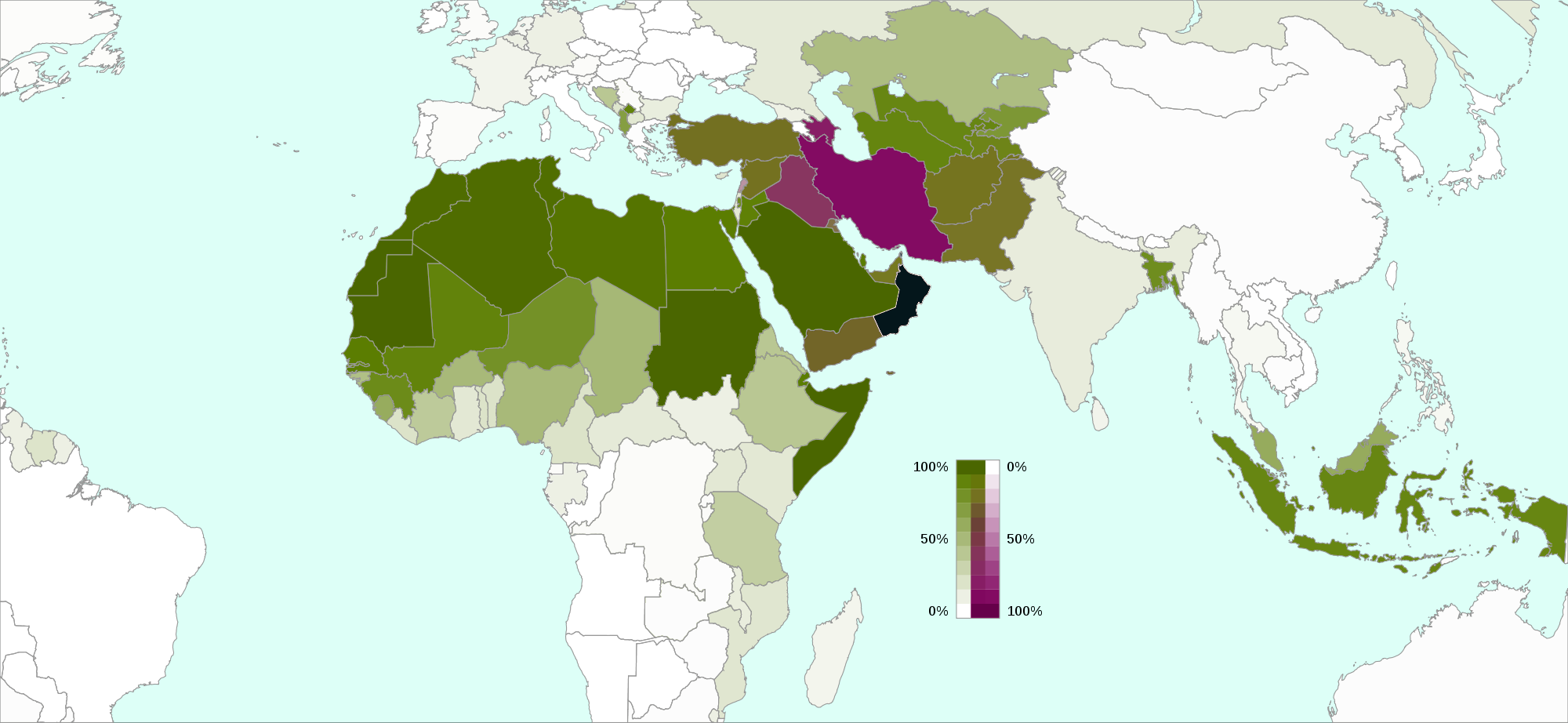
Countries by percentage of population practicing Islam. Sunni Shias Ibadi

Sunnis believe the companions of Muhammad to be reliable transmitters of Islam, since God and Muhammad accepted their integrity. Medieval sources even prohibit cursing or vilifying them. This belief is based upon prophetic traditions such as one narrated by Abdullah, son of Masud, in which Muhammad said: "The best of the people are my generation, then those who come after them, then those who come after them". Support for this view is also found in the Qur'an, according to Sunnis. Therefore, narratives of companions are also reliably taken into account for knowledge of the Islamic faith. Sunnis also believe that the companions were true believers since it was the companions who were given the task of compiling the Qur'an.

Sunni Islam does not have a formal hierarchy. Leaders are informal, and gain influence through study to become a scholar of Islamic law (sharia) or Islamic theology (Kalām). Both religious and political leadership are in principle open to all Muslims. According to the Islamic Center of Columbia, South Carolina, anyone with the intelligence and the will can become an Islamic scholar. During Midday Mosque services on Fridays, the congregation will choose a well-educated person to lead the service, known as a Khateeb (one who speaks).

A study conducted by the Pew Research Center in 2010 and released January 2011 found that there are 1.62 billion Muslims around the world, and it is estimated over 85–90% are Sunni.

=== Three group doctrines ===
There is no agreement among Muslim scholars as to which dogmatic tendencies are to be assigned to Sunni tradition. Since the early modern period, is the idea that a total of three groups belong to the Sunnis: 1. those named after Abu al-Hasan al-Ash'ari (died 935) Ash'arites, 2. those named after Abu Mansur al-Maturidi (died 941) named Maturidites and 3. a differently named third group, which is traditionalistic-oriented and rejects the rational discourse of Kalām advocated by the Maturidites and Ashʿarites. The Syrian scholar ʿAbd al-Baqi Ibn Faqih Fussa (died 1661) calls this third traditionalist group the Hanbalites. The late Ottoman thinker İsmail Hakkı İzmirli (died 1946), who agreed to dividing Sunnis into these three groups, called the traditionalist group Salafiyya, but also used Athariyya as an alternative term. For the Maturidiyya he gives Nasafīyya as a possible alternative name. Another used for the traditionalist-oriented group is "people of Hadith" (ahl al-ḥadīṯ). It is used, for example, in the final document of the Grozny Conference. Only those "people of the Hadith" are assigned to Sunnism who practice tafwīḍ, i.e. who refrain from interpreting the ambiguous statements of the Quran.

==== Ash'ari ====
Founded by Abu al-Hasan al-Ash'ari (873–935). This theological school of Aqeedah was embraced by many Muslim scholars and developed in parts of the Islamic world throughout history; al-Ghazali wrote on the creed discussing it and agreeing upon some of its principles.

Ash'ari theology stresses divine revelation over human reason. Contrary to the Mu'tazilites, they say that ethics cannot be derived from human reason, but that God's commands, as revealed in the Quran and the Sunnah (the practices of Muhammad and his companions as recorded in the traditions, or hadith), are the sole source of all morality and ethics.

Regarding the nature of God and the divine attributes, the Ash'ari rejected the Mu'tazili position that all Quranic references to God as having real attributes were metaphorical. The Ash'aris insisted that these attributes were as they "best befit His Majesty". The Arabic language is a wide language in which one word can have 15 different meanings, so the Ash'aris endeavor to find the meaning that best befits God and is not contradicted by the Quran. Therefore, when God states in the Quran, "He who does not resemble any of His creation", this clearly means that God cannot be attributed with body parts because He created body parts. Ash'aris tend to stress divine omnipotence over human free will and they believe that the Quran is eternal and uncreated.

==== Maturidi ====
Founded by Abu Mansur al-Maturidi (died 944), Maturidiyyah was the major tradition in Central Asia based on Hanafi-law. It is more influenced by Persian interpretations of Islam and less on the traditions established within Arabian culture. In contrast to the traditionalistic approach, Maturidism allows to reject hadiths based on reason alone. Nevertheless, revelation remains important to inform humans about that is beyond their intellectual limits, such as the concept of an afterlife. Ethics on the other hand, do not need prophecy or revelation, but can be understood by reason alone. One of the tribes, the Seljuk Turks, migrated to Turkey, where later the Ottoman Empire was established. Their preferred school of law achieved a new prominence throughout their whole empire although it continued to be followed almost exclusively by followers of the Hanafi school while followers of the Shafi and Maliki schools within the empire followed the Ash'ari and Athari schools of thought. Thus, wherever can be found Hanafi followers, there can be found the Maturidi creed.

==== Athari ====
Traditionalist or Athari theology is a movement of Islamic scholars who reject rationalistic Islamic theology (kalam) in favor of strict textualism in interpreting the Qur'an and sunnah. The name derives from "tradition" in its technical sense as translation of the Arabic word hadith. It is also sometimes referred to as athari as by several other names.

Adherents of traditionalist theology believe that the zahir (literal, apparent) meaning of the Qur'an and the hadith have sole authority in matters of belief and law; and that the use of rational disputation is forbidden even if it verifies the truth. They engage in a literal reading of the Qur'an, as opposed to one engaged in ta'wil (metaphorical interpretation). They do not attempt to conceptualize the meanings of the Qur'an rationally, and believe that their realities should be consigned to God alone (tafwid). In essence, the text of the Qur'an and Hadith is accepted without asking "how" or "Bi-la kaifa".

Traditionalist theology emerged among scholars of hadith who eventually coalesced into a movement called ahl al-hadith under the leadership of Ibn Hanbal. In matters of faith, they were pitted against Mu'tazilites and other theological currents, condemning many points of their doctrine as well as the rationalistic methods they used in defending them. In the 10th century AD al-Ash'ari and al-Maturidi found a middle ground between Mu'tazilite rationalism and Athari literalism, using the rationalistic methods championed by Mu'tazilites to defend most tenets of the traditionalist doctrine. Although the mainly Athari scholars who rejected this synthesis were in the minority, their emotive, narrative-based approach to faith remained influential among the urban masses in some areas, particularly in Abbasid Baghdad.

While Ash'arism and Maturidism are often called the Sunni "orthodoxy", traditionalist theology has thrived alongside it, laying rival claims to be the orthodox Sunni faith. In the modern era, Salafism represents a continuation and revival of the Athari school in Islamic theology, maintaining its commitment to the textualist interpretation of revelation and the rejection of speculative kalām, while adapting its discourse to contemporary religious and social contexts.

=== Narrow definition ===
There were also Muslim scholars who wanted to limit the Sunni term to the Ash'arites and Māturīdites alone. For example, Murtadā az-Zabīdī (died 1790) wrote in his commentary on al-Ghazalis "Iḥyāʾ ʿulūm ad-dīn": "When (sc. The term) ahl as-sunna wal jamaʿa is used, the Ashʿarites and Māturīdites are meant". This position was also taken over by the Egyptian Fatwa Office in July 2013. In Ottoman times, many efforts were made to establish a good harmony between the teachings of the Ashʿarīya and the Māturīdīya. Finally, there were also scholars who regarded the Ashʿarites alone as Sunnis. For example, the Moroccan Sufi Ahmad ibn ʿAdschiba (died 1809) stated in his commentary on Fatiha: "As far as the Sunnis are concerned, it is the Ashʿarites and those who follow in their correct belief".

Conversely, there were also scholars who excluded the Ashʿarites from Sunnism. The Andalusian scholar Ibn Hazm (died 1064) said that Abu l-Hasan al-Ashʿarī belonged to the Murji'a, namely those who were particularly far removed from the Sunnis in terms of faith. Twentieth-century Syrian-Albanian Athari Salafi theologian Muhammad Nasir al-Din al-Albani rejected extremism in excluding Ash'aris from Sunni Islam. He believed that despite that their fundamental differences from Atharis, not every Ash'ari is to be excluded from Ahl al-Sunna wal Jama'ah, unless they openly disapprove of the doctrines of the Salaf (mad'hab as-Salaf). According to Albani:

I do not share [the view of] some of the noble scholars of the past and present that we say about a group from the [many] Islamic groups that it is not from Ahlus-Sunnah due to its deviation in one issue or another ... as for whether the Ash’aris or the Maaturidis are from Ahlus-Sunnah wal-Jamaa’ah, I say that they are from Ahlus-Sunnah wal-Jamaa’ah in many things related to aqidah but in other aqidah issues they have deviated away from Ahlus-Sunnah wal-Jamaa’ah ... I don't hold that we should say that they are not from Ahlus-Sunnah wal-Jamaa’ah whatsoever

=== Sunnism in general and in a specific sense ===
The Hanbali scholar Ibn Taymiyyah (died 1328) distinguished in his work Minhāj as-sunna between Sunnis in the general sense (ahl as-unna al-ʿāmma) and Sunnis in the special sense (ahl as-sunna al-ḫāṣṣa). Sunnis in the general sense are all Muslims who recognize the caliphate of the three caliphs (Abū Bakr, ʿUmar ibn al-Khaṭṭāb and ʿUthmān ibn ʿAffān). In his opinion, this includes all Islamic groups except the Shiite Rafidites. Sunnis in the special sense are only the "people of the hadith" (ahl al-ḥadīṯ).

İsmail Hakkı İzmirli, who took over the distinction between a broader and narrower circle of Sunnis from Ibn Taimiya, said that Kullabiyya and the Ashʿarīyya are Sunnis in the general sense, while the Salafiyya represent Sunnis in the specific sense. About the Maturidiyya he only says that they are closer to the Salafiyya than the Ashʿariyya because they excel more in Fiqh than in Kalām. The Saudi scholar Muhammad Ibn al-ʿUthaimin (died 2001), who like Ibn Taimiya differentiated between Sunnis in general and special senses, also excluded the Asharites from the circle of Sunnis in the special sense and took the view that only the pious ancestors (as-salaf aṣ-ṣāliḥ) who have agreed on the Sunnah belonged to this circle.

=== Classification of the Muʿtazila ===
The Muʿtazilites are usually not regarded as Sunnis. Ibn Hazm, for example, contrasted them with the Sunnis as a separate group in his heresiographic work al-Faṣl fi-l-milal wa-l-ahwāʾ wa-n-niḥal. In many medieval texts from the Islamic East, the ahl as-sunna are also differentiated to the Muʿtazilites. In 2010 the Jordanian fatwa office ruled out in a fatwa that the Muʿtazilites, like the Kharijites, represent a doctrine that is contrary to Sunnism. Ibn Taymiyya argued that the Muʿtazilites belong to the Sunnis in the general sense because they recognize the caliphate of the first three caliphs.

=== Mysticism ===
There is broad agreement that the Sufis are also part of Sunnism. This view can already be found in the Shafi'ite scholar Abu Mansur al-Baghdadi (died 1037). In his heresiographical work al-Farq baina l-firaq he divided the Sunnis into eight different categories (aṣnāf) of people: 1. the theologians and Kalam Scholars, 2. the Fiqh scholars, 3. the traditional and Hadith scholars, 4. the Adab and language scholars, 5. the Koran – Scholars, 6. the Sufi ascetics (az-zuhhād aṣ-ṣūfīya), 7. those who perform the ribat and jihad against the enemies of Islam, 8. the general crowd. According to this classification, the Sufis are one of a total of eight groups within Sunnism, defined according to their religious specialization.

The Tunisian scholar Muhammad ibn al-Qāsim al-Bakkī (died 1510) also included the Sufis in Sunnism. He divided the Sunnis into the following three groups according to their knowledge (istiqrāʾ):

1. the people of Hadith (ahl al-ḥadīṯh): Their principles are based on the hearing-based evidence, namely the Book (Qur'an), the Sunnah and the Ijmāʿ (consensus).
2. The people of theory and the intellectual trade (ahl an-naẓar wa-ṣ-ṣināʿa al-fikrīya): They include the Ashʿarites and the Hanafis, the latter of whom consider Abū Mansūr al-Māturīdī as their master. They agree in the rational principles on all questions where there is no hearing-based evidence, in the hearing-based principles in everything that reason conceives as possible, and in the rational as well as the hearing-based principles in all other questions. They also agree on all dogmatic questions, except for the question of creation (takwīn) and the question of Taqlīd.
3. the people of feeling and revelation (ahl al-wiǧdān wa-l-kašf): These are the Sufis. Its principles correspond in the initial stage to the principles of the other two groups, but in the final stage they rely on revelation (kašf) and inspiration (ilhām).

Similarly, Murtadā az-Zabīdī stated elsewhere in his commentary on Ghazzali's Iḥyāʾ ʿulūm ad-dīn that the Sunnis consisted of four groups (firaq), namely the hadith scholars (muḥaddiṯhūn), the Sufis, the Ashʿarites and the Māturīdites.

Some ulema wanted to exclude the Sufis from Sunnism. The Yemeni scholar ʿAbbās ibn Mansūr as-Saksakī (died 1284) explained in his doxographic work al-Burhān fī maʿrifat ʿaqāʾid ahl al-adyān ("The evidence of knowledge of the beliefs of followers of different religions") about the Sufis: "They associate themselves with the Sunnis, but they do not belong to them, because they contradict them in their beliefs, actions and teachings". That is what distinguishes the Sufis from Sunnis according to as-Saksakī their orientation to the hidden inner meaning of the Qur'an and the Sunnah. In this, he said, they resemble the Bātinites. According to the final document of the Grozny Conference, only those Sufis are to be regarded as Sunnis who are "people of pure Sufism" (ahl at-taṣauwuf aṣ-ṣāfī) in the knowledge, ethics and purification of the interior, according to Method as practiced by al-Junaid Al- Baghdadi and the "Imams of Guidance" (aʾimma al-hudā) who followed his path.

In the 11th century, Sufism, which had previously been a less "codified" trend in Islamic piety, began to be "ordered and crystallized" into Tariqahs (orders) which have continued until the present day. All these orders were founded by a major Sunni Islamic saint, and some of the largest and most widespread included the Qadiriyya (after Abdul-Qadir Gilani [died 1166]), the Rifa'iyya (after Ahmed al-Rifa'i [died 1182]), the Chishtiyya (after Moinuddin Chishti [died 1236]), the Shadiliyya (after Abul Hasan ash-Shadhili [died 1258]), and the Naqshbandiyya (after Baha-ud-Din Naqshband Bukhari [died 1389]). Contrary to popular Orientalist depictions, neither the founders of these orders nor their followers considered themselves to be anything other than orthodox Sunni Muslims, Many of the most eminent defenders of Islamic orthodoxy, such as 'Abd al-Qadir Jilani, Al-Ghazali, Sultan Ṣalāḥ ad-Dīn Al-Ayyubi (Saladin) were connected with Sufism". The Salafi and Wahhabi strands of Sunnism do not accept many mystical practices associated with the contemporary Sufi orders.

== Jurisprudence ==
Interpreting Islamic law by deriving specific rulings – such as how to pray – is commonly known as Islamic jurisprudence. The schools of law all have their own particular tradition of interpreting this jurisprudence. As these schools represent clearly spelled out methodologies for interpreting Islamic law, there has been little change in the methodology with regard to each school. While conflict between the schools was often violent in the past, the four Sunni schools recognize each other's validity and they have interacted in legal debate over the centuries.

=== Schools ===
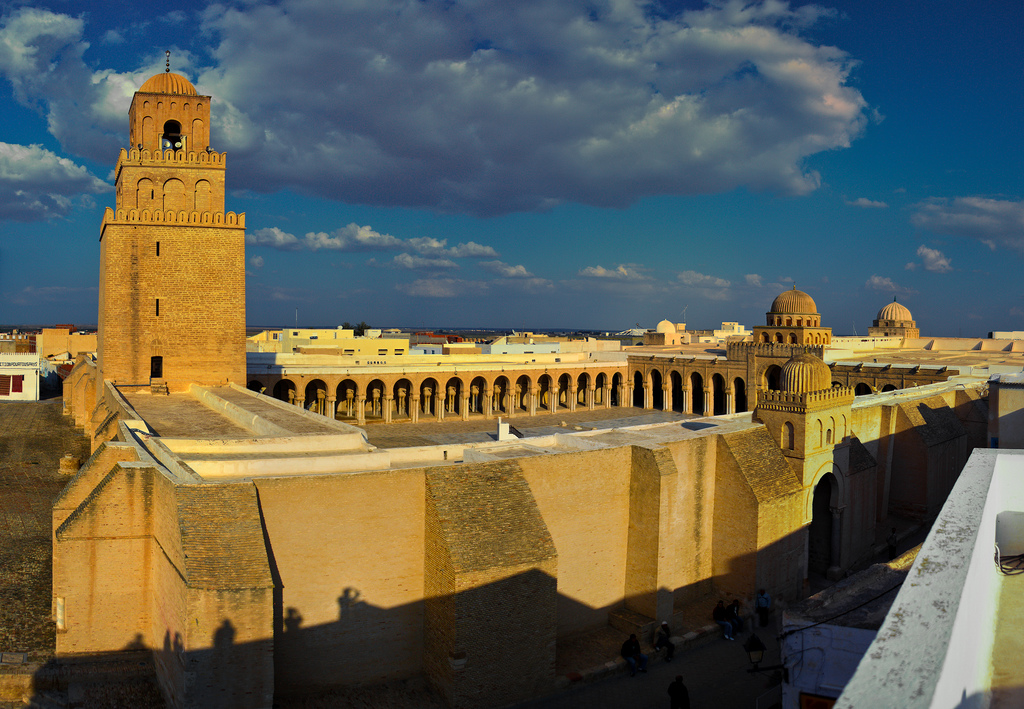
The Great Mosque of Kairouan (also known as the Mosque of Uqba) in the city of Kairouan, Tunisia, was, particularly from the 9th to 11th century, an important center of Islamic learning with an emphasis on the Maliki Madh'hab.

There are many intellectual traditions within the field of Shari'ah (Islamic law), often referred to as Madh'habs (legal schools). These varied traditions reflect differing viewpoints on some laws and obligations within Islamic law. While one school may see a certain act as a religious obligation, another may see the same act as optional. These schools are not regarded as sects; rather, they represent differing viewpoints on issues that are not considered the core of Islamic belief. Historians have differed regarding the exact delineation of the schools based on the underlying principles they follow.

Many traditional scholars saw Sunni Islam in two groups: Ahl al-Ra'y, or "people of reason", due to their emphasis on scholarly judgment and discourse; and Ahl al-Hadith, or "people of traditions", due to their emphasis on restricting juristic thought to only what is found in scripture. Ibn Khaldun defined the Sunni schools as three: the Hanafi school representing reason, the Ẓāhirīte school representing tradition, and a broader, middle school encompassing the Shafi'ite, Malikite and Hanbalite schools.

During the Middle Ages, the Mamluk Sultanate in Egypt delineated the acceptable Sunni schools as only Hanafi, Maliki, Shafi'i and Hanbali, excluding the Ẓāhirī school. The Ottoman Empire later reaffirmed the official status of four schools as a reaction to the Shiite character of their ideological and political archrival, the Persian Safavids. In the contemporary era, former Prime Minister of Sudan Al-Sadiq al-Mahdi, as well as the Amman Message issued by King Abdullah II of Jordan, recognize the Ẓāhirīs and keep the number of Sunni schools at five.

=== Barelvism ===
Barelvism is a Sunni revivalist movement following the Hanafi school of jurisprudence, and Maturidi school of theology with hundreds of millions of followers. The movement is moderate form of Islam that Muslims in South Asia have followed for centuries and it encompasses a variety of Sufi orders, including the Chistis, Qadiris, Suhrawardis and Naqshbandis as well as many other orders and sub-orders of Sufism. They consider themselves to be the continuation of Sunni Islamic orthodoxy before the rise of Salafism and Deobandi Movement. Barelvi movement is spread across the globe with millions of followers, thousands of mosques, institutions and organizations in India, Pakistan, Bangladesh, Afghanistan, Sri Lanka, United Kingdom, South Africa and other parts of Africa, Europe, the Caribbean, and the United States The movement now has over 200 million followers globally.

The movement claim to revive the Sunnah as embodied in the Qur’an and literature of traditions (Hadith), as the people had lapsed from the Prophetic traditions. Consequently, scholars took the duty of reminding Muslims go back to the 'ideal' way of Islam. The movement drew inspiration from the Sunni doctrines of Shah Abdur Rahim (1644–1719) founder of Madrasah-i Rahimiyah and one of the compiler of Fatawa-e-Alamgiri. Shah Abdur Rahim is father of Shah Waliullah Dehlawi. The movement also drew inspiration from Shah Abdul Aziz Muhaddith Dehlavi (1746 –1824) and Fazl-e-Haq Khairabadi (1796–1861) founder of the Khairabad School. Fazle Haq Khairabadi Islamic scholar and leader of 1857 rebellion issued fatwas against Wahabi Ismail Dehlvi for his doctrine of God's alleged ability to lie (Imkan-e-Kizb) from Delhi in 1825. Ismail is considered as an intellectual ancestor of Deobandis.

The movement emphasizes personal devotion to and oneness of God i.e. Tawheed and the finality of prophethood, adherence to Sharia and in Fiqh following the four schools, following the Ilm al-Kalam and Sufi practices such as veneration of saints among other things associated with Sufism. They are also called Sunni Sufis. The movement defines itself as the most authentic representative of what is known as Sunnī Islam and thus adopts the generic moniker, Ahl-i-Sunnat wa-al-Jamāʿat (The people who adhere to the Prophetic Tradition and preserve the unity of the community).

== Pillars of iman ==
The doctrines of the Sunnis are recorded in various creeds, which summarize the most important points in the form of a list in the manner of a catechism. The individual teaching points differ depending on the author's affiliation to a certain teaching tradition. The most important creeds that explicitly claim to represent the teachings of the Sunnis (ahl as-sunna wal-jama or similar) include:

- The text traced back to Ahmad ibn Hanbal, in which he defined "the characteristics of the believer of the Sunnis" (sifat al-Mu'min min ahl as-Sunna wa-l-jama). The text is handed down in two works in the work Ṭabaqāt al-Ḥanābila of the Hanbali Qadi Ibn Abi Yaʿla]] (died 1131). The first version comes from a treatise on the Sunnah by Ahmad ibn Hanbal's disciple Muhammad ibn Habib al-Andarani, the second is based on Ahmad's disciple Muhammad ibn Yunus al-Sarachhi.
- The two creeds of Abu l-Hasan al-Ashʿarī in his works Maqālāt al-islāmīyīn and Kitāb al-Ibāna ʿan uṣūl ad-diyāna. The former is called the teaching of ahl al-ḥadīṯ wa-s-sunna, the latter as the teachings of the ahl al-ḥaqq wa-s-sunna.
- The confession of the Egyptian Hanafi at-Tahāwī (died 933), also known under the title Bayān as-sunna wa-l-ǧamāʿa ("Presentation of Sunna and Community"). It has received frequent comments from the 13th century onward.
- The "Qadiritic Creed" (al-iʿtiqād al-Qādirī) mentioned in the world chronicle al-Muntaẓam by Ibn al-Jawzī and referring to the Abbasid caliph al-Qādir (died 1031) is returned. The caliph al-Qā'im is supposed to have read this text, which is shown at the end as the "Doctrine of the Sunnis" (qaul ahl as-sunna wal-jama), in the year 433 Hijra (= 1041/42 AD) which was read in front of a meeting of ascetics and scholars in the caliph's palace.
- The creed of al-Ghazālī (died 1111) in his second book of his religious encyclopedia Iḥyāʾ ʿulūm ad-dīn. It is headed "The Sunni Creed in the Two Phrases of the Shahāda" (ʿAqīdat ahl as-sunna fī kalimatai aš-šahāda) and deals first with the doctrine of God and then the other doctrinal points.
- The confession al-ʿAqīda al-Wāsiṭīya by Ibn Taimīya (1263–1328), which later received importance especially among the Wahhabis and the Ahl-i Hadīth. It was translated into French by Henri Laoust, by Merlin Swartz into English and by Clemens Wein into German.

Most of the mentioned branches testify to six principal articles of faith known as the six pillars of imān (Arabic for "faith"), which are believed to be essential. These six articles are common that present-day Sunnis agree on, from those who adhere to traditional Sunnism to those who adhere to latter-day movements. Additionally, classical Sunni Islam also outlined numerous other cardinal doctrines since the 8th century, such as the Creed of Tahāwi. Traditionally, these Sunni articles of faith have included the following:

1. Belief in the Oneness of God
2. Belief in the Angels of God
3. Belief in Holy Books
4. Belief in the Prophets of God
5. Belief in Resurrection after Death and the Day of Judgment
6. Belief in Preordainment (Qadar)

=== God ===
==== Unity ====
At the center of the Sunni creed is Tawhid, the belief in the oneness of God. God is a single (fard) God, besides whom there is no other deity. He is single (munfarid), has no partner (šarīk), no opposite (nidd), no counterpart (maṯīl) and no adversary (ḍidd). He has neither taken a companion nor children, neither conceived nor is he conceived.

God created everything, the years and times, day and night, light and darkness, the heavens and the earth, all kinds of creatures that are on it, the land and the sea, and everything living, dead and solid. Before he created all of this, he was completely alone, with nothing with him. In contrast to his creation, God has a timeless nature. He is beginningless (azalī) because he has existed for all eternity and nothing precedes him, and he is endless (abadī) because he continues to exist without interruption for all eternity. He is the first and the last, as it says in the Quran (Sura 57:3). God brought forth creation not because he needed it, but to demonstrate his power and as the implement his previous will and his primordial speech. God is creator, but has no needs. He does not need food, does not feel lonely and does not keep company with anyone.

==== Transcendence ====
To absolve God of all anthropomorphism, the Qur'anic statements that "God sat on the throne" (istawā ʿalā l-ʿarš; Surah 7:54; 20: 5) receive a lot of the Sunni creeds attention. The creed of al-Qādir emphasizes that God did not set himself up on the throne (ʿarš) "in the manner of the rest of the creatures" and that he created this throne, although he did not need it. Al-Ghazali's knowledge of the faith states that the "sitting down" is free from contact (mumāssa) with the throne. It is not the throne that carries God, but the throne and its bearers are carried through the grace of his power. According to al-Ashʿari, the Sunnis confess that God is on his throne, but without asking how. Even if God does not need the throne and what is below, because he spatially occupies everything, including what is above him, the throne and stool (kursī) are a reality.

==== Names and attributes ====
The Sunnis confess that the names of God cannot be said to be anything other than God, as Muʿtazilites and Kharijites claim. Rather, they teach that there are correlating attributes (ṣifāt) which exist in each of the names of God mentioned in the Quran: God is alive through life (ḥayāh), knowing through knowledge (ʿilm), mighty through power (ʿqudra), wanting through will (irāda), hearing through hearing (samʿ), seeing through sight (baṣar) and speaking through Speech (kalām). The attributes are not identical to God, nor are they anything different from him. Only those attributes are ascribed to God which he ascribed to himself (in the Quran) or which his prophet ascribed to him. And every attribute that he or his prophet has ascribed to him is a real attribute, not an attribute figuratively.

=== Angels and other spirits ===
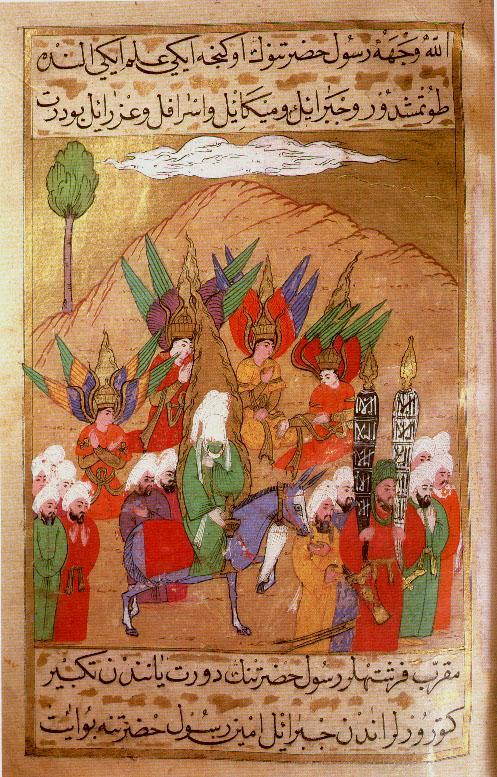
Muhammed accompanied by the archangels Gabriel, Michael, Israfil and Azrael. Turkish Siyer-i-Nebi-work, 1595

Sunnis believe in angels. God hid the angels from the vision of humans, thus they can usually not see them. Just in some special occusations God unveils them for individual humans. Like when the archangel Gabriel appeared to Muhammad one time in his true form with 600 wings, filling the entire horizon and another time when he was among the circles of the Sahaba, in the form of a white clothed traveller.

Angels fulfil duties assigned by God. The angel Gabriel has the mission to transmit God's revelations to chosen Prophets. The angel Michael is assigned over rain and plants. The angel Israfil must blow into the trumpet during thunder and the day of resurrection. Furthermore, to the angels belong the recording angels, who supervise humans and the angel of death, who takes the souls (lit. spirits) of the inhabitants of the world.

Unlike the Mutazilites and the Jahmites, the Sunnis believe that Satan whispers doubts to humans and hits them, as the Quran states. But humans, jinn, angels and devils are all created by the power of God and bound to his will. Even if humans, jinn, angels and devils aligned to move or stop one atom, they could not succeed without God's will.

=== Books of God ===
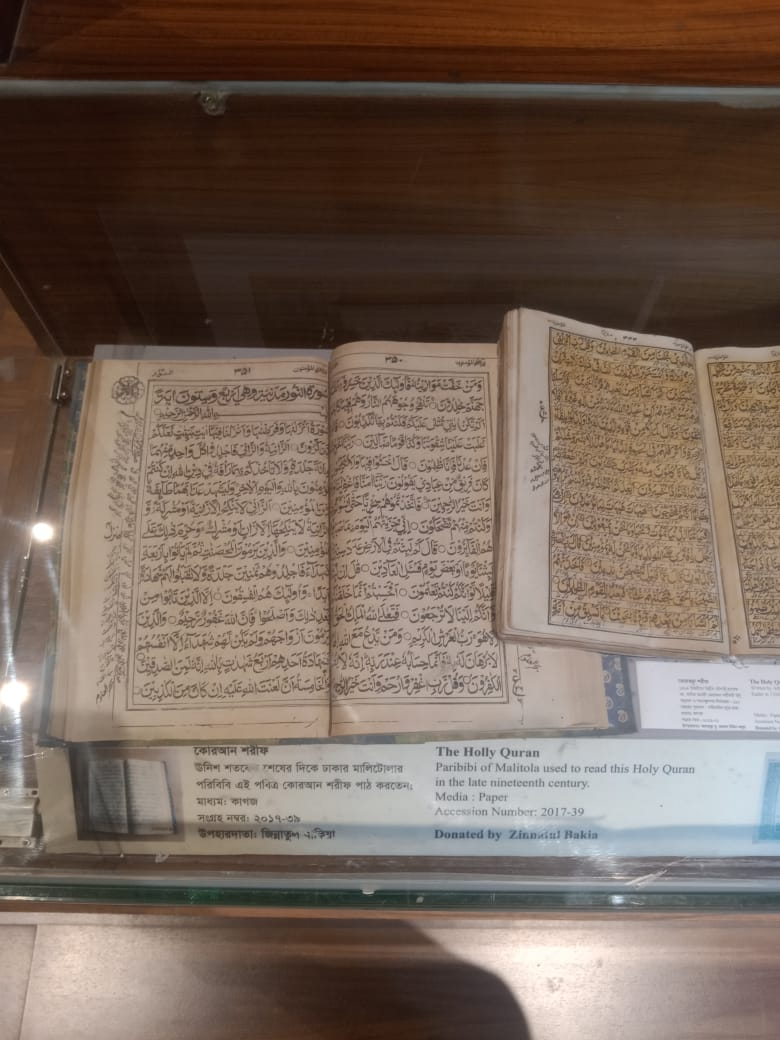
Historic Quran of Old Dhaka, Bangladesh

The Sunnis further believe in the books of God, sent to the envoys of God. To them belong the Quran, the Torah, the Gospel and the Psalms.

The Quran is according to Sunni views the speech of God. Who listens to it and regards it as human speech is according to Sunni Creed by at-Tahāwī an infidel. The Quran as the speech of God is sent down by the "trustworthy Spirit" (ar-rūḥ al-amīn; surah 26:193) and taught by Muhammad. God sent him down as inspiration (wahy) on his Messenger. The path of God's speech to the community of Muslims is a multi-stage process: God pronounced it, the angel Gabriel heard it and Mohammed repeated it, Mohammed repeated it to his companions, and the Ummah repeated them.

As the speech of God, the Quran is according to Sunnism uncreated. The teachings of the creation of the Quran is rejected by Sunnis. Anyone who takes this teaching is regarded as an unbeliever. The Quran is recited with the tongue, written into books and memorized by the heart, but remains the uncreated speech of God, because it is undividable and can not be split by the transmission from heart to paper. At-Tahāwī specifies that the Quran is not created like human speech. Rather, it came from God in an unexplained way as a word (qaul). Ibn Taymīya explains that the Quran originated from God and will return (sc. At the end of times) too.

=== Prophets ===
==== Messages ====
Confessing to the Prophets of God is also part of the Sunni faith. The first of the prophets is Adam. The original contract (mīṯāq) that God concluded with him and his descendants according to sura 7:172–173 is a reality according to Sunni belief. God has taken Abraham as a friend (ḫalīl) and talked to Moses directly. The last of the prophets is Mohammed from the tribe of the Quraish. The Sunnis do not differentiate between the messengers of God, (By rejecting some of them), but consider everything they have brought to be true.

God called the prophets and presented their truthfulness through obvious miracles. The prophets conveyed God's command and prohibition, his promise and threat, and it is incumbent on people to believe what they have brought to be true. God has given people the act of obedience (ṭāʿa) and opposition (maʿṣiya) forbidden. God's right to the acts of obedience is not only an obligation for people through the intellect (bi-muǧarrad al-ʿaql), but also through it for making it a duty through the oral transmission of his prophets.

==== Muhammad ====
Muhammad from the tribe of the Quraish is not only the seal of the prophets (ḫātam al-anbiyāʾ), rather, God placed him above all other prophets and made him Lord of men (saiyid al-bašar). He is God's chosen servant (ʿabd), Messenger, the Imam of the godly (imām al-atqiyāʾ) and the beloved of the Lord of the Worlds (ḥabīb rabb al-ʿālamīn). He is sent with truth (ḥaqq), guidance (hudā) and light (nūr). God has him with his message to Arabs and Non-Arabs as well as sent to the general public of the jinn and humans and with his Sharia, the earlier religious laws abrogated, except that which he has confirmed. Part of the Sunnis path is to follow the traditions (āṯār) of Muhammad internally and externally. They prefer his guidance to the guidance of anyone else.

Muhammad's prophethood is proven by miracles (muʿǧizāt) such as the splitting of the moon. The most obvious miracle is the Quran's inimitability. Every claim to prophethood after him is an error or imagination, since Muhammad is the last prophet. Another important point of teaching is the belief in Muhammad's Ascension (miʿrāǧ). Accordingly, Muhammad went on a nocturnal journey during which his person was transported to heaven while awake and from there to heights, "which God has chosen". God gave him what he had chosen for him and gave him his revelation. God has also blessed him in his life beyond and in this world.

=== Eschatology ===
==== In the grave ====
According to Sunni doctrine, people are questioned in their graves by Munkar and Nakir after death. Munkar and Nakīr are two terrifying, huge figures who let the person sit upright in his grave with mind and body and then tell him about the oneness of God and the prophethood of Muhammad. They ask him: "Who is your master? What is your religion? Who is your prophet?". They are the two inspectors of the grave and their questioning is the first test (fitna) of humans after death. The believer will answer to this test: "God is my Lord, Islam is my religion and Mohammed is my prophet". The doubter, on the other hand, will answer: "Oh dear, I don't know. I heard people say something, and that's how I said it". He is then hit with an iron club so that he utters a loud scream that can be heard by everyone except people and jinn. If people heard him, they would lose consciousness. Children are also interviewed by Munkar and Nakīr as well as people who have disappeared, drowned or were eaten by predatory animals. Deceased Muslims receive the supplication said for them, and the Sadaqa spoken in their name are a favor for them.

==== Sign of the hour ====
Another point of belief are the "signs of the hour" (ašrāṭ as-sāʿa) that precede the day of resurrection. This includes the emergence of the Dajjal, the rising of the sun in the west, the emergence of the Dabba from the earth and the excerpt from Gog and Magog. Jesus, the son of Mary, will descend from heaven and kill the Dajjal.

==== Day of resurrection ====
On the Day of the Resurrection the resurrection (baʿṯ) and the retribution of the deeds take place. First the bodies of all people, animals and jinn are put back together and revived. The souls are brought back into the body, the people rise from their graves, barefoot, naked and uncircumcised. The sun is approaching them and they are sweating.

A scales are set up to weigh people's deeds. The scales have two scales and one tongue and are as big as several layers of heaven and earth. The weights will have the weight of atoms and mustard seeds in order to realize the accuracy of God's righteousness. The leaves with good deeds (ḥasanāt) are thrown in a beautiful shape into the scales of light and weigh down the scales by the grace (faḍl) of God, the leaves with bad deeds (saiyiʾāt) are thrown into the scales of darkness in an ugly form and reduce the weight of the scales through the justice (ʿadl) of God.

==== The vision of God in the hereafter ====
The teachings of the Sunnis also include the vision of God (ruʾyat Allāh) in the hereafter, which has similarities with the visio beatifica in the Christian tradition. With this teaching the Sunnis set themselves apart from the Muʿtazilites, the Zaidiyyah and the philosophers who consider the vision of God intellectually impossible.

There are differing views among Sunni scholars about the timing and type of the divine vision. Al-Ashari states that God is seen on the day of resurrection, whereby only the believers see him, the unbelievers not because they are kept away from God. At-Tahāwī, on the other hand, was of the opinion that the vision of God was a reality for the inmates of Paradise. Ibn Taimīya doubles the vision of God: people see God while they are still in the places of the resurrection, and then after entering paradise.

As for the way of seeing God, al-Ash Aari and Ibn Taimiyah emphasized its visual characteristics. Al-Ashari meant that God can be seen with the eyes, just as one sees the moon on the night of the full moon. Ibn Taimīya adds that the vision of God is as one sees the sun on a cloudless day. In the ʿAqīda at-Tahāwīs, the transcendence of God is emphasized: the vision can neither be understood nor described, because none of the creatures are like God. According to al-Ghazālī's creed the pious in the hereafter see the essence of God without substance and accidents. According to the creed of an-Nasafī, God is seen neither in one place nor in any direction or distance. There is also no connection to rays.

==== Release of the monotheists from hell and intercession ====
According to the Ibn Taimīya's creed, the Umma of Muhammad is the first religious community to enter Paradise, Other religious communities also have the opportunity to get to paradise, because God leads whole peoples through the grace of his mercy (aqwām) out of hellfire. Ahmad ibn Hanbal and al-Ghazālī declare in their creeds that the monotheist en (al-muwaḥḥidūn) after being punished. Al-Ghazālī adds that through the grace (faḍl) of God no monotheist remains in hell for all eternity.

According to at-Tahāwī's creed, this only applies to the serious sinners from Muhammad's ummah: They are in hell, but not forever if they were monotheists at the time of death. What happens to them lies within God: if he wants, he forgives them through his grace (faḍl), and if he wants, he punishes them in his justice (ʿadl) and then brings them through His mercy (raḥma) and through the intercession of those who obey him out of hell and make them enter the Paradise Garden.

The intercession (šafāʿa) of the Messenger of God and its effect on those of his ummah who have committed serious sins is a fixed teaching point of the Sunni faith. Muhammad reserved the intercession especially for them. According to al-Ghazālī, the Sunni believer has a total of the intercession of the prophets, then the scholars, then the martyrs, then to believe the other believers in accordance with their dignity and their rank in God. Those of the believers who have no advocate will be brought out of hell by the grace of God.

=== The predestination ===
==== Extent of the predestination ====
According to Sunni doctrine, everything that happens happens through God's decision (qadāʾ) and predestination (Qadar) or his determination (taqdīr). Predestination includes the predestination of good and bad, sweet and bitter. God has that The measured (qadar) of creatures and determined their time of time. He makes his creatures sick and heals them, lets them die and makes them alive, while the creatures themselves have no power over it. God lets them die without fear and brings them to life without exertion. The one who dies dies on the appointed date, even if he is killed.

God has written the things predestined for the creatures on the well-kept tablet (al-lauḥ al-maḥfūẓ). The pen she wrote with is the first thing God created. God commanded him to write down what will be until the day of resurrection. The pen has already dried out and the scrolls are rolled up. Everything that was written on it in ancient times is immutable.

God is righteous in his judgments (aqḍiya), but his righteousness cannot be decided by analogy with the righteousness of people, because unjust actions for people are only conceivable with regard to someone else's property, but God does not encounter someone else's property anywhere so that he could behave unfairly to him. The principle of predestination is God's mystery with regard to his creatures. No archangel and no prophet is informed of this. Reflecting on predestination leads to destruction and is a step toward rebellion against God because He has hidden the knowledge about it from people.

==== The Blessed and the Damned ====
It is made easy for everyone for what they were created for. Blessed are whose who are saved by God's judgment (qaḍāʾ Allāh), condemned are those who are condemned by the judgment of God. God created paradise and hell above all else; then he created the people who are worthy of them. He has designated some out of generosity (faḍlan) for paradise, the others out of justice (ʿadlan) for hell. God has always known the number of those who go to paradise and the number of those who go to hell. This number is neither increased nor decreased. When God creates the body of the embryo, he sends an angel to him who writes down his livelihood (rizq), the hour he dies, his deeds and whether he is a damned (šaqī) or a blessed (saʿīd).

The Sunni does not doubt his belief. Humans neither know how they are registered by God (whether as believers or unbelievers), nor how it ends with them. God is also the converter of hearts (muqallib al-qulūb). Therefore, it is recommended to say the Istit̲h̲nā: "A believer, if God is willing" or "I hope that I am a Believer". Such a way of expression does not make people into doubters, because by that, they only mean that their otherworldly fate and their end are hidden from them. Sunnis do make claims about anyone's destiny in either paradise or hell, who prays to the direction of the Kaaba, no matter of their good deed or sins they committed.

== Sunni view of hadith ==
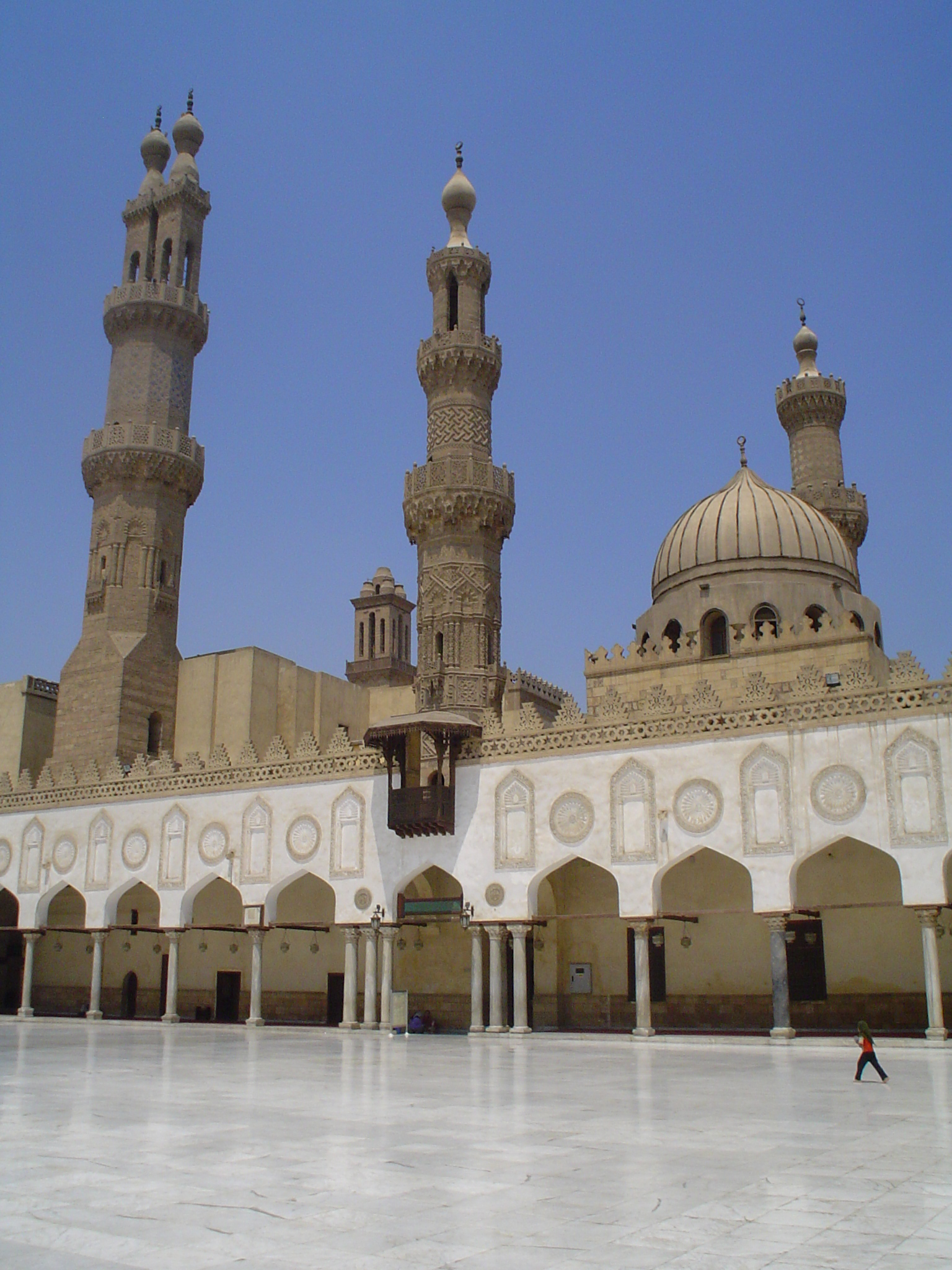
Al-Azhar Mosque in Cairo

The Quran as it exists today in book form was compiled by Muhammad's companions (Sahabah) within a handful of months of his death, and is accepted by all sects of Islam. Many matters of belief and daily life were not directly prescribed in the Quran, but were actions observed by Muhammad and the early Muslim community. Later generations sought out oral traditions regarding the early history of Islam, and the practices of Muhammad and his first followers, and wrote them down so that they might be preserved. These recorded oral traditions are called hadith. Muslim scholars have through the ages sifted through the hadith and evaluated the chain of narrations of each tradition, scrutinizing the trustworthiness of the narrators and judging the strength of each hadith accordingly.

=== Kutub al-Sittah ===
Kutub al-Sittah are six books containing collections of hadiths. Sunni Muslims accept the hadith collections of Bukhari and Muslim as the most authentic (sahih), and while accepting all hadiths verified as authentic, grant a slightly lesser status to the collections of other recorders. Four other hadith collections are also held in particular reverence by Sunni Muslims, making a total of six:

- Sahih al-Bukhari of Muhammad al-Bukhari
- Sahih Muslim of Muslim ibn al-Hajjaj
- Sunan al-Sughra of Al-Nasa'i
- Sunan Abu Dawud of Abu Dawood
- Jami' at-Tirmidhi of Al-Tirmidhi
- Sunan Ibn Majah of Ibn Majah

There are also other collections of hadith which also contain many authentic hadith and are frequently used by scholars and specialists. Examples of these collections include:

- Musannaf of Abd al-Razzaq of 'Abd ar-Razzaq as-San'ani
- Musnad of Ahmad ibn Hanbal
- Mustadrak of Al Haakim
- Muwatta of Imam Malik
- Sahih Ibn Hibbaan
- Sahih Ibn Khuzaymah of Ibn Khuzaymah
- Sunan al-Darimi of Al-Darimi

== Sunni state institutions ==
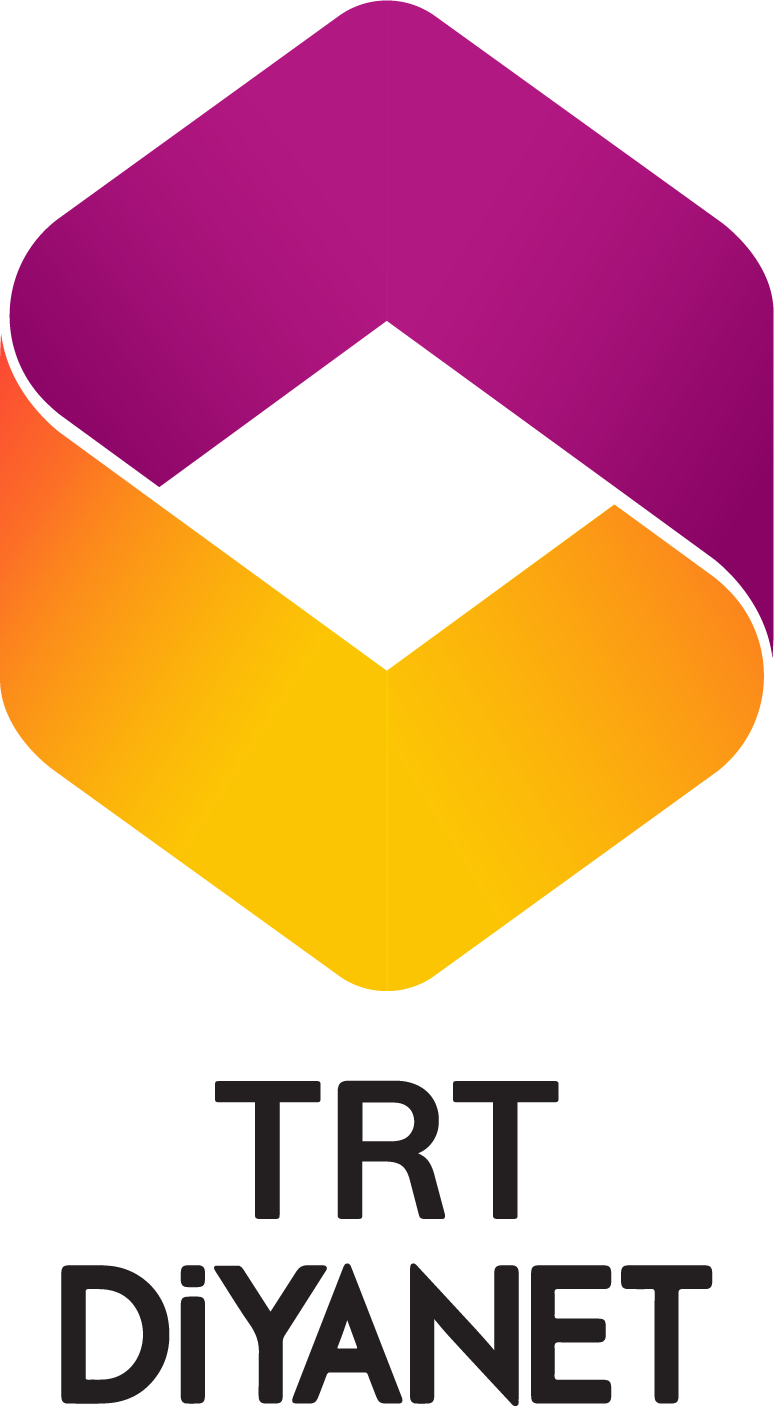
TRT Diyanet kurumsal logo

One of the most important teaching institutions of Sunni Islam worldwide is the Azhar in Egypt. Article 32b, paragraph 7 of the Egyptian Azhar Law of 1961 stipulates that the Azhar "follows the path of the Sunnis" (manhaǧ ahl as-sunna wa-l-jamāʿa), Umma has agreed to the foundations of the religion and applications of fiqh, with its four disciplines. Only those who stick to the paths of their science and behavior can become a "Member of the Council of Great Scholars" (haiʾat kibār al-ʿulamāʾ), among whom the Grand Imam of al-Azhar is elected. Zitouna University in Tunisia and University of al-Qarawiyyin in Morocco are recognized. They are also mentioned, along with the Azhar, in the final document of the Sunni Conference in Grozny.

Another body that claims to speak on behalf of Sunnism is the Council of Senior Religious Scholars founded in Saudi Arabia in 1971. In the past, the committee has expressed several times on fatwas about the Sunni-membership of certain Islamic groups within. In 1986 it published a fatwa excluding the Ahbāsh community from Sunnism. The Islamic World League in Mecca, also funded by Saudi Arabia, made a resolution from 1987 that it regards Sunnism as the pure teachings at the time of the Messenger and the rightful existence of the Caliphate. However, the Council of Senior Religious Scholars is largely under control of Wahhabi scholars.

The Turkish Directorate of Religious Affairs (Diyanet İşleri Başkanlığı), follows the religious policy of the Ottoman Empire, providing a Sunni interpretation of Islam. Plans by the National Unity Committee in the 1960s to convert the Diyanet authority into a non-denominational institution that also integrated the Alevis, failed because of resistance from conservative Sunni clergy inside and outside the Diyanet authority. Since the 1990s, the Diyanet authority has presented itself as an institution that stands above the denominations (mezhepler üstü) The religious education organized by the authority at the Turkish schools is based exclusively on the Sunni understanding of Islam.

== Self-image of the Sunnis ==
=== As the "saved sect" ===
A well-known hadith, which is to be interpreted as vaticinium ex eventu, says that the Muslim Umma will split into 73 sects, only one of which will be saved. The Sunnis have the idea that they are this "saved sect" (firqa nā niya). For example, Abu Mansur al-Baghdadi (died 1037) explains at the beginning of his heresiographical work al-Farq baina l-firaq ("The difference between the sects") that there are 20 Rafiditic, 20 Kharijite, 20 Qadaritic, 3 Murjiite, 3 Nadjāritic, 3 karramitic and furthermore Bakriyya, Dirariyyya and Jahmīya. These are the 72 erring sects. The 73rd sect that is the "saved sect" are the Sunnis (ahl as-sunna wa-l-jamaʿa). According to al-Baghdadi, they are composed of two groups, namely the followers of the Ra'y and the followers of the hadith. They agreed on the fundamentals of religion (uṣūl ad-dīn). There were only differences in the derivations (furūʿ) from the norms regarding the question of what permitted and what forbidden is. These differences are not so great that they considered each other to have strayed from the right path.

=== As center of Muslims ===
Later Sunni scholars also present the Sunnis as the center of Muslim community. The idea already appears to some extent in the Ashʿarite ʿAbd al-Qāhir al-Baghdādī, who emphasizes on several dogmatic questions that the Sunnis hold a position that lies in the middle between the positions of the other Islamic groups. An example is the question of predestination (Qadar), in which, according to the Kasb theory, you hold exactly the middle between the two extreme positions of the Jabriyya and the Qadariyya.

The Hanbali scholar Ibn Taymiyya (died 1328), who was otherwise known for his uncompromising attitude, also adhered to this view. He said that the Sunnis represented "the middle among the sects of the Umma" (al-wasaṭ fī firaq al-umma), just as the Islamic Umma is the middle between the other religious communities. He illustrates this with the following examples:

- When it comes to the attributes of God, the Sunnis stand in the middle between the Jahmiyya, who completely drains God of attributes, and the Muschabbiha, who make God similar to creation,
- in the works of God they stand in the middle between the Qadariyya and the Jabriyya,
- on the question of the threat from God (waʿid Allah) they stand in the middle between the Murdschi'a and the Waʿīdiyya, a subgroup of the Qadariyya,
- When it comes to the question of faith and religion, they stand in the middle between Haruiyya (= Kharijites) and Muʿtazila on the one hand and Murji'a and Jahmiyya on the other,
- and with regard to the Companions of the Prophets they are in the middle between Rafidites and Kharijites.

The Hanafi scholar ʿAlī al-Qārī (died 1606) continued this idea later. In his anti-Shiite pamphlet Šamm al-alawāriḍ fī ḏamm ar-rawāfiḍ he quotes a tradition according to which ʿAlī ibn Abī Tālib said: "Two kinds of people perish on me: the exaggerated lover and the exaggerated hater". He notes that the exaggerated lover is the Rafidites and the exaggerated hater is the Kharijit. The Sunni, on the other hand, loves ʿAlī in high esteem and is thus in the balanced middle (al-wasaṭ allaḏī huwa al-qisṭ). This relates al-Qari to the Qur'anic sura 2: 143, in which it is said that God made the Muslims a community standing in the middle (umma wasaṭ). Since the Sunnis stay away from the exaggeration described in the traditional ʿAlī saying, al-Qārī believes that they are also the actual "Party of ʿAlīs" (šīʿat ʿAlī).

=== As the essential bearers of Islamic science and culture ===
ʿAbd al-Qāhir al-Baghdādī portrays the Sunnis in his work al-Farq baina l-firaq as the actual bearers of Islamic science and culture. Of all the sciences, knowledge and efforts of which Muslims are proud, al-Baghdādī explains that the Sunnis have a major share. In the last chapter of his book, al-Baghdadi also relates this to building activity in Islamic countries. He believes that the Sunnis with their mosques, madrasas, palaces, factories and hospitals have achieved an unattainable position because none of the non-Sunnis have performed such services.

== Contemporary Ashʿarī – Salafī relations ==
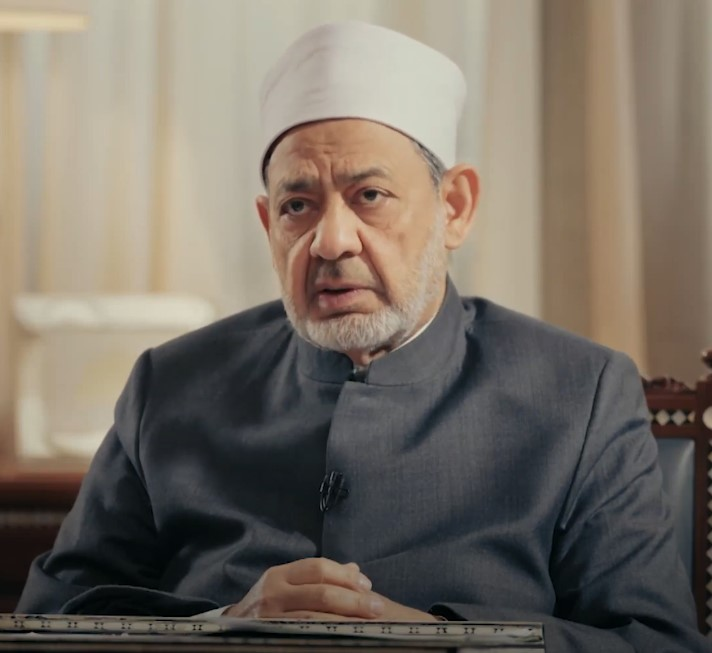
Ahmed el-Tayeb, Great-Imam of Azhar, was one of the most important participants of the Sunni-conference in Grozny, distanced himself from the declaration

Since the second half of the 20th century, there have been fierce clashes within the Sunni camps between Ashʿarites on the one hand and Salafiyya on the other, who exclude each other from Sunnism. In Indonesia, the Ashʿarite scholar Sirajuddin Abbas (died 1980) wrote several books in the 1960s in which he explicitly excluded the Ahl as-salaf from Sunnism. Among other things, he argued that there was no Salafi madhhab in the first 300 years of Islam. From this he deduced that those who called other Muslims to obey the Salafi madhhab, were promoting a madhhab which did not even exist. In his view, only the Ashʿarites were real Sunnis. Abbas' books served as the theological basis for anti-Salafist campaigns in Aceh in 2014. During these campaigns, various Salafist schools in Aceh were closed by the provincial government.

The Permanent Committee for Scholarly Research and Ifta in Saudi Arabia issued a fatwa in 1996 stating that Salafis are Sunnis. Like many Ashʿarites, the Salafis believe their teachings are the only true form of Sunnism, and hence reject the Asharites and Maturidites as part of Sunnism. An example is the Saudi scholar al-ʿUthaymīn, who in his 2001 published commentary on Aqīda Wāsiṭīya by Ibn Taimiyya expressed the opinion that Ash'arites and Māturīdites would not count among the Sunnis, because their doctrine of attributes would be in contrast to the doctrine of Muhammad and his companions. For this reason, the view that three groups belong to Sunnism should also be rejected. Sunnis are only those who are salaf in terms of belief.

The accusation by some Wahhabis that the Ashʿarites were not Sunnis was subject of a fatwa by the "Egyptian Fatwa Office" in July 2013. In its fatwa, the office rejected this accusation, affirming that the Ashʿarites still represented the "multitude of scholars" (jumhūr al-ʿulamāʾ), and stressed out that they were the ones who in the past rejected the arguments of the atheists (šubuhāt al-malāḥida). Anyone who declares them to be unbelieving or who doubts their orthodoxy should fear for their religion. On the same day, the fatwa office made clear in a fatwa that, according to their understanding, the Ahl as-Sunna wa-l-jama only refer to those Muslims who are Ashʿarites or Maturidites.

The rivalry between Ashʿarīyya and Salafiyya became visible again at the two Sunni conferences in 2016, which were directed against the terror of the IS organization. The first conference with the title "Who are the Ahl al-Sunna wa al-jama?" took place in the Chechen capital Grozny in August 2016 under the patronage of Ramzan Kadyrov. Numerous religious figures from Egypt, India, Syria, Yemen and the Russian Federation took part, including Ahmed el-Tayeb, the Grand Imam of the Azhar, and Sheikh Aboobacker Ahmed, the Grand Mufti of India. According to its organizers, the conference should "mark a blessed turning point in efforts to correct the serious and dangerous distortion of religion by those extremists trying to usurp the venerable name of Ahl al-Sunna wa-al-Jama'a, him to coin exclusively on itself and to exclude its true representatives from it". In the final declaration the Salafis and Islamist groups like Muslim Brotherhood, Hizb ut-Tahrir, etc. and the Takfiri organisations like ISIL were excluded from Sunni Islam.

In response to this, various prominent Salafiyya figures held a counter-conference in Kuwait in November 2016 under the title "The Correct Meaning of Sunnism" (al-Mafhūm aṣ-ṣaḥīḥ li-ahl as-sunna wa-l-jama), in which they also distanced themselves from extremist groups, but at the same time insisted that Salafiyya was not only part of Sunnism, but represented Sunnism itself. The conference was chaired by Ahmad ibn Murabit, Grand Mufti of Mauritania. A few days later, Grand Imam of Al-Azhar Ahmed el-Tayeb publicly distanced himself from the final declaration of the Grozny conference, reiterating that he had not participated in it and stressed that he naturally viewed the Salafists as Sunnis.

== See also ==
- Outline of Islam
- Glossary of Islam
- Index of Islam-related articles
- Islamic schools and branches
- King Abdullah Mosque
- International Islamic Unity Conference (Iran)
- Organisation of Islamic Cooperation
- Persecution of Muslims
- Shia view of the Quran
