= Jabriyya =

School of Islamic philosophical thought

Jabriyya (Arabic: جبرية, romanized: Jabriyyah rooted from j-b-r) was an Islamic theological group based on the belief that humans are controlled by predestination, without having choice or free will and that all actions are compelled by God.

== Etymology ==
The term Jabriyya comes from the verb ajbara, meaning to compel someone to act. Ibn Manzūr connects this idea of compulsion (ijbār) with predestination, defining the Jabriyya as those who hold that “God compels humans to carry out their actions.”

== History ==
Historically, the Jabriyya term was first used during the Umayyad Caliphate era in Basra. The first accused of this school was Al-Ja'd ibn Dirham (executed in 724). According to modern western historian Josef van Ess, the term of Jabriyya historically became a derogatory term used by different Islamic groups to denounce their opposing view; which technically its not an established school of thought. The Ash'ariyah used the term Jabriyya in the first place to describe the followers of Jahm ibn Safwan (executed in 746). The Ashʿarīs took a balanced theological position between the extremes of Jabriyya and Qadariyya. While Jabriyya denied human free will entirely, and Qadariyya affirmed full human autonomy, Ashʿarīs held that God creates all actions, but humans “acquire” them through intention and choice. This kasb doctrine allowed for divine omnipotence without denying human moral responsibility.

In Ashʿarī writings, it's often noted that the Muʿtazilīs whom they pejoratively label as “Qadariyya”—mock the Ashʿarīs by calling them “Jabriyya” in order to discredit their theological views. The Shi'ites used the term Jabriyya to describe Ash'ariyah and Hanbali. Abd al-Aziz al-Tarifi viewed the labelling of a Sunni as Jabriyya is characteristic of Qadariyya thoughts.

The theologian al-Shahrastānī distinguishes between two levels within the Jabriyya. The first group represents the true or extreme Jabriyya, who argue that humans possess no power whatsoever to initiate or produce actions—everything is entirely caused by God. The second group holds a less strict position, maintaining that while humans do have a form of capacity or ability, it does not play an effective role in producing actions; instead, it is God alone who brings the actions into existence.

== See also ==
- Qadariyah
- Determinism
- Hard determinism
- Soft determinism
