= Murji'ah =

Early Islamic sect withholding judgement of sinners or charges of disbelief

Murji'ah (Arabic: المرجئة, English: "Those Who Postpone"), also known as Murji'as or Murji'ites (singular Murji'), were an early Islamic denomination. The Murji'ah school of theology prioritized the importance of one's professed faith over the acts, deeds, or rituals they performed. They held the opinion that God alone has the right to judge whether a Muslim has become an apostate. Consequently, Muslims should practice postponement (ʾirjāʾ) of judgment on committers of major sins and not make charges of disbelief (’takfir’) or punish accordingly anyone who has professed Islam to be their faith. They also believed that good deeds or omission of them do not affect a person's faith, and a person who did no other act of obedience would not be punished in the afterlife as long as they held onto pure faith. They used to say that "disobedience does not harm faith as good deeds do not help with disbelief." This mode of thought emerged from a concern over Muslim unity as opposed to religious laxity and is often associated with Quran 9:106 ("There are others deferred until the command of God, whether He will punish them or whether He will forgive them").

== Origins and history ==
The emergence of the Murji'ah is not attributed to a single founding figure, but to the thought of a collection of figures, including Jahm ibn Safwan and others.

It is broadly agreed among historians that the Murji'ah group emerged in the aftermath of the Shiite revolt in Kufa by al-Mukhtar. Muslims, for the first time, had to confront intense political and theological disagreements and try to make sense of the fate of other Muslims who stood on other sides in political and sectarian conflict. The solution of the group that emerged as the Murji'ah was that only God ultimately knows who is correct, and so to God should judgement be deferred. Muslims themselves should not support or dissociate from other Muslim opponents in such conflicts. Early scholars of the Murji'ah themselves had a positive view of the first two caliphs (Abu Bakr and Umar), but suspended judgement on the third and fourth caliphs (Uthman and Ali). Regarding the latter, since the past was no longer available for evaluation, there was little other option but to suspend judgement (over committing to a negative view of them). At first, the Murji'ah worked on restoring peace among Muslim factions. Later, their attention shifted to combating the injustices being done to non-Arab converts to Islam. However, the Murji'ah (like the Sunnis in that era) still came to the belief that a legitimate ruler of the Islamic realm not only had to be Arab, but particularly, a descendant of the Quraysh tribe (from whom Muhammad originated).

The Murji'ah emerged as a theological school that was opposed to the Kharijites on questions related to early controversies regarding sin and definitions of what is a true Muslim. The Khawarij believed that committing a sin amounted to leaving Islam and the Murji'ah reacted with the opposite extreme, that deeds not only do not result in leaving Islam, but do not affect one's faith at all. An intermediate position was taken between the Murji'ah and the Kharijites by the Mu'tazilites, holding that an individual that commits a cardinal sin is not a believer, but is also not a disbeliever. Instead, they belong to an in-between position, which the Mu'tazilites referred to as the "intermediate position" (manzilah bayn al-manzilatayn). The first position attributed to have held this latter position was Wasil ibn Ata (a student of Hasan al-Basri) after being asked a question about the contrast between the Murji'ah and Kharijite positions.

According to the Ta'rikh of Al-Tabari, the Murji'ite position came to be associated with shirk, the ultimate Islamic sin of associating something with God. In 117/735, Nasr ibn Sayyar, soon to become the governor of Khorasan, accused the rebel leader Al-Harith ibn Surayj of shirk on the basis of his support for the doctrine of irjāʾ.

At some point, the Murji'ah sect ceased to exist. They stop appearing in biographical dictionaries after the mid-9th century onwards. According to Christopher Melchert, they may have been absorbed into the Mu'tazilite sect, as a number of entries on Mu'tazilite figures in 9th-century dictionaries comment that they were inclined towards 'postponement' (irjāʾ) and traditionalists in later periods would associate the two schools with each other (such as Abu Muhammad ibn abi Hamzah).

== Beliefs ==
=== Postponing judgement ===
As opposed to the Kharijites, Murjites advocated the idea of deferring judgment of other peoples' belief. The word Murjiah itself means "one who postpones" in Arabic. Murjite doctrine held that only God has the authority to judge who is a true Muslim and who is not, and that Muslims should consider all other Muslims as part of the community. This theology promoted tolerance of Umayyads and converts to Islam who appeared halfhearted in their obedience.

=== Faith versus deeds ===
Murjites considered genuine belief in and submission to God to be more important than acts of piety and good works. They believed Muslims committing major sins would remain Muslim and be eligible for paradise if they remained faithful. Therefore, they adopted moderate stances on issues such as fard and fasiq. Ibn Hazm described the Murji'ah position in the following terms:

A grave sinner (murtakib al-kabīrah) is a Believer with his belief intact. It is all the same if he has never done a single act of good and has never refrained from doing evil acts.

Conversely, those engaging in shirk cannot benefit salvation from performing good acts. Thus, faith is paramount.

The Murjite opinion on the issue of whether one committing a major sin remains a believer was adopted with modifications by the later theological schools – Maturidi, Ash'ari and Muʿtazila.

== Relationship to Abu Hanifa ==
Abu Hanifa (d. 767), the founder of the Hanafi school of Sunni jurisprudence, was often associated with the Murji'ah. In his al-Fiqh al-Akbar, he lay down the oldest surviving work regarding early Muslim creed, advocating respect for all the companions of Muhammad, withholding judgment regarding Uthman and Ali and predeterminism. His works were fundamental to later Sunni theology, Hanbalism being an exception. For the Murji'ah, Abu Hanifa is a central figure, especially for his advocation of the use of the application of reason in legal decision-making. Therefore, Murji'ites adopted Hanafi jurisprudence. A number of Abu Hanifa's followers have been associated with or called a Murji', including Nūḥ ibn Abī Maryam (d. 173/789–790) and Muhammad al-Shaybani.

== Influence ==
The subsequent Maturidi school of Islamic theology is believed by some to have emerged out of the Murji'ah.

== See also ==
- Al-Harith ibn Surayj
- Islamic theology
