= Jahmism =

Denomination of Islamic naturalist theology

Jahmism (Arabic: الجهمية, romanized: al-Jahmiyya), is an early Islamic denomination following the doctrines of Jahm bin Safwan (d. 128/746). The Jahmiyya particularly came to be remembered as advocates for the negation of God's divine attributes as part of God's essence (known as the doctrine of taʿṭīl) and have been described as a form of natural theology.

The Jahmites hold that God is utterly unique and the sole cause behind the created world. They denied the presence of essence within things and rejected theories of causation and propose that every moment is created by God anew, giving rise to the illusion of causation by association. The Jahmites were empiricists, and held the opinion that only the immediately perceived reality is real. Since the Jahmites reject eternity and reality of all of creation, the Jahmites also advocated that paradise and hell will eventually perish. Some doctrines of the Jahmites – such as God's transcendence and their insistence on the impermanence of creation – may be comparable to Buddhism.

Jahm and those associated with his creed are criticized for atheism by Hanbalites and Salafis.

== Main figures ==
The eponymous figure behind the Jahmiyya was Jahm ibn Safwan. Jahm was born in Samarkand. He lived and taught in northeastern Iran and it is possibly that he did not ever leave the region of Greater Khorasan. The second figure most commonly associated with the Jahmis was the Kufan Ḍirār ibn ʻAmr. However, despite his association with the Jahmiyya, he may have never met Jahm and even criticized him in one of his works. No writings from either authors have survived, and information about their views relies on short summaries produced by other authors, primarily their opponents.

Another famous preacher of Jahmi views was Bishr al-Marisi (d. 833), at the beginning of the 9th century, Jahmites acted in Nehavend, but some of them were forced to accept the teachings of the Asharites.

== Beliefs ==
The Jahmites are possibly the first Muslims who formulated a systematic theology. For the Jahmites, God is wholly other and incomparable, removed from every conceptualization or description by humans. Jahmi derives his doctrine from his epistemology: since all conceptualization are derived from the created world, there is no way to envision God. The lack of attributes to God brought him the accusation of denial of God. However, because everything what happens in this world – including what is done by living beings – are God's actions, Jahmite's concept of God is that of pervading everything, even though not mixed and the object of worship remains transcendent. Jahms did not deny that the attributes of God are real or a thing, but argues that God is not a thing.

The concept of God is tied to Jahmite's epistemology: The Jahmites were empiricists, upholding a form of natural theology. Furthermore, they rejected that there is any causation between different events. Instead, there is no causation only association. An example of this belief is illustrated by al-Jahiz: In his discussion about causation, he refers to a group of people those views are said to derive from the Jahmites. Accordingly, his opponents held that there is no quality within an object. For example, there is no fire within a flinch, but the fire is created. Likewise, there is no blood in a body, but blood is created when the body is opened and no water in the skin until touched. For the Jahmites, perceived reality is thus mind-dependent.

Jahm's rejection of God as a thing has been compared to the Neo-Platonic conception of God as "the One". However, Jahm's philosophy differs from Neo-Platonism in many major themes: According to Jahm's there are no incorporeal existences besides God. This also sets them apart from the Mu'tazilites. Furthermore, Jahm's epistemology is empiricistic not rationalistic. The created world is, for the Jahmites, ultimately unreal, as only God can be considered real. For the Neo-Platonists, the sub-lunar world is, even if a product by an incomprehensible God, not lacking reality.

Jahm's cosmology does not distinguish between essences and accidences, as Aristotelianism did, but distinguished between the corporeal bodies, and the incorporeal, that which is not a body. According to Jahm, only God is incorporeal, and that which is incorporeal and does not have a body is present everywhere and in everything, and that which corporeal and has a body is present in a single location and in its own body. According to Jahm, God, who is uncreated and necessarily exists, is the only incorporeal and immaterial cause. Furthermore, according to Jahm, composite incorporeal and immaterial things do not exist.

Since there is no essence and no self-existence in Jahmite's thought, except for God, the Jahmites also denied the eternity of paradise and hell. They cited the Quranic verses stating that "everything perishes but God's face" (Q 28:88) and that "God is the first and the last" (Q 57:3) in support of their view. They argued that verses proposing the eternity of the afterlife (Q 3:15) is hyperbolic.

Due to God's absoluteness, Jahmites adhere to predestination and reject the view that a person has free will and insist that actions are determined by God. The Jahmiyya believed this because they thought that human free will would entail a limitation on God's power, and so must be rejected.

== Criticism ==
The Jahmites have been accused of atheism, as their object of worship is an unknown entity. Al-Jahiz compares them to the Dahris (materialists), because the Jahmites would deny the afterlife, demons, jinn, angels, charms, and verdical dreams. In defense on the accusation that Jahmite's conceptualization of God as unknowable would constitute atheism, Jahm responded that the soul is likewise inaccessible yet present.

Sunni denominations rejected Jahmites as the extremist opposite to the anthropomorphists: The anthropomorphists, associated with the Hanbalites and Salafis, pose one end of the extremist position on God's nature, while the Jahmites represent the other extremist pole. Sunnis view themselves as the moderate stand among these two extremes.

Hanbalites and Salafis accuse Jahmites to found their principles on Hellenism, Christian heretics, or Jews. However, this claim is lacking substance as it is never formulated which doctrines are supposed to be taken from which source or informant.

Ibn al-Mubarak criticized the Jahmiyya rejection of free will in his poetry, and his anti-Jahmi poetry was cited by al-Bukhari. In particular, he argued that this rejection would imply that evil figures could not be blamed for the actions that they performed. Therefore, the actions of Pharaoh and Haman could not really be imputed onto them. Not only this, but their moral character and actions would have to be placed alongside figures such as Moses, since all of their actions have been predetermined.

== See also ==
- Jahm bin Safwan
- Mu'tazila
- Murji'ah
