= Jahm bin Safwan =

Islamic theologian (c.696–c.745 CE)

Theologian Jahm bin Safwan
- جَهْم بن صَفْوان

Personal life
- Born: c. 696 CE (76 AH) Samarkand, Umayyad Caliphate (modern-day Uzbekistan)
- Died: 745 CE (127 AH; aged 49-50) Merv, Abbasid Caliphate (modern-day Iran)
- Era: Late Umayyad – early Abbasid
- Region: Merv
- Main interests: Philosophy; Theology (Kalam)
- Notable idea: Founder of Jahmism · Founder of Jabriyya
- Occupation: Theologian; Philosopher

Religious life
- Religion: Islam (Jahmism)

Senior posting
- Influenced by: al-Ja'd ibn Dirham
- Influenced: Bishr al-Marisi; Dirar ibn ʻAmr

Jahm bin Safwan (Arabic: جَهْم بن صَفْوان, romanized: Jahm ibn Ṣafwān) was an Islamic theologian of the Umayyad period and whose name has given rise to the Jahmiyya moniker. During his lifetime, he attached himself to the rebel leader Al-Harith ibn Surayj, a dissident in Khurasan. He was executed in 745 by Salm ibn Ahwaz.

Reliable historical information about Jahm is sparse, coming from sources antagonistic towards him from later periods.

== Biography ==
Jahm was born in Samarkand, either of Persian ancestry or a non-Persian client of the Banu Raseb tribe but settled down in Khorasan specifically Merv. He learned under al-Ja'd ibn Dirham.

al-Ja'd ibn Dirham was a teacher of the last Umayyad caliph, Marwan II, and is described as a Dahri (Arabic: دهري, lit. 'atheist') and Zindiq (Arabic: زنديق, lit. 'heretic') for being the first person to state that God does not speak, hence the Qur'an is created. He was the first Muslim reported to have spoken about the createdness of the Qur'an and reject Abraham's friendship with God and Moses' speaking to Him. The name of Jahm bin Safwan would later be ascribed - possibly spuriously - to the theological movement known as Jahmism.

Jahm worked as the assistant to al-Harith ibn Surayj during the latter's revolt against the Umayyad governor Nasr ibn Sayyar. Jahm was killed during the first attempt to take Merv in 746, though the revolt greatly weakened Umayyad power and indirectly contributed to the success of the Abbasid Revolution.

== Teachings ==
Establishing the positive content of Jahm's doctrines is difficult, as they are reproduced (in an abbreviated form) only in later polemical works that are impossible to verify. However, it is said that he taught that only a few attributes can be predicated to God, such as creation, divine power and action, whilst others such as speech cannot. Therefore, he believed that it was wrong to talk about the eternal word of the Qur'an, since God (according to Jahm) is not a speaker in the first place.

Jahm was a proponent of extreme determinism, according to which a man acts only metaphorically in the same way in which the sun is said to set; according to Jahm, this is a linguistic convention rather than an accurate description, as it is actually God that makes the sun set.

== Legacy ==
Jahm's doctrines about God and the attributes of God were taken up in criticisms of the Mu'tazila, who were sometimes called Jahmites by their adversaries. The Mu'tazila believed that the Qur'an was created, a tenet which agreed with Jahm's recorded view.

Jahm left no writings, but many Muslim scholars wrote about his doctrines and a few modern scholars have written studies of him.

== Criticism ==
=== Contemporaries ===
Muqatil ibn Sulayman, an early commentator on the Qur'an, was a contemporary of Jahm who was particularly critical of him. Between the two men, a heated theological and political debate took place in the mosque of Merv regarding the divine attributes and two political figures with whom both men were affiliated. Each of them ended up writing a book refuting the other, and Muqatil used his political links to get Jahm expelled from Balkh, having him sent to Termez. However, Muqatil himself was condemned by some scholars of his time like Abu Hanifa and Makki ibn Ibrahim (the teacher of al-Bukhari).

Abu Hanifa (d. 150 H) was also reported to have harshly criticised Jahm. In one report, Abu Hanifa declared Jahm a disbeliever.

=== Later scholars ===
A theologian by the name of Uthman ibn Sa'id al-Darimi (d. 280 H) also wrote refutations of Jahm and wrote an extensive refutation of a prominent Jahmite by the name of Bishr al-Marisi wherein he declared him a disbeliever. In particular, the Sunni Hadith scholar and ascetic al-Hakim al-Tirmidhi (d. ~280 H) wrote a response to him.

Many hadith scholars wrote refutations of Jahm bin Safwan's doctrines, notably the Sunni Hadith scholar Ahmad ibn Hanbal (d. 241 H) and his students like al-Bukhari (d. 256 H) and Abu Dawud as-Sijistani (d. 275 H). Then, later Sunni theologians of 'Ilm al-Kalam continued to criticise him, in particular Abu Hasan al-Ash'ari (d. 324 H) and Abu Mansur al-Maturidi (d. 333 H), and he continued to be mentioned in later Ash'ari and Maturidi heresiology works.

== See also ==
- Muqatil ibn Sulayman
- Jahmism
- Jabriyya
