= Ibn Taymiyya =

Islamic scholar and jurist (1263–1328)

Imam Shaykh al-Islam Ibn Taymiyya
- ابن تيمية

Personal life
- Born: 22 January 1263 CE; 10 Rabi' al-Awwal 661 AH Harran, Mamluk Sultanate (modern-day Turkey)
- Died: 26 September 1328 CE (aged 65); 20 Dhu al-Qa'da 728 AH Damascus, Mamluk Sultanate (modern-day Syria)
- Era: High Middle Ages
- Notable works: Minhaj al-sunnah al-Nabawiyya; al-Aqida al-Wasitiyya; al-Sarim al-Maslul ala Shatim al-Rasul; ”al-Jawab al-Sahih”
- Education: Madrasa Dar al-Hadith al-Sukariyya

Religious life
- Religion: Islam
- Denomination: Sunni
- Jurisprudence: Hanbali
- Tariqa: Qadiri
- Creed: Athari

Muslim leader
- Influenced by: Ahmad ibn Hanbal; Ibn Hazm; Ibn Battah; Abd al-Qadir al-Jilani; Ibn Qudama; Ibn Aqil; Malik ibn Anas; al-Barbahari; Abd al-Ghani al-Maqdisi; Ibn Rushd; Ibn Karram
- Influenced: Ibn Qayyim al-Jawziyya; Ibn Rajab; Ibn Muflih; al-Dhahabi; Ibn Kathir; Muhammad ibn Abd al-Wahhab; Abdur-Rahman al-Mu'allimee al-Yamani; Sayyid Qutb; Yusuf al-Qaradawi; Abu al-A'la al-Mawdudi; later traditionists; later Hanbali school; Ahl-i Hadith movement; Salafi movement; Deobandi movement
- Arabic name
- Personal (Ism): Aḥmad أَحْمَد
- Patronymic (Nasab): Ibn ʿAbd al-Ḥalīm ibn ʿAbd al-Salām ibn ʿAbd Allāh ibn al-Khiḍr ibn Muḥammad ibn al-Khiḍr ibn Ibrāhīm ibn ʿAlī ibn ʿAbd Allāh ٱبْن عَبْد ٱلْحَلِيم بْن عَبْد ٱلسَّلَام بْن عَبْد ٱللَّٰه بْن ٱلْخِضْر بْن مُحَمَّد بْن ٱلْخِضْر بْن إِبْرَاهِيم بْن عَلِيّ بْن عَبْد ٱللَّٰه
- Teknonymic (Kunya): Abū al-ʿAbbās أَبُو ٱلْعَبَّاس
- Epithet (Laqab): Taqī al-Dīn تَقِيّ ٱلدِّين
- Toponymic (Nisba): Al-Numayrī al-Ḥarrānī ٱلنُّمَيْرِيّ ٱلْحَرَّانِيّ

Ibn Taymiyya (Note: Full name Taqī ad-Dīn Abū al-ʿAbbās Aḥmad ibn ʿAbd al-Ḥalīm ibn ʿAbd as-Salām ibn ʿAbd Allāh an-Numayrī al-Ḥarrānī (Arabic: تَقِيّ ٱلدِّين أَبُو ٱلْعَبَّاس أَحْمَد بْن عَبْد ٱلْحَلِيم بْن عَبْد ٱلسَّلَام بْن عَبْد ٱللَّٰه ٱلنُّمَيْرِيّ ٱلْحَرَّانِيّ); he is also known by the title Shaykh al-Islam (Arabic: شيخ الإسلام).) (Arabic: ٱبْن تَيْمِيَّة; 22 January 1263 – 26 September 1328) was a Sunni Muslim scholar, jurist, Mujtahid, traditionist, Qadiri Sufi, proto-Salafist theologian (Note: Sources describing Ibn Taymiyya as a proto-Salafi theologian: James Fromherz, Allen; Samin, Nadav (2021). Social, Economic and Political Studies of the Middle East and Asia. The Netherlands: Brill. p. 182. ISBN 978-90-04-43952-8. "The circle surrounding the paradigmatic proto-Salafi scholar Ibn Taymiyya and his influential disciple Ibn Qayyim al-Jawziyya (d. 751/1350) played a central role among them. Ibn Taymiyya's theology,.. passionately opposed and polemicized against the Murjiʾite views of other Sunnis, particularly Hanafis and the followers of Ashʿarite speculative theology (kalam)"; Medoff, Louis Abraham (2007). Ijtihad and Renewal in Qurʼanic Hermeneutics. Berkeley, California, USA: University of California. p. 33. "Ibn Taymiyah lives up to his reputation as a fiercely polemical proto-Salafi"; Wainscott, Ann Marie (2017). Bureaucratizing Islam: Morocco and the War on Terror. Liberty Plaza, New York, USA: Cambridge University Press. p. 85. ISBN 978-1-316-51049-0. "the medieval theologian and proto-Salafi Ibn Taymiyya was a critic of Ash'arism. He argued that the approach relied too heavily on philosophy. Instead, he advocated an approach that looked to the Salaf for guidance on correct beliefs."; Haynes, Jeffrey; Sheikh, Naveed S. (2022). "Making Sense of Salafism: Theological foundations, ideological iterations and political manifestations". The Routledge handbook of Religion, Politics and Ideology. New York, USA: Routledge: Taylor & Francis Group. p. 179. ISBN 978-0-367-41782-6. "What might be referred to as 'proto-Salafism', or creedal Salafism (al-salafiyya al iʿtiqādīyya), became emblematic in the scholarship of the fourteenth-century imam Taqi al-Din Ahmad Ibn 'Abd al-Halim al-Harrani") and iconoclast. Born in Harran in 1263 CE and fleeing from the Mongol invasion, he was taught by his grandfather and father in the principles of Islamic Jurisprudence at Damascus. Ibn Taymiyya proved to be a controversial figure among both his contemporaries and in later centuries. Syrian Salafi theologian Muhammad Rashid Rida, one of the major modern proponents of Ibn Taymiyya's works, designated him as the Mujaddid of the 7th Islamic century.

Clerics and state authorities accused Ibn Taymiyya and his disciples of anthropomorphism, which eventually led to the censoring of his works and subsequent incarceration.

Nevertheless, Ibn Taymiyyah has become influential among Sunni scholarly circles in recent times, and his creedal treatises are widely regarded by adherents of the contemporary Salafi movement as important classical scholarly references. Throughout his treatises, Ibn Taymiyya asserted there is no contradiction between reason and revelation, and denounced the usage of philosophy as a pre-requisite in seeking religious truth. He is also notable for his vigorous polemics against various schools of Kalam, particularly Ash'arism.

As a cleric who viewed Shiism as a source of corruption in Muslim societies, Ibn Taymiyya was also known for his anti-Shia polemics throughout treatises such as Minhaj al-Sunna, wherein he denounced the Imami Shia creed as heretical. He issued a ruling to wage jihad against the Shias of Kisrawan and personally fought in the Kisrawan campaigns himself, accusing Shias of acting as the fifth-columnists of the Frank Crusaders and Mongol Ilkhanids. He is also known for his diplomatic involvement with the Ilkhanid ruler Ghazan Khan at the Battle of Marj al-Saffar, which ended the Mongol invasions of the Levant. A legal jurist of the Hanbali school, Ibn Taymiyya's condemnation of numerous Sufi practices associated with saint veneration and visitation of tombs made him a controversial figure with many rulers and scholars of the time, which caused him to be imprisoned several times as a result.

Within recent history, Ibn Taymiyya has been widely regarded as a major scholarly influence in militant Islamist movements, such as Salafi jihadism. Major aspects of his teachings, had a profound influence on Muhammad ibn Abd al-Wahhab, the founder of the Wahhabism reform movement formed in the Arabian Peninsula, as well as other later Sunni scholars. Ibn Taymiyya's doctrinal positions, such as his takfir of the Mongol Ilkhanids and allowing jihad against other Muslims, were referenced by later Islamist political movements, including the Muslim Brotherhood, Hizb ut-Tahrir, al-Qaeda, and Islamic State, to justify social uprisings against the contemporary governments of the Muslim world. Although Ibn Taymiyya is frequently cited by followers of the Wahhabi movement in anti-Sufi polemics, portrayals of him as anti-Sufi are widely considered inaccurate, arising from selective and out-of-context interpretations of some of his writings. While he sometimes criticized certain practices associated with Sufism, he acknowledged that Sufism is an integral part of Islam and praised many Sufi masters; he himself was affiliated with the Qadiriyya order.

== Early years ==
Ibn Taymiyya was born on 10 Rabi' al-Awwal 661 AH (January 22, 1263 CE) in Harran, Mamluk Sultanate to a family of traditional Hanbali scholars. He had Arab and Kurdish lineages by way of his Arab father and Kurdish mother. His father, Shihab al-Din Abd al-Halim ibn Taymiyya, held the Hanbali chair in Harran and later at the Umayyad Mosque. At the time, Harran was a part of the Mamluk Sultanate, near what is today the border of Syria and Turkey, currently in the Şanlıurfa Province. At the beginning of the Islamic period, Harran was located in Diyar Mudar, the land of the Mudar tribe. Before its destruction by the Mongols, Harran was also well-known since the early days of Islam for its tradition of adhering to the Hanbali school, to which Ibn Taymiyya's family belonged. His grandfather, Majd al-Din ibn Taymiyya, and his uncle, Fakhr al-Din, were both reputable scholars of the Hanbali school, and their scholarly achievements well-known.

== Education ==
In 1269, Ibn Taymiyya, aged seven, left Harran together with his father and three brothers; however, the city was completely destroyed by the ensuing Mongol invasion. Ibn Taymiyya's family moved and settled in Damascus, Syria, which was ruled by the Mamluk Sultanate at the time.

In Damascus, his father served as the director of the Sukkariyya Madrasa, a place where Ibn Taymiyya also received his early education. He acquainted himself with the religious and secular sciences of his time. His religious studies began in his early teens when he committed the entire Quran to memory, and later came to learn the disciplines of the Quran. From his father, he learnt the religious science of jurisprudence and its principles. Ibn Taymiyya studied the works of Ahmad ibn Hanbal, Abu Bakr al-Khallal, and Ibn Qudama, as well as the works of his own grandfather, Majd al-Din. His study of jurisprudence was not limited to the Hanbali tradition, as he also studied the other schools of jurisprudence.

The number of scholars under which he studied hadith is said to number more than two-hundred, four of whom were women. Those who are known by name amount to forty hadith teachers, as recorded by Ibn Taymiyya in his work titled Arba'un Haditha. Serajul Haque says, based on this, Ibn Taymiyya started to hear hadith from the age of five. One of Ibn Taymiyya's teachers was the first Hanbali Chief Justice of Syria, Shams al-Din al-Maqdisi, who held the newly created position instituted by Baibars as part of a reform of the judiciary. Al-Maqdisi later came to give Ibn Taymiyya permission to issue legal verdicts, making him a judge at the age of seventeen.

Ibn Taymiyya's secular studies led him to devote attention to the Arabic language and literature by studying Arabic grammar and lexicography under Ali ibn Abd al-Qawi al-Tufi. He went on to master the famous book of Arabic grammar al-Kitab, written by the grammarian Sibawayhi. He also studied mathematics, algebra, calligraphy, speculative theology, philosophy, history, and heresiography. With the knowledge he gained from history and philosophy, he set to refute the prevalent philosophical discourses of his time, one of which was Aristotelianism. Ibn Taymiyya also learnt about Sufism and stated he had reflected on the works of Sahl al-Tustari, al-Junayd al-Baghdadi, Abu Talib al-Makki, Abd al-Qadir al-Jilani, Shihab al-Din Umar al-Suhrawardi, and Ibn Arabi. In 1282, Ibn Taymiyya completed his education at the age of 20.

== Life as a scholar ==
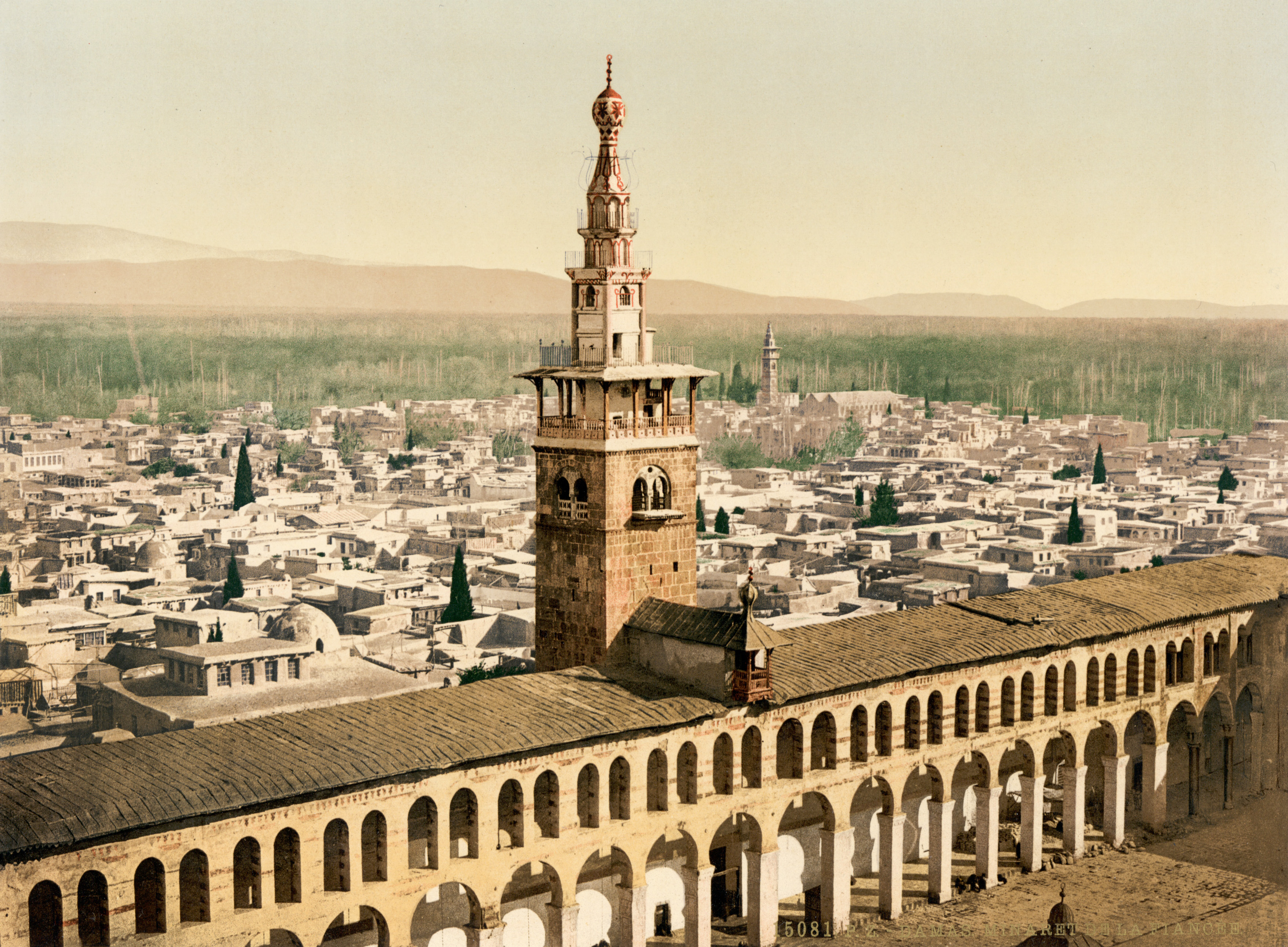
The Umayyad Mosque pictured in 1895, where Ibn Taymiyya used to give lessons.

After his father died in 1284, he took up the then vacant post as the head of the Sukkariyya madrasa and began giving lessons on Hadith. A year later he started giving lessons, as chair of the Hanbali Zawiya on Fridays at the Umayyad Mosque, on the subject of tafsir (exegesis of Qur'an). In November 1292, Ibn Taymiyya performed the Hajj and after returning 4 months later, he wrote his first book aged twenty nine called Manasik al-Hajj (Rites of the Pilgrimage), in which he criticized and condemned the religious innovations he saw take place there. Ibn Taymiyya represented the Hanbali school of thought during this time. The Hanbali school was seen as the most traditional school out of the four legal systems (Hanafi, Maliki and Shafi'i) because it was "suspicious of the Hellenist disciplines of philosophy and speculative theology." He remained faithful throughout his life to this school, whose doctrines he had mastered, but he nevertheless called for ijtihad (independent reasoning by one who is qualified) and discouraged taqlid.

Ibn Taymiyya had a simple life, most of which he dedicated to learning, writing, and teaching. He never married nor did he have a female companion throughout his years. Professor Al-Matroudi stated that this may be why he was able to engage fully with the political affairs of his time without holding any official position such as that of a qadi. An offer of an official position was made to him but he never accepted.

=== Possible influences ===
Ibn Taymiyya was taught by scholars who were renowned in their time; however, there is no evidence any of them had a significant influence on him.

A strong influence on Ibn Taymiyya was the founder of the Hanbali school itself, Ahmad ibn Hanbal. Ibn Taymiyya was trained in his school by studying Ahmad's Musnad in great detail, having studied it multiple times. Though he spent much of his life following this school, he renounced blind-following near the end of his life.

His work was most influenced by the sayings and actions of the first three generations of Muslims (salaf), which is displayed in his works where he would give preference to their opinions over those of his contemporaries. The modern Salafi movement derives its name from these generations.

=== Relationship with the authorities ===
Ibn Taymiyya's own relationship, as a religious scholar, with the ruling apparatus was not always amicable. It ranged from silence to open rebellion. On occasions when he shared the same views and aims as the ruling authorities his contributions were welcomed, but when Ibn Taymiyya went against the status quo, he was seen as "uncooperative", and on occasions spent much time in prison. Ibn Taymiyya's attitude towards his own rulers was based on the actions of Muhammad's companions when they made an oath of allegiance to him as follows; "to obey within obedience to God, even if the one giving the order is unjust; to abstain from disputing the authority of those who exert it; and to speak out the truth, or take up its cause without fear in respect of God, of blame from anyone."

Ibn Taymiyya was a religious scholar as well as an Islamic political activist. In his efforts he was persecuted and imprisoned on six occasions with the total time spent inside prison coming to over six years. Other sources say that he spent over twelve years in prison. His detentions were due to the pushback from the clerical establishment of the Mamluk Sultanate, who opposed certain elements of his creed and his views on some jurisprudential issues. However, according to Yahya Michot, "the real reasons were more trivial". Michot stated five reasons as to why Ibn Taymiyya was imprisoned by the Mamluk government, they being: not complying with the "doctrines and practices prevalent among powerful religious and Sufi establishments, an overly outspoken personality, the jealousy of his peers, the risk to public order due to this popular appeal and political intrigues." Baber Johansen stated that the reasons for Ibn Taymiyya's incarcerations were, "as a result of his conflicts with Muslim mystics, jurists, and theologians, who were able to persuade the political authorities of the necessity to limit Ibn Taymiyya's range of action through political censorship and incarceration."

Ibn Taymiyya's emergence in the public and political spheres began in 1293 when he was 30 years old, when the authorities asked him to issue a fatwa (legal verdict) on Assaf al-Nasrani, a Christian cleric who was accused of insulting Muhammad. He accepted the invitation and delivered his fatwa, calling for the man to receive the death penalty. Despite the fact that public opinion was very much on Ibn Taymiyya's side, the Governor of Syria attempted to resolve the situation by asking Assaf to accept Islam in return for his life, to which he agreed. This resolution was not acceptable to Ibn Taymiyya who then, together with his followers, protested against it outside the governor's palace, demanding that Assaf be put to death, on the grounds that any person—Muslim or non-Muslim—who insults Muhammad must be killed. His unwillingness to compromise, coupled with his attempt to protest against the governor's actions, resulted in him being punished with a prison sentence, the first of many such imprisonments which were to come. The French orientalist Henri Laoust says that during his incarceration, Ibn Taymiyya "wrote his first great work, al-Ṣārim al-maslūl ʿalā shātim al-Rasūl (The Drawn Sword against those who insult the Messenger)." Ibn Taymiyya, together with the help of his disciples, continued with his efforts against what, "he perceived to be un-Islamic practices" and to implement what he saw as his religious duty of commanding good and forbidding wrong. Yahya Michot says that some of these incidences included: "shaving children's heads", leading "an anti-debauchery campaign in brothels and taverns", hitting an atheist before his public execution, destroying what was thought to be a sacred rock in a mosque, attacking astrologers and obliging "deviant Sufi Shaykhs to make public acts of contrition and adhere to the Sunnah." Ibn Taymiyya and his disciples used to condemn wine sellers and they would attack wine shops in Damascus by breaking wine bottles and pouring them onto the floor.

A few years later in 1296, he took over the position of one of his teachers (Zayn al-Din Ibn al-Munadjdjaal), taking the post of professor of Hanbali jurisprudence at the Hanbaliyya madrasa, the oldest such institution of this tradition in Damascus. This is seen by some to be the peak of his scholarly career. The year when he began his post at the Hanbaliyya madrasa, was a time of political turmoil. The Mamluk sultan Al-Adil Kitbugha was deposed by his vice-sultan Al-Malik al-Mansur Lajin who then ruled from 1297 to 1299. Lajin desired to commission an expedition against the Christians of the Armenian Kingdom of Cilicia who formed an alliance with the Mongol Empire and participated in the military campaign which lead to the destruction of Baghdad, the capital of the Abbasid Caliphate, and the destruction of Harran, the birthplace of Ibn Taymiyya, for that purpose, he urged Ibn Taymiyya to call the Muslims to Jihad.

In 1298, Ibn Taymiyya wrote his explanation for the ayat al-mutashabihat (the unclear verses of the Qur'an) titled Al-`Aqidat al-Hamawiyat al-Kubra (The creed of the great people of Hama). The book is about divine attributes and it served as an answer to a question from the city of Hama, Syria. At that particular time Ash'arites held prominent positions within the Islamic scholarly community in both Syria and Egypt, and they held a certain position on the divine attributes of God. Ibn Taymiyya in his book strongly disagreed with their views and this heavy opposition to the common Ash'ari position, caused considerable controversy.

Once more, Ibn Taymiyya collaborated with the Mamluks in 1300, when he joined the punitive expedition against the Alawites and Shiites, in the Kasrawan region of the Lebanese mountains. Ibn Taymiyya believed that the Alawites were "more heretical than Jews and Christians", and according to Carole Hillenbrand, the confrontation with the Alawites occurred because they "were accused of collaborating with Christians and Mongols." Ibn Taymiyya had further active involvements in campaigns against the Mongols and their alleged Alawite allies.

In 1305, Ibn Taymiyya took part in a second military offensive against the Alawites and the Isma`ilis in the Kasrawan region of the Lebanese mountains where they were defeated. The majority of the Alawis and Ismailis eventually converted to Twelver Shiism and settled in south Lebanon and the Bekaa valley, with a few Shia pockets that survived in the Lebanese mountains.

== Involvement in the Mongol invasions ==
=== First invasion ===
The first invasion took place between December 1299 and April 1300 due to the military campaign by the Mamluks against the Armenian Kingdom of Cilicia who were allied with the Mongols. Due to the Mongol legal system that neglected sharia and implemented Yassa; Ibn Taymiyya had declared Takfir upon the Ilkhanid regime and its armies for ruling by man-made laws and believing in them, despite these laws being rarely enforced in Muslim majority regions in an extensive manner. Openly rejecting Ghazan Khan's claim to "pādishāh al-islām" (King of Islam), a title which Ghazan took to legitimise his military campaigns, Ibn Taymiyya denounced him as an "infidel king" and issued numerous fatwas condemning the political order of the Tatars. The Ilkhanate army managed to defeat the Mamluk Sultanate in The Third Battle of Homs and reach Damascus by the end of December 1299. Fearful of Mongol atrocities, many scholars, intellectuals and officers began to flee Damascus in panic. Ibn Taymiyya was one of those clerics who stood firm alongside the vulnerable Damascus citizens and called for an uncompromising and heroic resistance to the Tatar invaders. Ibn Taymiyya drew parallels of their crisis with the Riddah wars (Apostate wars) fought by the first Muslim Caliph, Abu Bakr, against the renegade Arabian tribes that abandoned sharia. Ibn Taymiyya severely rebuked those Muslims escaping in the face of Mongol onslaught and compared their state to the withdrawal of Muslims in the Battle of Uhud. In a passionate letter to the commander of the Damascene Citadel, Ibn Taymiyya appealed:

"Until there stands even a single rock, do everything in your power to not surrender the castle. There is great benefit for the people of Syria. Allah declared it a sanctuary for the people of Shām—where it will remain a land of faith and sunna until the descent of the Prophet Jesus."

Despite political pressure, Ibn Taymiyya's directives were heeded by the Mamluk officer and Mongol negotiations to surrender the Citadel stalled. Shortly after, Ibn Taymiyya and a number of his acolytes and pupils took part in a counter-offensive targeting various Shia tribes allied to the Mongols in the peripheral regions of the city; thereby repelling the Mongol attack. Ibn Taymiyya went with a delegation of Islamic scholars to talk to Ghazan Khan, who was the Khan of the Mongol Ilkhanate of Iran, to plead clemency. By early January 1300, the Mongol allies, the Armenians and Georgians, had caused widespread damage to Damascus and they had taken Syrian prisoners. The Mongols effectively occupied Damascus for the first four months of 1303. Most of the military had fled the city, including most of the civilians. Ibn Taymiyya however, stayed and was one of the leaders of the resistance inside Damascus and he went to speak directly to the Ilkhan, Mahmud Ghazan, and his vizier Rashid al-Din Tabib. He sought the release of Muslim and dhimmi prisoners which the Mongols had taken in Syria, and after negotiation, secured their release.

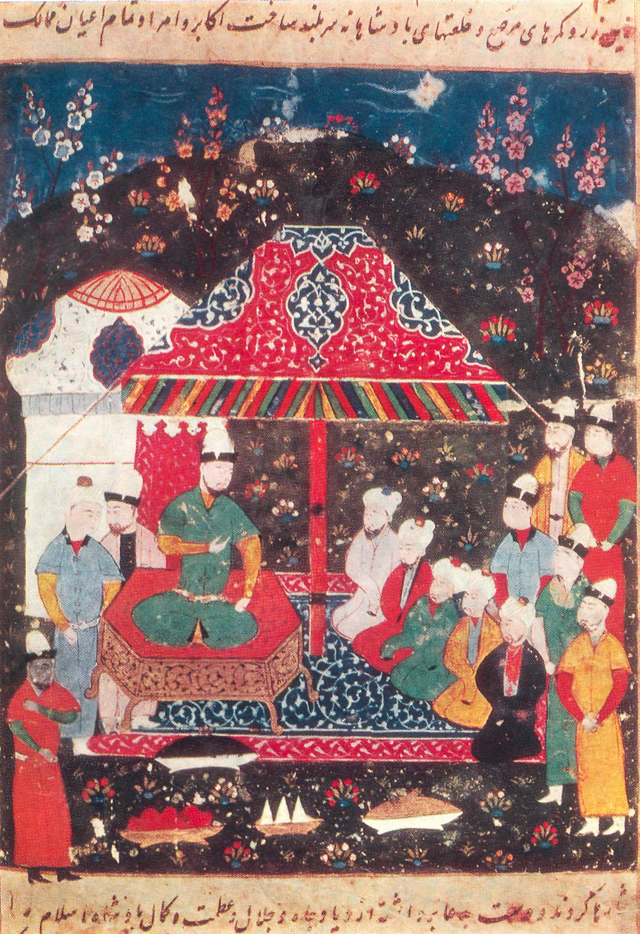
An artist illustrated of Ghazan Khan, a historical figure harshly rebuked by Ibn Taymiyya, mainly due to his constant state of hostility towards the Mamluks of Egypt.

=== Second invasion ===
The second invasion lasted between October 1300 and January 1301. Ibn Taymiyya at this time began giving sermons on jihad at the Umayyad mosque. As the civilians began to flee in panic; Ibn Taymiyya pronounced fatwas declaring the religious duty upon Muslims to fight the Mongol armies to death, inflict a massive defeat and expel them from Syria in its entirety. Ibn Taymiyya also spoke to and encouraged the Governor of Damascus, al-Afram, to achieve victory over the Mongols. He became involved with al-Afram once more, when he was sent to get reinforcements from Cairo. Narrating Ibn Taymiyya's fierce stance on fighting the Mongols, Ibn Kathir reports:

even if you see me on their side with a Qurʾan on my side, kill them immediately!

— Ibn Taymiyya, in Ismail Ibn Kathir, al-Bidāya wa-l-Nihāya, vol. 14, 7–8,

=== Third invasion and Takfir of Ilkhanate Allies ===
The year 1303 saw the third Mongol invasion of Syria by Ghazan Khan. What has been called Ibn Taymiyya's "most famous" fatwā was his third fatwa issued against the Mongols in the Mamluk's war. Ibn Taymiyya declared that jihad against the Mongol attack on the Malmuk sultanate was not only permissible, but obligatory. The reason being that the Mongols could not, in his opinion, be true Muslims despite the fact that they had converted to Sunni Islam because they ruled using what he considered 'man-made laws' (their traditional Yassa code) rather than Islamic law or Sharia. Because of this, he reasoned they were living in a state of jahiliyyah, or pre-Islamic pagan ignorance. Not only were Ilkhanate political elites and its military disbelievers in the eyes of Ibn Taymiyya; but anybody who joined their ranks were as guilty of riddah (apostasy) as them:

"Whoever joins them—meaning the Tatars—among commanders of the military and non-commanders, their ruling is the same as theirs, and they have apostatized from the laws [sharāʾiʿ]. If the righteous forbears [salaf] have called the withholders from charity apostates despite their fasting, praying, and not fighting the Muslims, how about those who became murderers of the Muslims with the enemies of Allah and His Messenger?"

— Ibn Taymiyya, in Majmu’ al-fatawa, vol. 28, 530,

The fatwa broke new Islamic legal ground because "no jurist had ever before issued a general authorization for the use of lethal force against Muslims in battle", and would later influence modern-day Jihadists in their use of violence against other Muslims whom they deemed as apostates. In his legal verdicts issued to inform the populace, Ibn Taymiyya classified the Tatars and their advocates into four types:

- Kaafir Asli (i.e., those original non-Muslims fighting in Tatar armies and who never embraced Islam)
- Muslims of other ethnicities who became apostates due to their alliance with Mongols
- Irreligious Muslims aligned with Ilkhanids whom Ibn Taymiyya analogized with renegade Arabian tribes of the Riddah wars
- Personally pious Muslims affiliated with the Mongol armies. Ibn Taymiyya harshly rebuked these people as the "most evil" faction; and argued that their piety was useless because of their decision to ally with non-Muslims who ruled by man-made laws. This rationale was also expanded to excommunicate those "court scholars" who vindicated the Tatar authorities

Ibn Taymiyya called on the Muslims to jihad once again and personally participated in the Battle of Marj al-Saffar against the Ilkhanid army; leading his disciples in the field with a sword. The battle began on April 20 of that year. On the same day, Ibn Taymiyya declared a fatwa which exempted Mamluk soldiers from fasting during Ramadan so that they could preserve their strength. Within two days the Mongols were severely crushed and the battle was won; thus ending Mongol control of Syria. These incidents greatly increased the scholarly prestige and social stature of Ibn Taymiyya amongst the masses, despite opposition from the establishment clergy. He would soon be appointed as the chief professor of the elite scholarly institute "Kāmiliyya Dār al-Haḍīth."

=== Imprisonment on charges of anthropomorphism ===
Ibn Taymiyya was a fervent polemicist who zealously launched theological refutations against various religious sects such as the Sufis, Jahmites, Ash'arites, Shias, Falsafa, etc., labelling them as heretics responsible for the crisis of Mongol invasions across the Islamic World. He was imprisoned several times for conflicting with the prevailing opinions of the jurists and theologians of his day. A judge from the city of Wasit, Iraq, requested that Ibn Taymiyya write a book on creed. His subsequent creedal work, Al-Aqidah Al-Waasitiyyah, caused him trouble with the authorities. Ibn Taymiyya adopted the view that God should be described as he was literally described in the Qur'an and in the hadith, and that all Muslims were required to believe this because according to him it was the view held by the early Muslim community (salaf). Within the space of two years (1305–1306) four separate religious council hearings were held to assess the correctness of his creed.

The first hearing was held with Ash'ari scholars who accused Ibn Taymiyya of anthropomorphism. At the time Ibn Taymiyya was 42 years old. He was protected by the then Governor of Damascus, Aqqush al-Afram, during the proceedings. The scholars suggested that he accept that his creed was simply that of the Hanbalites and offered this as a way out of the charge. However, if Ibn Taymiyya ascribed his creed to the Hanbali school of law then it would be just one view out of the four schools which one could follow rather than a creed everybody must adhere to. Uncompromising, Ibn Taymiyya maintained that it was obligatory for all scholars to adhere to his creed.

Two separate councils were held a year later on January 22 and 28, 1306. The first council was in the house of the Governor of Damascus Aqqush al-Afram, who had protected him the year before when facing the Shafii scholars. A second hearing was held six days later where the Indian scholar Safi al-Din al-Hindi found him innocent of all charges and accepted that his creed was in line with the "Qur'an and the Sunnah". Regardless, in April 1306 the chief Islamic judges of the Mamluk state declared Ibn Taymiyya guilty and he was incarcerated. He was released four months later in September.

After his release in Damascus, the doubts regarding his creed seemed to have resolved but this was not the case. A Shafii scholar, Ibn al-Sarsari, was insistent on starting another hearing against Ibn Taymiyya which was held once again at the house of the Governor of Damascus, Al-Afram. His book Al-Aqidah Al-Waasitiyyah was still not found at fault. At the conclusion of this hearing, Ibn Taymiyya and Ibn al-Sarsari were sent to Cairo to settle the problem.

== Life in Egypt ==
=== His debate on anthropomorphism and his imprisonment ===
On the arrival of Ibn Taymiyya and the Shafi'ite scholar in Cairo in 1306, an open meeting was held. The Mamluk sultan at the time was Al-Nasir Muhammad and his deputy attended the open meeting. Ibn Taymiyya was found innocent. Despite the open meeting, objections regarding his creed continued and he was summoned to the Citadel in Cairo for a munazara (legal debate), which took place on April 8, 1306. During the munazara, his views on divine attributes, specifically whether a direction could be attributed to God, were debated by the Indian scholar Safi al-Din al-Hindi, in the presence of Islamic judges. Ibn Taymiyya failed to convince the judges of his position and so was incarcerated for the charge of anthropomorphism on the recommendation of al-Hindi. Thereafter, he together with his two brothers were imprisoned in the Citadel of the Mountain (Qal'at al-Jabal), in Cairo until September 25, 1307. He was freed due to the help he received from two amirs; Salar and Muhanna ibn Isa, but he was not allowed to go back to Syria. He was then again summoned for a legal debate, but this time he convinced the judges that his views were correct and he was allowed to go free.

=== His trial for intercession and his imprisonment ===
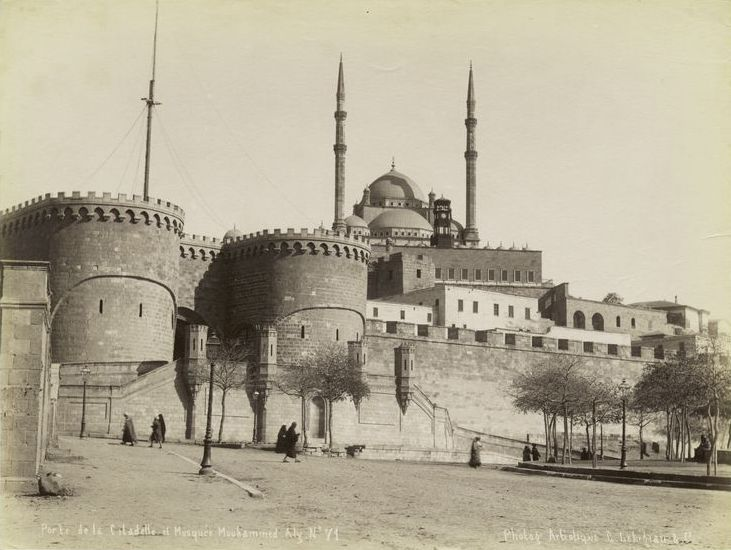
Citadel of Cairo, the place where Ibn Taymiyya was imprisoned for 18 months

Ibn Taymiyya continued to face troubles for his views which were found to be at odds with those of his contemporaries. His strong opposition to what he believed to be religious innovations, caused upset among the prominent Sufis of Egypt including Ibn Ata Allah and Karim al-Din al-Amuli, and the locals who started to protest against him. Their main contention was Ibn Taymiyya's stance on tawassul (intercession). In his view, a person could not ask anyone other than God for help except on the Day of Judgement when intercession in his view would be possible. At the time, the people did not restrict intercession to just the Day of Judgement but rather they said it was allowed in other cases. Due to this, Ibn Taymiyya, now aged 45, was ordered to appear before the Shafi'i judge Badr al-Din in March 1308 and was questioned on his stance regarding intercession. Thereafter, he was incarcerated in the prison of the judges in Cairo for some months. After his release, he was allowed to return to Syria, should he so wish. Ibn Taymiyya however stayed in Egypt for a further five years.

=== House arrest in Alexandria ===
1309, the year after his release, saw a new Mamluk sultan accede to the throne, Baibars al-Jashnakir. His reign, marked by economical and political unrest, only lasted a year. In August 1309, Ibn Taymiyya was taken into custody and placed under house arrest for seven months in the new sultan's palace in Alexandria. He was freed when al-Nasir Muhammad retook the position of sultan on March 4, 1310. Having returned to Cairo a week later, he was received by al-Nasir. The sultan would sometimes consult Ibn Taymiyya on religious affairs and policies during the rest of his three-year stay in Cairo. During this time he continued to teach and wrote his famous book Al-Kitab al-Siyasa al-shar'iyya (Treatise on the Government of the Religious Law), a book noted for its account of the role of religion in politics.

=== Return to Damascus and later years ===
He spent his last fifteen years in Damascus. Aged 50, Ibn Taymiyya returned to Damascus via Jerusalem on February 28, 1313. Damascus was now under the governorship of Tankiz. There, Ibn Taymiyya continued his teaching role as professor of Hanbali fiqh. This is when he taught his most famous student, Ibn Qayyim Al-Jawziyya, who went on to become a noted scholar in Islamic history. Ibn Qayyim was to share in Ibn Taymiyya's renewed persecution.

Three years after his arrival in the city, Ibn Taymiyya became involved in efforts to deal with the increasing Shia influence amongst Sunni Muslims. An agreement had been made in 1316 between the amir of Mecca and the Ilkhanid ruler Öljaitü, brother of Ghazan Khan, to allow a favourable policy towards Shi'ism in the city. Around the same time the Shia theologian Al-Hilli, who had played a crucial role in the Mongol ruler's decision to make Shi'ism the state religion of Persia, wrote the book Minhaj al-Karamah (The Way of Charisma'), which dealt with the Shia doctrine of the Imamate and also served as a refutation of the Sunni doctrine of the caliphate. In response, Ibn Taymiyya wrote his famous book, Minhaj as-Sunnah an-Nabawiyyah, as a refutation of Al-Hilli's work.

=== His fatwa on divorce and imprisonment ===
In 1318, Ibn Taymiyya wrote a treatise that would curtail the ease with which a Muslim man could divorce his wife. Ibn Taymiyya's fatwa on divorce was not accepted by the majority of scholars of the time and this continued into the Ottoman era. However, almost every modern Muslim nation-state has come to adopt Ibn Taymiyya's position on this issue of divorce. At the time he issued the fatwa, Ibn Taymiyya revived an edict by the sultan not to issue fatwas on this issue but he continued to do so, saying, "I cannot conceal my knowledge". As in previous instances, he stated that his fatwa was based on the Qur'an and hadith. His view on the issue was at odds with the Hanbali position. This proved controversial among the people in Damascus as well as the Islamic scholars who opposed him on the issue.

According to the scholars of the time, an oath of divorce counted as a full divorce and they were also of the view that three oaths of divorce taken under one occasion counted as three separate divorces. The significance of this was, that a man who divorces the same partner three times is no longer allowed to remarry that person until and if that person marries and divorces another person. Only then could the man, who took the oath, remarry his previous wife. Ibn Taymiyya accepted this but rejected the validity of three oaths taken under one sitting to count as three separate divorces as long as the intention was not to divorce. Moreover, Ibn Taymiyya was of the view that a single oath of divorce uttered but not intended, also does not count as an actual divorce. He stated that since this is an oath much like an oath taken in the name of God, a person must expiate for an unintentional oath in a similar manner.

Due to his views and also by not abiding to the sultan's letter two years before forbidding him from issuing a fatwa on the issue, three council hearings were held, in as many years (1318, 1319 and 1320), to deal with this matter. The hearing were overseen by the Viceroy of Syria, Tankiz. This resulted in Ibn Taymiyya being imprisoned on August 26, 1320, in the Citadel of Damascus. He was released about five months and 18 days later, on February 9, 1321, by order of the Sultan Al-Nasir. Ibn Taymiyya was reinstated as teacher of Hanbali law and he resumed teaching.

=== His risāla on visits to tombs and his final imprisonment ===
In 1310, Ibn Taymiyya had written a risāla (treatise) called Ziyārat al-Qubūr or according to another source, Shadd al-rihal. It dealt with the validity and permissibility of making a journey to visit the tombs of prophets and saints. It is reported that in the book "he condemned the cult of saints" and declared that traveling with the sole purpose of visiting Muhammad's grave was a blameworthy religious innovation. For this, Ibn Taymiyya, was imprisoned in the Citadel of Damascus sixteen years later on July 18, 1326, aged 63, along with his student Ibn Qayyim. The sultan also prohibited him from issuing any further fatwas. Hanbali scholar Ahmad ibn Umar al-Maqdisi accused Ibn Taymiyya of apostasy over the treatise.

=== His life in prison ===
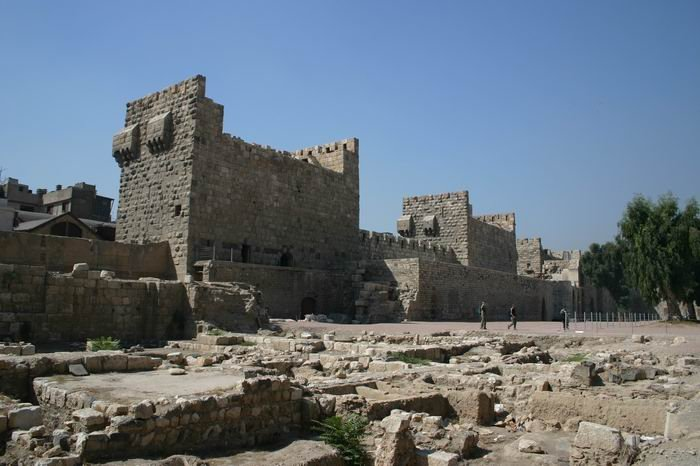
The Citadel of Damascus, the prison in which Ibn Taymiyya died

Ibn Taymiyya referred to his imprisonment as "a divine blessing". During his incarceration, he wrote that, "when a scholar forsakes what he knows of the Book of God and of the sunnah of His messenger and follows the ruling of a ruler which contravenes a ruling of God and his messenger, he is a renegade, an unbeliever who deserves to be punished in this world and in the hereafter."

During his imprisonment, he encountered opposition from the Maliki and Shafi'i Chief Justices of Damascus, Taḳī al-Dīn al-Ikhnāʾī. He remained in prison for over two years and ignored the sultan's prohibition, by continuing to deliver fatwas. During his incarceration Ibn Taymiyya wrote three works which are extant; Kitāb Maʿārif al-wuṣūl, Rafʿ al-malām, and Kitāb al-Radd ʿala 'l-Ikhnāʾī (The response to al-Ikhnāʾī). The last book was an attack on Taḳī al-Dīn al-Ikhnāʾī and explained his views on saints (wali).

When the Mongols invaded Syria in 1300, he was among those who called for a Jihad against them and he ruled that even though they had recently converted to Islam, they should be considered unbelievers. He went to Egypt in order to acquire support for his cause and while he was there, he got embroiled in religious-political disputes. When he attempted to prohibit the veneration of Muhammad's footprints in Damascus in 1304, he was accused of impiety and chased away by the people. Ibn Taymiyya's clerical enemies accused him of advocating anthropomorphism, and in 1306, he was imprisoned for more than a year. Upon his release, he condemned popular Sufi practices and he also condemned the influence of Ibn Arabi (d. 1240), causing him to earn the enmity of leading Sufi shaykhs in Egypt and causing him to serve another prison sentence. In 1310, he was released by the Egyptian Sultan.

In 1313, the Sultan allowed Ibn Taymiyya to return to Damascus, where he worked as a teacher and a jurist. He had supporters among the powerful, but his outspokenness and his nonconformity to traditional Sunni doctrines and his denunciation of Sufi ideals and practices continued to draw the wrath of the religious and political authorities in Syria and Egypt. He was arrested and released several more times, but while he was in prison, he was allowed to write Fatwas (advisory opinions on matters of law) in defense of his beliefs. Despite the controversy that surrounded him, Ibn Taymiyya's influence grew and it spread from Hanbali circles to members of other Sunni legal schools and Sufi groups. Among his foremost students were Ibn Kathir (d. 1373), a leading medieval historian and a Quran commentator, and Ibn Qayyim al-Jawziya (d. 1350), a prominent Hanbali jurist and a theologian who helped spread his teacher's influence after his teacher's death in 1328. Ibn Taymiyya died while he was a prisoner in the citadel of Damascus and he was buried in the city's Sufi cemetery.

== Death ==
He fell ill in early September 1328 and died at the age of 65, on September 26 of that year, whilst in prison at the Citadel of Damascus. Once this news reached the public, there was a strong show of support for him from the people. After the authorities had given permission, it is reported that thousands of people came to show their respects. They gathered in the Citadel and lined the streets up to the Umayyad Mosque. The funeral prayer was held in the citadel by scholar Muhammad Tammam, and a second was held in the mosque. A third and final funeral prayer was held by Ibn Taymiyya's brother, Zain al-Din. He was buried in Damascus, in Maqbara Sufiyya ("the cemetery of the Sufis"). His brother Sharafuddin had been buried in that cemetery before him.

Oliver Leaman says that being deprived of the means of writing led to Ibn Taymiyya's death. It is reported that two hundred thousand men and fifteen to sixteen thousand women attended his funeral prayer. Ibn Kathir says that in the history of Islam, only the funeral of Ahmad ibn Hanbal received a larger attendance. This is also mentioned by Ibn `Abd al-Hadi. Caterina Bori says that, "In the Islamic tradition, wider popular attendance at funerals was a mark of public reverence, a demonstration of the deceased's rectitude, and a sign of divine approbation."

Ibn Taymiyya is said to have "spent a lifetime objecting to tomb veneration, only to cast a more powerful posthumous spell than any of his Sufi contemporaries." On his death, his personal effects were in such demand "that bidders for his lice-killing camphor necklace pushed its price up to 150 dirhams, and his skullcap fetched a full 500." After he died incarcerated in the Damascus citadell, his affiliation with the Qadiriyya Sufi order earned him a funeral in the local Sufi cemetery and became an attraction for grave-veneration. A few mourners sought and succeeded in "drinking the water used for bathing his corpse." His tomb received "pilgrims and sightseers" for 600 years. His resting place is now "in the parking lot of a maternity ward", though as of 2009 its headstone was broken, according to author Sadakat Kadri.

== Contemporary Impact ==
Ibn Taymiyya's three unprecedented fatwas (legal verdicts) that excommunicated the Ilkhanid authorities and their supporters as apostates over their neglect to govern by Sharia (Islamic law) and preference of the traditional Mongol imperial code of Yassa; would form the theological basis of 20th century Islamist and Jihadist scholars and ideologues. Reviving Ibn Taymiyya's fatwas during the late 20th-century, Jihadist ideologues like Sayyid Qutb, Abd al-Salam al-Faraj, Abdullah Azzam, Usama bin Laden, Ayman al-Zawahiri, etc. made public Takfir (excommunication) of contemporary governments of the Muslim world and called for their revolutionary overthrowal through armed Jihad.

== Students ==
Several of Ibn Taymiyya's students became notable scholars in their own right. His students came from different backgrounds and belonged to various different schools of thought. The most well-known of them are Ibn Qayyim al-Jawziyya and Ibn Kathir, while his other students include:

- Al-Dhahabi
- Jamal al-Din al-Mizzi
- Ibn Abd al-Hadi
- Ibn Muflih
- Imad al-Din Ahmad al-Wasiti
- Najm al-Din al-Tufi
- Al-Ba'labakki
- Al-Bazzar
- Ibn Qadi al-Jabal
- Ibn Fadl Allah al-Amri
- Muhammad ibn al-Manj
- Ibn Abd al-Salam al-Batti
- Ibn al-Wardi (d. 1349)
- Umar al-Harrani

== Philosophy ==
Ibn Taimiyya was a materialist and held physicalist view on the world. This also extends to his view on God, who, according to ibn Taimiyya, is also composed of particles perceptible by at least one of the five senses. He rejects non-cognitivism of the traditionalists regarding the attributes of God – that God's attributes cannot be known – as well as the literal approach of the theologicans. Denying the existence of external universals, the meaning of God's attributes and characteristics derive from the context and through analogical reasoning.

The unseen world is, according to ibn Taimiyya, not a supernatural or immaterial world, but consists of spatially and temporary extended particulars. From ibn Taimiyya's physicalist viewpoint, the rejection of God's corperality tantamounts to a denial of God. Accordingly, God, angels, the afterlife, belong to the unseen, but could be perceived with ideal vision. Yet, ibn Taimiyya agrees with his fellow Muslim theologians that God cannot be divided and contents that God's size implies being composed of parts. God's body – understood as indivisible – fills the entirety of unoccupied space, filling and surrounding the entire universe.

Just like ibn Taimiyya denies empty space, hence arguing that alleged empty space is filled with God, ibn Taimiyya rejects independent time. Accordingly, similar to Aristotelian philosophy, the passing of time results from motion. Time is thus generated through God's eternal motion. Similar to Avicenna and Ibn Rushd, ibn Taimiyya denies creation ex nihilo. If the world was created from nothing, God must have undergone change at the moment of creation, which would violate God's perfectness. However, in contrast to his fellow theologians, God did not create from mercy alone, but also to benefit God Himself, as a selfless act would not be wise and God only acts with wisdom. God's self-sufficiency consists in needing no help in creation.

== Influence in his time ==
Prof. Al-Matroudi of SOAS university says that Ibn Taymiyya, "was perhaps the most eminent and influential Hanbali jurist of the Middle Ages and one of the most prolific among them. He was also a renowned scholar of Islam whose influence was felt not only during his lifetime but extended through the centuries until the present day." Ibn Taymiyya's followers often deemed him as Sheikh ul-Islam, an honorific title with which he is sometimes still termed today.

However, most scholars argue that Ibn Taymiyya did not enjoy popularity among the intelligentsia of his day. Yossef Rapoport and Shahab Ahmed assert that he was a minority figure in his own times and the centuries that followed. Caterina Bori goes further, arguing that despite popularity Ibn Taymiyya may have enjoyed among the masses, he appears to have been not merely unpopular among the scholars of his day, but somewhat of an embarrassment. Khalid El-Rouayheb notes similarly that Ibn Taymiyya had "very little influence on mainstream Sunni Islam until the nineteenth century" and that he was "a little-read scholar with problematic and controversial views." He also comments "the idea that Ibn Taymiyya had an immediate and significant impact on the course of Sunni Islamic religious history simply does not cohere with the evidence that we have from the five centuries that elapsed between his death and the rise of Sunni revivalism in the modern period." It was only since the late nineteenth and the early twentieth centuries that the scholarly influence of Ibn Taymiyya has come to acquire an unprecedented prominence in Muslim societies, due to the efforts of Islamic revivalists like Rashid Rida, who also gave him the title muhaddid. However, no known earlier Muslim scholar has given him that title and it does not appear in al-Suyuti's tajdid, but rather considers him a mujtahid.

In the pre-modern era, Ibn Taymiyya was considered a controversial figure within Sunni Islam and had a number of critics during his life and in the centuries thereafter. The Shafi'i scholar Ibn Hajar al-Haytami stated that,

Make sure you do not listen to what is in the books of Ibn Taymiyya and his student Ibn Qayyim al-Jawziyya and other such people who have taken their own whim as their God, and who have been led astray by God, and whose hearts and ears have been sealed, and whose eyes have been covered by Him... May God forsake the one who follows them, and purify the earth of their likes.

He also stated that,

Ibn Taymiyya is a servant whom God has forsaken, led astray, made blind and deaf, and degraded. Such is the explicit verdict of the leading scholars who have exposed the rottenness of his ways and the errors of his statements.

Taqi al-Din al-Hisni condemned Ibn Taymiyya in even stronger terms by referring to him as the "heretic from Harran" and similarly, Munawi considered Ibn Taymiyya to be an innovator though not an unbeliever. Taqi al-Din al-Subki criticised Ibn Taymiyya for "contradicting the consensus of the Muslims by his anthropomorphism, by his claims that accidents exist in God, by suggesting that God was speaking in time, and by his belief in the eternity of the world." Ibn Battūta (d. 770/1369) famously wrote a work questioning Ibn Taymiyya's mental state. The possibility of psychological abnormalities not with-standing, Ibn Taymiyya's personality, by multiple accounts, was fiery and oftentimes unpredictable.

The historian Al-Maqrizi said, regarding the rift between the Sunni Ash'ari's and Ibn Taymiyya, "People are divided into two factions over the question of Ibn Taymiyya; for until the present, the latter has retained admirers and disciples in Syria and Egypt." Both his supporters and rivals grew to respect Ibn Taymiyya because he was uncompromising in his views. Dhahabi's views towards Ibn Taymiyya were ambivalent. His praise of Ibn Taymiyya is invariably qualified with criticism and misgivings and he considered him to be both a "brilliant Shaykh" and also "cocky" and "impetuous". The Hanafi-Maturidi scholar 'Ala' al-Din al-Bukhari said that anyone that gives Ibn Taymiyya the title Shaykh al-Islām is a disbeliever.

Despite the prevalent condemnations of Ibn Taymiyya outside Hanbali school during the pre-modern period, many prominent non-Hanbali scholars such as Ibrahim al-Kurrani (d.1690), Shāh Walī Allāh al-Dihlawi (d. 1762), Mehmet Birgiwi (d. 1573), Ibn al-Amīr Al-San'ani (d. 1768), Muḥammad al-Shawkānī (d. 1834), etc. would come to the defense of Ibn Taymiyya and advocate his ideas during this era. In the 18th century, influential South Asian Islamic scholar and revivalist Shah Waliullah Dehlawi would become the most prominent advocate of the doctrines of Ibn Taymiyya, and profoundly transformed the religious thought in South Asia. His seminary, Madrasah-i-Rahimya, became a hub of intellectual life in the country, and the ideas developed there quickly spread to wider academic circles. Making a powerful defense of Ibn Taymiyya and his doctrines, Shah Waliullah wrote:

Our assessment of Ibn Taimiyya after full investigation is that he was a scholar of the 'Book of God' and had full command over its etymological and juristic implications. He remembered by heart the traditions of the prophet and accounts of elders (salaf)... He excelled in intelligence and brilliance. He argued in defence of Ahl al-Sunnah with great eloquence and force. No innovation or irreligious act is reported about him... there is not a single matter on which he is without his defence based on the Qur'an and the Sunnah. So it is difficult to find a man in the whole world who possesses the qualities of Ibn Taimiyya. No one can come anywhere near him in the force of his speech and writing. People who harassed him [and got him thrown in prison] did not possess even one-tenth of his scholarly excellence...

The reputation and stature of Ibn Taymiyya amongst non-Ḥanbalī Sunni scholars would significantly improve between the eighteenth and twentieth centuries. From a little-read scholar considered controversial by many, he would become one of the most popular scholarly figures in the Sunni religious tradition. The nineteenth-century Iraqi scholar Khayr al-Dīn al-Ālūsī (d. 1899) wrote an influential treatise titled Jalā’ al-‘aynayn fi muḥākamat al-Aḥmadayn in defense of Ibn Taymiyya. The treatise would make great impact on major scholars of the Salafiyya movement in Syria and Egypt, such as Jamāl al-Dīn al-Qāsimī (d. 1914) and Muḥammad Rashīd Riḍā (d. 1935). Praising Ibn Taymiyya as a central and heroic Islamic figure of the classical era, Rashid Rida wrote:

...after the power of the Ash‘aris reigned supreme in the Middle Ages (al-qurūn al-wusṭā) and the ahl al-ḥadīth and the followers of the salaf were weakened, there appeared in the eighth century [AH, fourteenth century AD] the great mujaddid, Shaykh al-Islam Aḥmad Taqī al-Dīn Ibn Taymiyya, whose like has not been seen in mastery of both the traditional and rational sciences and in the power of argument. Egypt and India have revived his books and the books of his student Ibn Qayyim al-Jawziyya, after a time when they were only available in Najd. Now, they have spread to both east and west, and will become the main support of the Muslims of the earth.

Ibn Taymiyya's works served as an inspiration for later Muslim scholars and historical figures, who have been regarded as his admirers or disciples. In the contemporary world, he may be considered at the root of Wahhabism, the Senussi order and other later reformist movements. Ibn Taymiyya has been noted to have influenced Rashid Rida, Abul A`la Maududi, Sayyid Qutb, Hassan al-Banna, Abdullah Azzam, and Osama bin Laden. The terrorist organization Islamic State in Iraq and the Levant used a fatwa of Ibn Taymiyya to justify the burning alive of Jordanian pilot Muath al-Kasasbeh. After the Iranian revolution, conservative Sunni ulema robustly championed Ibn Taymiyya's anti-Shia polemics across the Islamic World since the 1980s; and vast majority of Sunni intellectual circles adopted Ibn Taymiyya's rhetoric against Shi'ism.

== Influence in the modern period ==
In the 21st century, Ibn Taymiyya is one of the most cited medieval authors and his treatises are regarded to be of central intellectual importance by several Islamic revivalist movements. Ibn Taymiyya's disciples, consisting of both Hanbalis and non-Hanbalis, were attracted to his advocacy of ijtihad outside the established boundaries of the madhabs and shared his taste for activism and religious reform. Some of his unorthodox legal views in the field of Fiqh were also regarded as a challenge by mainstream Fuqaha.

Many modern thinkers looked upon ibn Taimiyya as a paragon of modern thinking. All thinkers emerging from Saudi Arabia looked upon ibn Taimiyya for inspiration. Abu Yaareb Al-Marzouki saw in ibn Taimiyya a herald of a religious nominalism. Yusuf al-Qaradawi evokes ibn Taimiyya as an authority of a pragmatic approach to jurisprudence and political engagement. Fazlur Rahman (d. 1988) considered ibn Taimiyya as a model for an Islamic reform.

=== Salafism ===
Ibn Taymiyya's appeals to the precedence of the Qur’an and the Sunna over the authority of the madh'hab system has inspired a wide range of Islamic reform movements over the last few centuries, and especially the Salafiyya reform movement that differ from other Sunnis who adhere to the four legal schools of Fiqh (jurisprudence). These include the 17th century Kadizadeli movement, 18th century Wahhabi movement as well as the Islamic reformist movement of Ibn al-Amīr Al-San’ani (d. 1768) and Muḥammad al-Shawkānī (d. 1834) in Yemen. In the nineteenth century, Taymiyyan tradition would expand across the Islamic World; influencing the Ahl-i Hadith movement in South Asia and the Salafiyya movement in Iraq, Syria and Egypt.

Ibn Taymiyya adamantly insisted that his theological doctrines constituted the original creed of the Salaf, as well as that of Abul Hasan al-Ash'ari; the eponym of the Ash'arite school. He also believed that Sharia (Islamic law) was best preserved through the teachings and practices of the Salaf, the earliest three generations of Muslims. Modern Islamic revivalist movements salute Ibn Taymiyya as "the architect of Salafism", which symbolises the concept of reviving the traditions and values of the Golden Age of the prophet. For Salafiyya movements across the Islamic World, Ibn Taymiyya is their exemplar scholar who revived the methodology of the Salaf, and also a social reformer who defiantly stood against foreign occupation. Today, Salafi Muslims constitute the most avid readers and promoters of the works of Ibn Taymiyya.

=== Modern Islamism ===
Various concepts within modern Islamist movements can be attributed to Ibn Taymiyya. Ibn Taymiyya is highly revered in contemporary militant Islamist and Jihadist circles for his 1303 Fatwa of Takfir (excommunication) against Mongol Ilkhanate rulers (who were recent converts to Islam) and his assertion that it became obligatory for "true Muslims" to wage Jihad against the apostate Mongol leaders and Muslim citizens who accepted the Yassa code. Influenced by Ibn Taymiyya, Sayyid Qutb would take up Ibn Taymiyya's anti-Mongol fatwa and apply it on contemporary regimes across the Islamic World. Ibn Taymiyya's other major theological mission was to re-assert the primacy of armed jihad in Islamic faith, which played a major role in shaping future militant interpretations of Islam. Along with total, literal adherence to Sharia, he held that waging martial jihad was an Islamic religious obligation for all Muslims, when under foreign invasion. These ideas would be readily embraced in the 20th century by various militant Islamist movements and underpinned the theological justification for militancy of groups like Al-Qaeda, ISIS, etc. Scholars like Yahya Michot have noted that Ibn Taymiyya "has thus become a sort of forefather of al-Qaeda."

One of main arguments put forth by Ibn Taymiyya was his categorising the world into distinct territories: the domain of Islam (dar al-Islam), where the rule is of Islam and sharia law is enforced; the domain of unbelief (dar-al-kufr) ruled by unbelievers; and the domain of war (dar al-harb) which is territory under the rule of unbelievers who are involved in an active or potential conflict with the domain of Islam. (Ibn Taymiyya included a fourth. When the Mongols, whom he considered unbelievers, took control of the city of Mardin the population included many Muslims. Believing Mardin was neither the domain of Islam, as Islam was not legally applied with an armed forces consisting of Muslims, nor the domain of war because the inhabitants were Muslim, Ibn Taymiyya created a new "composite" category, known as dar al-`ahd.) A second concept is making a declaration of apostasy (takfir) against a Muslim who does not obey Islam. But at the same time Ibn Taymiyya maintained that no one can question anothers faith and curse them as based on one's own desire, because faith is defined by God and the prophet. He said, rather than cursing or condemning them, an approach should be taken where they are educated about the religion.

Another concept attributed to Ibn Taymiyya is, "the duty to oppose and kill Muslim rulers who do not implement the revealed law (shari'a). Based on this doctrine, Ibn Taymiyya excommunicated the Ilkhanid state for not ruling by Sharia (Islamic law); despite officially professing Islam. Ibn Taymiyya issued various fatwas obliging all Muslims to fight the Mongols; declaring them as mushrikun (polytheists) similar to the people from the age of Jahiliyya (pre-Islamic ignorance). Thus, he is widely regarded as the "spiritual forefather" of the Salafi-Jihadist thought. 20th century Islamist ideologues like Muhammad Rashid Rida, Sayyid Qutb, Abd al Salam Faraj, Usama bin Laden, etc. drew upon these revolutionary ideas to justify armed Jihad against the contemporary nation-states. Ibn Taymiyya's fatwa on Alawites as "more infidel than Christians and Jews" has been recited by Muslim Brotherhood affiliated scholar Yusuf al-Qaradawi.

Ibn Taymiyya's role in the Islamist movements of the twentieth and twenty first century have also been noted by the previous Coordinator for Counterterrorism at the United States Department of State, Daniel Benjamin, who labels the chapter on the history of modern Islamic movements in his book The Age of Sacred Terror, as "Ibn Taymiyya and His children". Yossef Rapoport, a reader in Islamic history at Queen Mary, however, says this is not a probable narrative. Ibn Taymiyya's intellectual tradition and ideas such as his emphasis on the revival of pristine ideals and practices of early generations also made an intense impact on the leading ideologue of revolutionary Islamism in South Asia, Sayyid Abul A'la Maududi (1903–1979 C.E/ 1321–1399 A.H).

=== Mardin fatwas and the Mardin Conference ===
One of Ibn Taymiyya's most famous fatwas are regarding the Mongols who had conquered and destroyed the Abbasid caliphate in 1258 and had then converted to Islam. Once they were in control the town of Mardin, they behaved unjustly with their subjects so the people of Mardin asked Ibn Taymiyya for a legal verdict regarding the classification of the territory under which they live. He categorized the territory as dar al-`ahd which in some ways is similar to dar al-kufr (domain of unbelievers). Included in his verdict was declaring the Mongol ruler Ghazan and other Mongols who did not accept shari'a in full, as unbelievers. He was also asked whether Muslims living in Mardin had to emigrate (Hijrah) to Islamic territories on account of implementation of man-made laws. Ibn Taymiyya responded in a detailed fatwa:

"If he who resides in (Mārdīn) is unable to practice his religion, then he must emigrate. If this is not the case, then it remains preferable but not mandatory. The helping of the enemies of the Muslims with their lives and wealth is prohibited upon them and it is required to abstain from that from whatever route possible.. if that is not possible except by undertaking migration, then it is obligatory... It is not of the category of the Dar al-Islam nor of the category of Dar al-Harb. It is a third division by which the Muslim is treated according to what he deserves, and outsiders are dealt with as they deserve."

— Ibn Taymiyya, in Majmu’ al-fatawa, vol. 28: 240-41,

According to Nettler and Kéchichian, Ibn Taymiyya affirmed that Jihad against the Mongols, "was not only permissible but obligatory because the latter ruled not according to Sharīʿah but through their traditional, and therefore manmade, Yassa code. This essentially meant that Mongols were living in a state of jāhilīyah (ignorance)." The authors further state that his two famous students, Ibn Qayyim and Ibn Kathir, agreed with this ruling. He called for a defensive jihad to mobilize the people to kill the Mongol rulers and any one who supported them, Muslim or non-Muslim. Ibn Taymiyya when talking about those who support the Mongols said, "Everyone who is with them (Mongols) in the state over which they rule has to be regarded as belonging to the most evil class of men. He is either an atheist (zindīq) or a hypocrite who does not believe in the essence of the religion of Islam. This means that he (only) outwardly pretends to be Muslim or he belongs to the worst class of all people who are the people of the bida` (heretical innovations)." Yahya Mochet says that, Ibn Taymiyya's call to war was not simply to cause a "rebellion against the political power in place" but to repel an "external enemy".

In another series of fatwas, Ibn Taymiyya reiterated the religious obligation of Muslims to fight the Ilkhanids on account of their negligence of Islamic laws. He also took issue with their non-religious approach to dealing with various communities such as Christians, Jews, Buddhists, etc. and employing a large chunk of their armies with non-Muslims. Citing these and various other reasons, Ibn Taymiyya pronounced:

"Fighting them [the Tatars] is obligatory by consensus of the Muslims.. If fighting against the Kurds and the Arabs and others from the Bedouins who do not adhere to the Law of Islam is obligated even if they are not of harm to the people living in the cities, then how about these people? Yes, it is required to exhibit the laws in fighting them.. They call to the religion of Islam and praise the religion of these disbelievers over the religion of the Muslims,.. and they legislate in what they dispute between themselves with the legislation of the time of ignorance, not with the legislation of Allah and His Messenger. Such is the case of the elders among their viziers and others who put the religion of Islam similar to the religion of the Jews and Christians, and claiming that these are all ways to Allah.. Then among them are those who choose the religion of the Jews or Christians, and those who choose the religion of the Muslims. This phenomenon is increasing in great number among them, even in their jurists and worshippers, especially the Jahmites from the Pharaonic Atheists and the like, as philosophy has overtaken their thought... The viziers who spread the views of their leader ultimately lead them into the aforementioned class [i.e., they leave Islam], they become these Philosopher Jews, ascribing to Islam what they have of their Judaism and philosophy."

— Ibn Taymiyya, in Majmu’ al-fatawa, vol. 28: 501-506, 521-524,

In 2010, a group of Islamic Scholars at the Mardin conference argued that Ibn Taymiyya's famous fatwa about the residents of Mardin when it was under the control of the Mongols was misprinted into an order to "fight" the people living under their territory, whereas the actual statement is, "The Muslims living therein should be treated according to their rights as Muslims, while the non-Muslims living there outside of the authority of Islamic Law should be treated according to their rights." They have based their understanding on the original manuscript in the Al-Zahiriyah Library, and the transmission by Ibn Taymiyya's student Ibn Muflih. The participants of the Mardin conference also rejected the categorization of the world into different domains of war and peace, stating that the division was a result of the circumstances at the time. The participants further stated that the division has become irrelevant with the existence of nation states.

== Views about him ==
=== Modern Islamic scholarship ===
Ibn Taymiyya is widely regarded as an anti-rationalist "hater of logic" and a strict literalist who was responsible for the demise of rationalist tendencies within the classical Sunni tradition. Through his polemical treatises such as al-Radd ‘ala al-mantiqiyyın (Refutation of the Rationalists); Ibn Taymiyya zealously denounced syllogism, which provided the rational foundations for both Kalam (speculative theology) and Falsafa.

According to Lebanese philosopher Majid Fakhry, "Ibn Taymiyah protests against the abuses of philosophy and theology and advocates a return to the orthodox ways of the ancients (al-salaf)... in his religious zeal he is determined to abolish centuries of religious truth as they had been long before they became troubled by theological and philosophical controversies."

Jamaat-e Islami leader Abdul Haq Ansari contends the ubiquitous notion that Ibn Taymiyya rejected Sufism outright as erroneous. While "the popular image of Ibn Taymiyya [is] ... that he [criticized] Sufism indiscriminately ... [was] deadly against the Sufis, and ... [saw] no place for Sufism in Islam," it is historically known, according to the same scholar, that Ibn Taymiyya actually considered Tasawwuf to be a significant discipline of Islam. "Far from saying [Sufism] has no place in Islam", Ibn Taymiyya was on the whole "sympathetic" towards what everyone at the time considered an important aspect of Islamic life. Various scholars have also asserted that Ibn Taymiyya had a deep reverence and appreciation for the works of such major Sufi Awliyaa (saints) such as Junayd, Sahl al-Tustari, Abu Talib al-Makki, Bayazid Bastami, etc., and was part of the Qadiriyya Sufi order himself. Saudi scholar Hatem al-Awni has criticised Ibn Taymiyya over his sectarian discourse against Ash'arite and Maturidite schools as well as his creedal beliefs like three-fold classification of Tawhid (monotheism). He also wrote about the origins of Sufism and types of Sufis in his Majmu' al-Fatawa, which equates the "Sufi of realities" with the "siddeeq," or very truthful Muslim.

=== Western scholarship ===
Scholars like Ignac Goldziher described Ibn Taymiyya as a "Hanbalite zealot" who harshly denounced various practices as bid'ah (religious innovations) and rejected all forms of philosophical influences, speculative theology, Sufism and doctrines like Wahdat al-Wujud.

Others such as the French scholar Henri Laoust (1905–1983) have argued that such portrayals of Ibn Taymiyya are flawed inasmuch as they are often borne of a limited reading of the theologian's substantial corpus of works, many of which have not yet been translated from the original Arabic. According to Laoust, Ibn Taymiyya wanted to reform the practice of medieval Sufism as part of his wider aim to reform Sunni Islam (of which Sufism was a major aspect at the time) by divesting both these traditions of what he perceived as heretical innovations within them.

According to James Pavlin, Professor of theology at Rutgers University: "Ibn Taymiyya remains one of the most controversial Islamic thinkers today because of his supposed influence on many fundamentalist movements. The common understanding of his ideas have been filtered through the bits and pieces of his statements that have been misappropriated by alleged supporters and avowed critics alike."

== Works ==
Ibn Taymiyya left behind a considerable body of work, ranging from 350 (according to his student Ibn Qayyim al-Jawziyya) to 500 (according to his student al-Dhahabi). Oliver Leaman says Ibn Taymiyya produced some 700 works in the field of Islamic sciences. His scholarly output has been described as immense with a wide scope and its contents "bear the marks of brilliant insights hastily jotted down". In his early life, his work was mostly based on theology and the use of reason in interpretation of scriptural evidences, with later works focusing on refutation of Greek logic, questioning the prevalent practices of the time, and anti-Christian and anti-Shia polemics. Ibn Taymiyya's total works have not all survived and his extant works of 35 volumes are incomplete. The ascendancy of scholastic interest in his medieval treatises would recommence through the gradual efforts by 18th-century Islamic reform movements. Salafi theologians of Syria, Iraq, and Egypt of the late 19th and early 20th centuries would edit, publish, and mass-circulate many of his censured manuscripts among the Muslim public, making Ibn Taymiyya the most-read classical Islamic theologian in the world; however, as his scholarly impact increased, dissensions and altercations over Ibn Taymiyya's viewpoints continue to escalate.

=== Extant books and essays ===
- Majmu' al-Fatawa al-Kubra – collected centuries after his death, and contains several of the works mentioned below; 36 volumes.
- Minhaj al-Sunna al-Nabawiyya – four volumes; in modern critical editions it amounts to more than 2,000 pages.
- Al-Aqida al-Wasitiyya
- Al-Siasat Al-Shariah Fi 'Islahul Rai Wal Raiyah
- Al-Jawab al-Sahih li-man Baddala Din al-Masih – a response to Christianity; seven volumes; in modern critical editions it amounts to more than 2,000 pages.
- Dar Ta'arud al-Aql wa-l-Naql (also called al-Muwafaqa) – 11 volumes; in modern critical editions it amounts to some 4,000 pages.
- Al-Aqida al-Hamawiyya
- Al-Asma' wa-l-Sifat – two volumes
- Kitab al-Iman
- Kitab al-Safadiyya – against the philosophers who said the miracles of Muhammad are merely manifestations of the strength of inherent faculties, and who said the universe is eternal
- Al-Sarim al-Maslul ala Shatim al-Rasul — written in response to an incident in which Ibn Taymiyya heard a Christian insulting Muhammad
- Fatawa al-Kubra
- Fatawa al-Misriyya
- Al-Radd ala al-Mantiqiyyin
- Naqd al-Ta'sis
- Al-Ubudiyya
- Iqtida' al-Sirat al-Mustaqim
- Al-Siyasa al-Shar'iyya
- Risala fi al-Ruh wa-l-Aql
- Al-Tawassul wa-l-Wasila
- Sharh Futuh al-Ghayb – a commentary on Futuh al-Ghayb by Abd al-Qadir al-Jilani
- Al-Hisba fi al-Islam – a book on Islamic economics

=== English translations ===
- The Friends of Allah and the Friends of Shaytan
- Kitab al-Iman: The Book of Faith, a book on the Islamic articles of faith
- Diseases of the Hearts and their Cures
- The Relief from Distress
- Fundamentals of Enjoining Good & Forbidding Evil
- The Concise Legacy
- The Goodly Word
- The Madinan Way
- Ibn Taymiyya against the Greek Logicians
- Muslims Under Non-Muslim Rule

=== Lost works ===
Many of Ibn Taymiyya's books are thought to be lost. Their existence is only known through various reports written by scholars throughout history as well as some treatises written by Ibn Taymiyya himself. One particularly notable lost work is al-Bahr al-Muhit, which was 40 volumes of Quranic exegesis that Ibn Taymiyya wrote in the prison of Damascus. Ibn Hajar al-Asqalani mentions the existence of this work in his work, al-Durar al-Kamina.

== See also ==
- Ibn Sufi
- List of works by Ibn Taymiyyah
