= Junayd =

Junayd or Junaid or Junayed (Arabic: جنيد) and sometimes Jounaid is a male given name which means soldier or warrior.

== Persons with the given name ==
=== Junaid ===
- Junaid Akbar (born 1977), Pakistani politician
- Junaid Babunagari (1953–2021), Bangladeshi Islamic scholar
- Junaid Ismail Dockrat, South African Dentist
- Junaid Hartley (born 1978), South African footballer
- Junaid Jamshed (1964–2016), Pakistani singer
- Khawaja Junaid (born 1966), Pakistani field hockey player
- Junaid Khan (cricketer) (born 1989), Pakistani cricketer
- Junaid Khan (Pakistani actor) (born 1981), Pakistani actor and singer-songwriter
- Junaid Siddique (born 1987), Bangladeshi cricketer
- Junaid Siddiqui (born 1985), Pakistani-Canadian cricketer
- Junaid Thorne (born 1991), Australian Islamic preacher
- Junaid Zia (born 1983), Pakistani cricketer

=== Zunaid ===
- Zunaid Ahmed Palak (born 1980), Bangladeshi politician

=== Junayd ===
- Junayd of Baghdad (830–910), Persian Sufi
- Junayd (illustrator) (circa 1396, Baghdad)
- Junayd of Gujarat, Indian Sufi
- Junayd of Shiraz (fl. 1389), Persian Sufi
- Junayd of Aydın (died 1425), nobleman and warrior in Anatolia
- Shaykh Junayd (died 1460), the Sheikh of Safaviya

== Persons with the middle name ==
- Mohammed Junaid Babar (born c. 1975), Pakistani-American terrorist

== Persons with the surname ==
=== Junaid ===
- Bushra Junaid, Canadian artist, curator and arts administrator
- Junaid Muhammad Junaid (born 1955), Yemeni poet
- Masooma Junaid, (born 1989), Pakistani cricketer
- Muctar Yunos Junaid, Filipino politician
- Rameez Junaid (born 1981), Australian tennis player

=== Juned ===
- Abdul Aziz Juned (born 1941), Grand Mufti of Brunei

== See also ==
- Cüneyt, Turkish form of the name
- Ismail and Junaid, Pakistani musical band
- Loon (rapper), adopted the name Amir Junaid Muhadith after converting to Islam
