= List of works by Ibn Taymiyyah =

List of books by Islamic scholar Ibn Taymiyyah

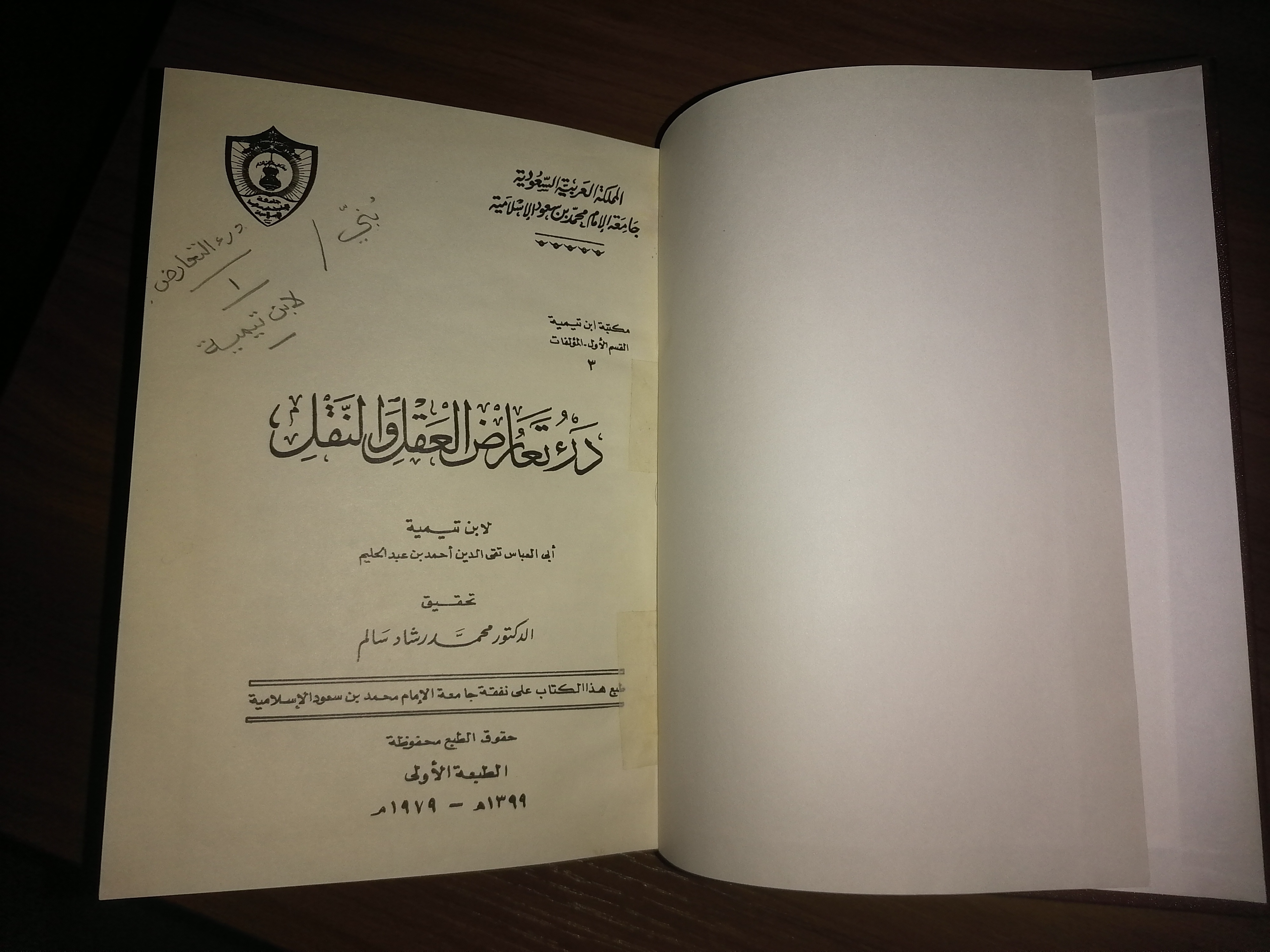
The first page of Dar' Ta'arud al-Aql wa-al-Naql, published by Imam Muhammad bin Saud Islamic University, 1979.

Ibn Taymiyya left behind a considerable body of work, ranging from 350 (according to his student Ibn Qayyim al-Jawziyya) to 500 (according to his student al-Dhahabi). Oliver Leaman says Ibn Taymiyya produced some 700 works in the field of Islamic sciences. His scholarly output has been described as immense with a wide scope and its contents "bear the marks of brilliant insights hastily jotted down". In his early life, his work was mostly based on theology and the use of reason in interpretation of scriptural evidences, with later works focusing on refutation of Greek logic, questioning the prevalent practices of the time, and anti-Christian and anti-Shia polemics. Ibn Taymiyya's total works have not all survived and his extant works of 35 volumes are incomplete. The ascendancy of scholastic interest in his medieval treatises would recommence through the gradual efforts by 18th-century Islamic reform movements. Salafi theologians of Syria, Iraq, and Egypt of the late 19th and early 20th centuries would edit, publish, and mass-circulate many of his censured manuscripts among the Muslim public, making Ibn Taymiyya the most-read classical Islamic theologian in the world; however, as his scholarly impact increased, dissensions and altercations over Ibn Taymiyya's viewpoints continue to escalate.

Many of Ibn Taymiyya's books are thought to be lost. Their existence is only known through various reports written by scholars throughout history as well as some treatises written by Ibn Taymiyya himself. The following is the list of his known works compliled by Muhammad al-Munajjid.

== Books and treatises ==
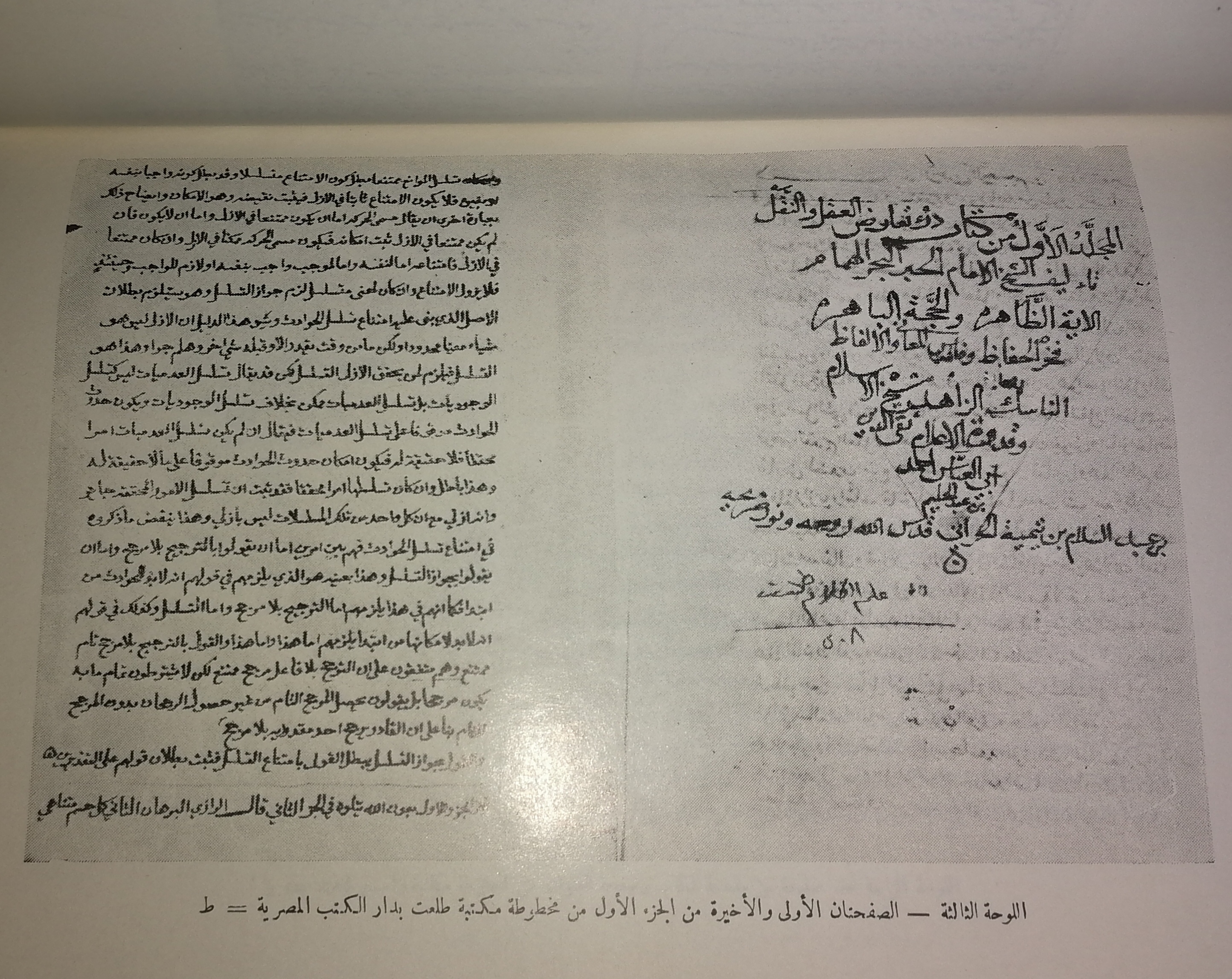
The first and last pages of a manuscript of Dar' Ta'arud from the Tal'at Library at the National Library of Egypt.

- Kitāb al-Īmān (transl. The Book of Faith)
- Kitāb al-Istiqāmah (transl. The Book of Uprightness/Steadfastness)
- Kitāb Talbīs al-Jahmiyyah fī Taʾsīs Bidaʿihim al-Kalāmiyyah (transl. The Deception of the Jahmites in Establishing Their Theological Innovations)
- Kitāb Darʾ Taʿāruḍ al-ʿAql wa-al-Naql (transl. The Refutation of the Conflict Between Reason and Revelation)
- Kitāb al-ʿUbūdiyyah (transl. The Book of Servitude/Worship)
- Kitāb al-Jawāb ʿammā Awradahu Kamāl al-Dīn al-Sharīshī ʿalā Kitābihi Taʿāruḍ al-ʿAql wa-al-Naql (transl. The Response to What Kamāl al-Dīn al-Sharīshī Raised Against His Book on the Conflict of Reason and Revelation)
- Minhāj al-Sunnah al-Nabawiyyah fī Naqḍ Kalām al-Shīʿah wa-al-Qadariyyah (transl. The Path of the Prophetic Sunnah in Refuting the Speech of the Shīʿah and the Qadarites)
- Al-Risālah al-Tadmuriyyah (transl. The Tadmur Epistle — on reconciling divine decree and the law)
- Al-Fatwā al-Ḥamawiyyah (transl. The Ḥamah Fatwa — on the divine attributes)
- Kitāb Jawāb al-Iʿtirāḍāt al-Miṣriyyah ʿalā al-Fatwā al-Ḥamawiyyah (transl. The Response to the Egyptian Objections Against the Ḥamah Fatwa)
- Kitāb al-Jawāb al-Ṣaḥīḥ li-man Baddala Dīn al-Masīḥ (transl. The Correct Response to Those Who Altered the Religion of Messiah)
- Al-Furqān — Bayān Awliyāʾ al-Raḥmān wa-Awliyāʾ al-Shayṭān (transl. The Criterion — Distinguishing the Friends of the Merciful from the Friends of Satan)
- Al-Ṣārim al-Maslūl ʿalā Shātim al-Rasūl (transl. The Drawn Sword Against the Insulter of the Messenger)
- Iqtiḍāʾ al-Ṣirāṭ al-Mustaqīm fī al-Radd ʿalā Aṣḥāb al-Jaḥīm (transl. The Necessity of the Straight Path in Refuting the Companions of Hellfire)
- Dafʿ al-Malām ʿan al-Aʾimmah al-Aʿlām (transl. Repelling Blame from the Eminent Imams)
- Al-Siyāsah al-Sharʿiyyah li-Iṣlāḥ al-Rāʿī wa-al-Raʿiyyah (transl. Legitimate Politics for the Reform of the Ruler and the Ruled)
- Kitāb fī al-Wasīlah (transl. The Book on Intercession/Means of Approach)
- Al-Tuḥfah al-ʿIrāqiyyah fī al-Aʿmāl al-Qalbiyyah (transl. The Iraqi Gift on the Actions of the Heart)
- Al-ʿAqīdah al-Wāsiṭiyyah (transl. The Wāsiṭ Creed — on the doctrine of the saved sect)
- Kitāb Sharḥ Awwal al-Muḥaṣṣal (transl. Commentary on the Opening of al-Muḥaṣṣal)
- Kitāb al-Radd ʿalā Ahl Kisrawān al-Rāfiḍah (transl. The Refutation of the Rāfiḍī People of Kisrawān)
- Al-Hūlākūniyyah (transl. The Hülegü Epistle — response to a question posed on behalf of the Mongol ruler)
- Kitāb fī al-Radd ʿalā al-Bakrī fī al-Istighāthah (transl. Refutation of al-Bakrī on Seeking Aid from the Dead)
- Sharḥ ʿalā Awwal Kitāb al-Ghaznawī fī Uṣūl al-Dīn (transl. Commentary on the Opening of al-Ghaznawī's Work on the Foundations of Religion)
- Kitāb fī al-Radd ʿalā al-Manṭiq (transl. The Refutation of Logic)
- Sharḥ ʿAqīdat al-Aṣfahānī (transl. Commentary on the Creed of al-Aṣfahānī)
- Sharḥ Masāʾil min al-Arbaʿīn li-al-Rāzī (transl. Commentary on Questions from al-Rāzī's Forty)
- Al-Masāʾil al-Iskandarāniyyah (transl. The Alexandrian Questions — refuting Ibn Sabʿīn and others)
- Kitāb fī Miḥnatih fī Miṣr (transl. The Book on His Trial in Egypt — including refutation of the doctrine of kalām nafsī from ~80 angles)
- Kitāb al-Kalām ʿalā Irādat al-Rabb wa-Qudratih (transl. On the Will and Power of the Lord)
- Al-Kīlāniyyah (transl. The Kīlān Epistle — on the question of the Quran)
- Qawāʿid fī Ithbāt al-Maʿād wa-al-Radd ʿalā Ibn Sīnā fī Risālatih al-Aḍḥawiyyah (transl. Principles on Affirming the Resurrection and Refuting Ibn Sīnā's Aḍḥawiyyah Epistle)
- Taḥqīq al-Ithbāt fī al-Asmāʾ wa-al-Ṣifāt (transl. The Verified Affirmation of the Divine Names and Attributes)
- Al-Marrākushiyyah (transl. The Marrakesh Fatwa — on the attributes)
- Fatwā fī Masʾalat al-ʿUluww (transl. Fatwa on the Question of God's Transcendence Above)
- Fatwā Tatḍammanu Ṣifāt al-Kamāl mimmā Yastaḥiqquh al-Rabb (transl. Fatwa Comprising the Attributes of Perfection Belonging to the Lord)
- Jawāb fī Taʿlīl Masʾalat al-Afʿāl (transl. Response on the Causation of Divine Acts)
- Jawāb fī Masʾalat al-Qurʾān (transl. Response on the Question of the Quran — from Egypt)
- Al-Baʿlabakkiyyah (transl. The Baalbek Epistle — on the disagreements regarding kalām)
- Al-Qādiriyyah (transl. The Qādiriyyah Epistle — on the Quran)
- Jawāb Masʾalah fī al-Qurʾān hal huwa Ḥarf wa-Ṣawt am lā (transl. Response: Is the Quran Letters and Sound or Not?)
- Al-Azhariyyah (transl. The Azhar Epistle)
- Al-Baghdādiyyah (transl. The Baghdad Epistle — on the Quran)
- Masāʾil fī al-Shakl wa-al-Nuqaṭ (transl. Questions on the Vocalization Marks and Dots of the Quran)
- Kitāb Ibṭāl Qawl al-Falāsifah bi-Ithbāt al-Jawāhir al-ʿAqliyyah (transl. Refutation of the Philosophers' Claim Affirming Intellectual Substances)
- Kitāb Ibṭāl Qawl al-Falāsifah bi-Qidam al-ʿĀlam (transl. Refutation of the Philosophers' Claim of the Eternity of the World)
- Al-Ṣaʿīdiyyah (transl. The Ṣaʿīd Epistle)
- Al-Ḥawfiyyah (transl. The Ḥawf Creed)
- Sharḥ Risālat Ibn ʿAbdūs fī Uṣūl al-Dīn (transl. Commentary on Ibn ʿAbdūs's Epistle on the Foundations of Religion)
- Kitāb fī Tawḥīd al-Falāsifah ʿalā Naẓm Ibn Sīnā (transl. On the Philosophers' Concept of Divine Unity According to Ibn Sīnā's System)
- Sharḥ al-ʿUmdah (transl. Commentary on al-ʿUmdah — in fiqh)
- Sharḥ al-Muḥarrar (transl. Commentary on al-Muḥarrar)
- Al-Taḥrīr fī Masʾalat al-Khaḍir (transl. The Investigation on the Question of al-Khaḍir)
- Taḥrīm al-Samāʿ (transl. The Prohibition of Listening to Music)
- Taʿlīqah ʿalā Futūḥ al-Ghayb li-ʿAbd al-Qādir al-Jīlānī (transl. Annotations on ʿAbd al-Qādir al-Jīlānī's Futūḥ al-Ghayb)
- Sharḥ Duʿāʾ Abī Bakr (transl. Commentary on the Supplication of Abū Bakr)
- Al-Durr al-Manthūr fī Ziyārat al-Qubūr (transl. Scattered Pearls on the Visitation of Graves)
- Al-Furqān bayna al-Ḥaqq wa-al-Bāṭil (transl. The Criterion Between Truth and Falsehood)
- Al-Wāsiṭah bayna al-Ḥaqq wa-al-Khalq (transl. The Intermediary Between the Truth and Creation)
- Al-Radd ʿalā man Qāla bi-Fanāʾ al-Jannah wa-al-Nār (transl. Refutation of Those Who Claim the Annihilation of Paradise and Hellfire)
- Sharḥ Ḥadīth al-Nuzūl (transl. Commentary on the Hadith of the Divine Descent)
- Sharḥ al-ʿAqīdah al-Aṣfahāniyyah (transl. Commentary on the Aṣfahānī Creed)
- Naqd Marātib al-Ijmāʿ (transl. Critique of Ibn Ḥazm's Levels of Consensus)
- Al-Ṣafadiyyah (transl. The Ṣafad Epistle)
- Al-Kalim al-Ṭayyib (transl. The Good Word — on adhkār)
- Bughyat al-Murtād fī al-Radd ʿalā al-Mutafalsifah wa-al-Bāṭiniyyah wa-al-Qarāmiṭah (transl. The Seeker's Goal in Refuting the Pseudo-Philosophers, the Esotericists, and the Qarmatians)
- Sujūd al-Tilāwah — Maʿānīhi wa-Aḥkāmuh (transl. The Prostration of Recitation — Its Meanings and Rulings)
- Al-Qawāʿid al-Nūrāniyyah (transl. The Luminous Principles — on fiqh)
- Al-Qawāʿid wa-al-Masāʾil (transl. Principles and Questions)
- Qāʿidah fī Ibṭāl Qawl al-Falāsifah anna al-Wāḥid lā Yaṣduru ʿanhu illā Wāḥid (transl. Principle Refuting the Philosophers' Claim That Only One Can Issue from the One)
- Qāʿidah fī al-Qaḍāyā al-Wahmiyyah (transl. Principle on Illusory Propositions)
- Qāʿidah fīmā Yatanāhā wa-mā lā Yatanāhā (transl. Principle on the Finite and the Infinite)
- Jawāb fī al-ʿAzm ʿalā al-Maʿṣiyah hal Yuʿāqab al-ʿAbd ʿalayh (transl. Response: Is a Person Punished for the Intention to Sin?)
- Qāʿidah fī anna Mukhālafat al-Rasūl lā Takūnu illā ʿan Ẓann wa-Ittibāʿ Hawā (transl. Principle: Opposing the Messenger Stems Only from Assumption and Following Desire)
- Qāʿidah fī anna al-Īmān wa-al-Tawḥīd Yashtamilu ʿalā Maṣāliḥ al-Dunyā wa-al-Ākhirah (transl. Principle: Faith and Monotheism Encompass the Interests of This World and the Next)
- Qāʿidah fī Ithbāt Karāmāt al-Awliyāʾ (transl. Principle on Affirming the Miracles of the Saints)
- Qāʿidah fī anna Khawāriq al-ʿĀdāt lā Tadullu ʿalā al-Walāyah (transl. Principle: Supernatural Feats Do Not Indicate Sainthood)
- Qāʿidah al-Ṣabr wa-al-Shukr (transl. Principle on Patience and Gratitude)
- Qāʿidah fī al-Riḍā (transl. Principle on Contentment with Divine Decree)
- Qāʿidah fī anna Kull Āyah Yaḥtajj bihā Mubtadiʿ fafīhā Dalīl ʿalā Fasād Qawlih (transl. Principle: Every Verse Cited by an Innovator Contains Evidence of the Corruption of His View)
- Qāʿidah fī anna Kull Dalīl ʿAqlī Yaḥtajj bih Mubtadiʿ fīhi Dalīl ʿalā Buṭlān Qawlih (transl. Principle: Every Rational Argument Cited by an Innovator Contains Evidence of the Falsity of His View)
- Qāʿidah fī Tafḍīl Ṣāliḥī al-Nās ʿalā Sāʾir al-Ajnās (transl. Principle on the Superiority of the Righteous Among Mankind over Other Species)
- Qāʿidah fī al-Khalawāt wa-al-Farq bayna al-Khalwah al-Sharʿiyyah wa-al-Bidʿiyyah (transl. Principle on Seclusion and the Difference Between Lawful and Innovated Retreat)
- Qāʿidah fī Libās al-Khirqah wa-al-Aqṭāb wa-Ghayrhim (transl. Principle on the Wearing of the Sufi Cloak and the Spiritual Poles)
- Qāʿidah fī al-Fuqarāʾ wa-al-Ṣūfiyyah ayyuhum Afḍal (transl. Principle: Who is Superior — the Ascetics or the Sufis?)
- Qāʿidah fī Maḥabbat Allāh li-l-ʿAbd (transl. Principle on God's Love for the Servant)
- Risālah fī al-ʿArsh wa-al-ʿĀlam hal huwa Kurawī al-Shakl am lā (transl. Epistle: Is the Throne and Universe Spherical in Shape or Not?)
- Risālah fī al-Khullah wa-al-Imkān al-ʿĀmm (transl. Epistle on Divine Intimate Friendship and General Possibility)
- Risālah fī Jawāb Muḥyī al-Dīn al-Aṣfahānī (transl. Response to Muḥyī al-Dīn al-Aṣfahānī)
- Qāʿidah fī al-Ikhlāṣ wa-al-Tawakkul (transl. Principle on Sincerity and Reliance upon God)
- Qāʿidah fī al-Shuyūkh al-Aḥmadiyyah (transl. Principle on the Aḥmadī Sufi Shaykhs)
- Qāʿidah fī Taḥrīm al-Samāʿ (transl. Principle on the Prohibition of Music)
- Qāʿidah fī Asmāʾ Allāh al-Ḥusnā (transl. Principle on the Most Beautiful Names of God)
- Qāʿidah fī Qawlih ﷺ "Sataftariqu Ummatī ʿalā Thalāth wa-Sabʿīna Firqah" (transl. Principle on the Hadith: "My Nation Will Split into Seventy-Three Sects")
- Qāʿidah fī al-Istighfār wa-Sharḥih (transl. Principle on Seeking Forgiveness and Its Explanation)
- Qāʿidah fī anna al-Sharīʿah wa-al-Ḥaqīqah Mutalāzimātān (transl. Principle: The Revealed Law and Spiritual Reality Are Inseparable)
- Qāʿidah fī al-Khullah wa-al-Maḥabbah wa-ayyuhumā Afḍal (transl. Principle: Divine Intimate Friendship vs. Love — Which Is Superior?)
- Qāʿidah fī al-ʿIlm al-Muḥkam (transl. Principle on Definitive Knowledge)
- Qawāʿid fī Khilāfat al-Ṣiddīq (transl. Principles on the Caliphate of Abū Bakr al-Ṣiddīq)
- Risālah fī Amr Yazīd hal Yusabbu am lā (transl. Epistle: Should Yazīd Be Cursed or Not?)
- Risālah fī al-Khaḍir hal Māta am huwa Ḥayy (transl. Epistle: Has al-Khaḍir Died or Is He Still Alive?)
- Risālah fī Iḥtijāj al-Jahmiyyah wa-al-Naṣārā bi-al-Kalimah (transl. Epistle on the Jahmites' and Christians' Use of "the Word" as Proof)
- Risālah fīman ʿAzama ʿalā Fiʿl Muḥarram thumma Māta (transl. Epistle: On One Who Intended a Forbidden Act Then Died)
- Risālah fī anna Ismāʿīl ʿalayhi al-Salām huwa al-Dhabīḥ (transl. Epistle: Ismāʿīl Was the One Intended for Sacrifice)
- Risālah fī al-Dhawq wa-al-Wajd alladhī Yadhkuruh al-Ṣūfiyyah (transl. Epistle on the Spiritual Taste and Ecstasy Mentioned by the Sufis)
- Risālah fī Qawlih ﷺ "man Qāla anā Khayrun min Yūnus ibn Mattā faqad Kadhab" (transl. Epistle on the Hadith: "Whoever Claims to Be Better than Jonah Has Lied")
- Risālah fī al-Ishtighāl bi-Kalām Allāh wa-Asmāʾih wa-Dhikrih ayyu dhālika Afḍal (transl. Epistle: Which is Superior — Engaging with God's Speech, His Names, or His Remembrance?)
- Risālah fī Ghaḍḍ al-Baṣar wa-Ḥifẓ al-Farj mādhā Yataʿayyanu ʿalayh (transl. Epistle on Lowering the Gaze and Guarding Chastity — What Is Obligatory?)
- Al-Irbiliyyah (transl. The Irbil Epistle — on divine Establishment and Descent: literal or metaphorical?)
- Risālah fī Masʾalat al-Zawāl wa-Ikhtilāf Waqtih bi-Ikhtilāf al-Buldān (transl. Epistle on the Zenith and the Variation of Its Time by Geographic Location)
- Risālah fī al-Liqāʾ wa-mā Warada fīhi fī al-Qurʾān wa-Ghayrihi (transl. Epistle on the Divine Encounter and Its Mention in the Quran and Elsewhere)
- Risālah fī Qurb al-Rabb min ʿĀbidīhi wa-Dāʿīhi (transl. Epistle on the Lord's Nearness to His Worshippers and Those Who Call Upon Him)
- Fī al-Istiwāʾ wa-Ibṭāl Qawl man Taʾawwalahu bi-al-Istīlāʾ (transl. On Divine Establishment and the Refutation of Those Who Interpret It as Domination — from ~20 angles)
- Risālah fī al-Shahādatayn wa-mā Yatbaʿu dhālik (transl. Epistle on the Two Testimonies of Faith and What Follows Them)
- Risālah fī Inkār ʿIṣmat al-Anbiyāʾ hal hiya min al-Ṣaghāʾir (transl. Epistle: Is Denying Prophetic Infallibility a Minor Sin? Does the Denier Commit Disbelief?)
- Risālah fī al-Istiṭāʿah hal hiya maʿa al-Fiʿl aw Qablah (transl. Epistle: Does Capacity for an Act Exist Simultaneously with It or Before It?)
- Risālah fī al-ʿAyn wa-al-Qalb wa-Aḥwālih (transl. Epistle on the Evil Eye, the Heart, and Its States)
- Risālah hal Kāna al-Nabī ﷺ Qabla al-Risālah Nabiyyan wa-hal Yusammā man Ṣaḥibahu idh dhāka Ṣaḥābiyyan (transl. Epistle: Was the Prophet ﷺ a Prophet Before His Mission? Were His Companions Then Called Companions?)
- Risālah hal Kāna al-Nabī ﷺ Qabla al-Waḥy Mutaʿabbidan bi-Sharʿ man Qablah min al-Anbiyāʾ (transl. Epistle: Was the Prophet Before Revelation Worshipping According to a Prior Prophetic Law?)
- Fī Kufr Firʿawn (transl. On the Disbelief of Pharaoh)
- Risālah fī Dhī al-Faqār hal Kāna Sayf ʿAlī raḍiya Allāh ʿanh (transl. Epistle: Was Dhū al-Faqār the Sword of ʿAlī?)
- Risālah fī Wujūb al-ʿAdl ʿalā Kull Aḥad fī Kull Ḥāl (transl. Epistle on the Obligation of Justice for Everyone in Every Circumstance)
- Risālah fī Faḍl al-Salaf ʿalā al-Khalaf fī al-ʿIlm (transl. Epistle on the Superiority of the Early Scholars over the Later Ones in Knowledge)
- Risālah fī al-Īmān hal Yazīdu wa-Yanquṣ (transl. Epistle: Does Faith Increase and Decrease?)
- Risālah fī Ḥaqq Allāh wa-Ḥaqq Rasūlih wa-Ḥuqūq ʿIbādih (transl. Epistle on the Rights of God, His Messenger, and His Servants)
- Risālah fī anna Mabdaʾ al-ʿIlm al-Ilāhī ʿinda al-Nabī ﷺ huwa al-Waḥy (transl. Epistle: The Source of Divine Knowledge for the Prophet Is Revelation, and for His Followers Is Faith)
- Risālah fī anna Kull Ḥamd wa-Dhamm li-l-Maqālāt wa-al-Afʿāl lā Budda an Yakūna bi-Kitāb Allāh wa-Sunnat Rasūlih (transl. Epistle: All Praise and Blame of Doctrines and Actions Must Be Grounded in the Quran and Sunnah)
- Risālah fī ʿAqīdat al-Ashʿariyyah wa-ʿAqīdat al-Māturīdī wa-Ghayrihi min al-Ḥanafiyyah (transl. Epistle on the Creed of the Ashʿarites and the Māturīdīs and Other Ḥanafīs)
- Qāʿidah fīmā li-Kull Ummah min al-Khaṣāʾiṣ wa-Khaṣāʾiṣ hādhihi al-Ummah (transl. Principle on the Distinctive Features of Each Nation and This Nation's Particulars)
- Qāʿidah fī al-Kulliyyāt (transl. Principle on Universal Propositions)
- Risālah fī al-Farq bayna mā Yataʾawwal wa-mā lā Yataʾawwal min al-Nuṣūṣ (transl. Epistle: Which Texts Admit Allegorical Interpretation and Which Do Not?)
- Qāʿidah fī al-Fanāʾ wa-al-Iṣṭilām (transl. Principle on Annihilation and Spiritual Obliteration)
- Qāʿidah fī al-ʿIlm wa-al-Ḥilm (transl. Principle on Knowledge and Forbearance)
- Qāʿidah fī al-Iqtiṣāṣ min al-Maẓālim bi-al-Duʿāʾ wa-Ghayrihi (transl. Principle on Seeking Recompense for Injustices Through Supplication and Other Means)
- Qāʿidah fī Tazkiyat al-Nufūs (transl. Principle on the Purification of Souls)
- Qāʿidah fī Kalām Ibn al-Sharīf fī al-Taṣawwuf (transl. Principle on Ibn al-Sharīf's Speech on Sufism)
- Qāʿidah fī Ḥaqq Allāh wa-Ḥaqq ʿIbādih (transl. Principle on the Rights of God and the Rights of His Servants)
- Qāʿidah fī al-Zuhd wa-al-Waraʿ (transl. Principle on Asceticism and Scrupulousness)
- Qāʿidah fī al-Īmān wa-al-Tawḥīd wa-Bayān Ḍalāl man Ḍalla fī hādhā al-Aṣl (transl. Principle on Faith, Monotheism, and the Error of Those Who Went Astray in This Foundation)
- Qāʿidah fī Amrāḍ al-Qulūb wa-Shifāʾihā (transl. Principle on the Diseases of Hearts and Their Cures)
- Qāʿidah fī al-Siyāḥah wa-Maʿnāhā fī hādhihi al-Ummah (transl. Principle on Wandering Asceticism and Its Meaning in This Community)
- Qāʿidah fī Khullat Ibrāhīm ʿalayhi al-Salām wa-annahu al-Imām al-Muṭlaq (transl. Principle on Ibrāhīm's Intimate Friendship with God and His Being the Absolute Imam)
- Qāʿidah fīman Imtuḥina fī Allāh wa-Ṣabara (transl. Principle on Those Who Were Tested for God's Sake and Were Patient)
- Risālah fī al-Mubāyanah bayna Allāh wa-bayna Khalqih (transl. Epistle on the Distinction Between God and His Creation)
- Qāʿidah fī al-Ṣafḥ al-Jamīl wa-al-Hajr al-Jamīl wa-al-Ṣabr al-Jamīl (transl. Principle on Gracious Pardon, Gracious Avoidance, and Gracious Patience)
- Qāʿidah fī Iqtirāb al-Īmān bi-al-Iḥtisāb (transl. Principle on Drawing Near to Faith Through Enjoining Right)
- Risālah fī Qawlih "Umirtu an Ukhāṭiba al-Nās ʿalā Qadr ʿUqūlihim" hal huwa min Kalām al-Nabī ﷺ (transl. Epistle: Is "I Was Commanded to Address People According to Their Intellects" a Genuine Prophetic Saying?)
- Qāʿidah fī al-Radd ʿalā Ahl al-Ittiḥād wa-hiya Jawāb al-Ṭūfī (transl. Principle Refuting the Pantheists — Being the Response to al-Ṭūfī)
- Risālah fī Uṣūl al-Dīn li-l-ʿAdawiyyah (transl. Epistle on the Foundations of Religion for the ʿAdawī Community)
- Risālah li-Ahl Qubrus (transl. Epistle to the People of Cyprus — on fundamental religious principles)
- Qāʿidah fīmā Yataʿallaqu bi-al-Wasīlah bi-al-Nabī ﷺ wa-al-Qiyām bi-Ḥuqūqih (transl. Principle on Seeking Means Through the Prophet ﷺ and Fulfilling His Rights)
- Qāʿidah Tataʿallaqu bi-al-Ṣabr al-Maḥmūd wa-al-Madhmūm (transl. Principle on Praiseworthy and Blameworthy Patience)
- Qāʿidah Tataʿallaqu bi-Raḥmat Allāh fī Irsāl Muḥammad ﷺ (transl. Principle on God's Mercy in Sending Muḥammad ﷺ)
- Qāʿidah fī al-Shukr li-Llāh (transl. Principle on Gratitude to God)
- Risālah fī Ḥāl al-Ḥallāj wa-Dafʿ mā Waqaʿa bih al-Tiḥāj (transl. Epistle on the Condition of al-Ḥallāj and Refuting What Was Argued Through Him)
- Qāʿidah fī al-ʿUmrah al-Makkiyyah wa-hal al-Afḍal li-l-Mujāwir wa-Ahl Makkah al-Iʿtimār aw al-Ṭawāf (transl. Principle: For Those Residing in Mecca, Is ʿUmrah or Ṭawāf Superior?)
- Qāʿidah fī al-Kalām ʿalā al-Murshid (transl. Principle on the Spiritual Guide)
- Qāʿidah fī Kalām al-Junayd lammā Suʾila ʿan al-Tawḥīd (transl. Principle on al-Junayd's Statement When Asked About Monotheism)
- Qāʿidah fī al-Tawakkul wa-al-Ikhlāṣ (transl. Principle on Reliance upon God and Sincerity)
- Qāʿidah fī al-Tasbīḥ wa-al-Taḥmīd wa-al-Tahlīl (transl. Principle on Glorification, Praise, and Declaration of God's Oneness)
- Qāʿidah fī anna Allāh Taʿālā innamā Khalaqa al-Khalq li-ʿIbādatih (transl. Principle: God Created Creation Only for His Worship)
- Qāʿidah fī Tawḥīd al-Shahādah (transl. Principle on the Monotheism of Witnessing)
- Al-Qawāʿid al-Khams (transl. The Five Principles)
- Qāʿidah fī al-Qadariyyah wa-annahum Thalāthat Aqsām (transl. Principle: The Qadarites Are of Three Categories — Majūsī, Polytheist, and Iblīsī)
- Qāʿidah fī Bayān Ṭarīqat al-Qurʾān fī al-Daʿwah wa-al-Hidāyah al-Nabawiyyah (transl. Principle on the Quranic Method of Calling and Prophetic Guidance, and Its Difference from the Theological and Sufi Methods)
- Qāʿidah fī Waṣiyyat Luqmān li-Ibnih (transl. Principle on Luqmān's Counsel to His Son)
- Qāʿidah fī Tasbīḥ al-Makhlūqāt min al-Jamādāt wa-Ghayrihi hal huwa bi-Lisān al-Ḥāl am lā (transl. Principle: Is the Glorification of Inanimate Creatures by State or by Actual Speech?)
- Qāʿidah fī al-Siyāḥah wa-al-ʿUzlah wa-fī al-Faqr wa-al-Taṣawwuf wa-hal humā Ismān Sharʿiyyān (transl. Principle on Ascetic Wandering, Seclusion, Poverty, and Sufism — Are These Legitimate Terms?)
- Qāʿidah fī Mashāyikh al-ʿIlm wa-Mashāyikh al-Fuqarāʾ ayyuhum Afḍal (transl. Principle: Who Is Superior — Shaykhs of Knowledge or Shaykhs of the Ascetics?)
- Qāʿidah fī Taʿdhīb al-Marʾ bi-Dhanb Ghayrihi (transl. Principle on Punishing a Person for Another's Sin)
- Risālah fī al-ʿAbbās wa-Bilāl ayyuhumā Afḍal (transl. Epistle: Who Is Superior — al-ʿAbbās or Bilāl?)
- Qāʿidah fī anna Jāmiʿ al-Ḥasanāt al-ʿAdl wa-al-Sayyi'āt al-Ẓulm (transl. Principle: The Sum of Good is Justice and the Sum of Evil is Injustice)
- Qāʿidah fī Faḍl ʿAshr Dhī al-Ḥijjah (transl. Principle on the Virtues of the First Ten Days of Dhū al-Ḥijjah)
- Qāʿidah fī Risālat al-Nabī ﷺ ilā al-Ins wa-al-Jinn (transl. Principle: The Messenger's Mission to Humankind and Jinn)
- Qāʿidah fī Rujūʿ al-Bidaʿ ilā Shuʿbah min Shuʿab al-Kufr (transl. Principle: All Innovations Trace Back to a Branch of Disbelief)
- Qāʿidah fī al-Ijmāʿ wa-lahu Thalāthat Aqsām (transl. Principle on Scholarly Consensus and Its Three Categories)
- Risālah fīman Qāla inna Baʿḍ al-Mashāyikh Aḥyā Mayyitan (transl. Epistle on the Claim That Certain Shaykhs Revived the Dead)
- Qāʿidah fīmā Yuẓann min Taʿāruḍ al-Naṣṣ wa-al-Ijmāʿ (transl. Principle on the Apparent Conflict Between Textual Evidence and Scholarly Consensus)
- Qawāʿid fī Rujūʿ al-Maghrūr ʿalā man Gharrah (transl. Principles on the Deceived Party Seeking Redress from the Deceiver)
- Qawāʿid fī al-Sunnah wa-al-Bidʿah wa-fī anna Kull Bidʿah Ḍalālah (transl. Principles on Sunnah and Innovation, and That Every Innovation Is Misguidance)
- Risālah fī Faḍāʾil al-Aʾimmah al-Arbaʿah (transl. Epistle on the Merits of the Four Imams and the Distinctive Excellence of Each)
- Qāʿidah fī Miqdār al-Kaffārah fī al-Yamīn (transl. Principle on the Amount of Expiation for Oath-Breaking)
- Qāʿidah fī Lafẓ al-Ḥaqīqah wa-al-Majāz wa-al-Baḥth maʿa al-Āmidī (transl. Principle on the Terms "Literal" and "Figurative" — a Debate with al-Āmidī)
- Risālah fī Dhabāʾiḥ Ahl al-Kitāb (transl. Epistle on the Permissibility of the Slaughter of the People of the Book)
- Risālah fī Qawlihi Taʿālā ﴿wa-an Laysa li-l-Insān illā mā Saʿā﴾ (transl. Epistle on: "And that man shall have nothing but what he strives for")
- Risālah fī Ihdāʾ al-Thawāb li-l-Nabī ﷺ (transl. Epistle on Dedicating Reward to the Prophet)
- Risālah fī Qawlihi "kamā Ṣallayta ʿalā Ibrāhīm" wa-fī anna al-Mushabbah bih Aʿlā min al-Mushabbah (transl. Epistle on "As You Blessed Ibrāhīm" and That the Object of Comparison Is Superior to the Subject)
- Risālah Ajwibat Masāʾil Aṣfahān (transl. Responses to the Questions of Aṣfahān)
- Risālah Ajwibat Masāʾil al-Andalus (transl. Responses to the Questions of al-Andalus)
- Risālah Jawāb Suʾāl al-Raḥbah (transl. Response to the Question of al-Raḥbah)
- Risālah Ajwibat Masāʾil al-Salt (transl. Responses to the Questions of al-Salt)
- Risālah fī Arḍ al-Mawāt idhā Aḥyāhā thumma ʿādat hal Tumlak Marratan Ukhrā (transl. Epistle: If Dead Land Is Revived Then Returns to Desolation, Can It Be Owned Again?)
- Risālah fī al-Nahy ʿan Aʿyād al-Naṣārā (transl. Epistle on the Prohibition of Participating in Christian Festivals)
- Qawāʿid fī Taṭahhur al-Arḍ bi-al-Shams wa-al-Rīḥ (transl. Principles on the Purification of the Earth by Sunlight and Wind)
- Qawāʿid fī Masāʾil min al-Nudhūr wa-al-Ḍamān (transl. Principles on Questions of Vows and Guarantees)
- Qāʿidah fī al-Māʾiʿāt wa-al-Maytah idhā Waqaʿat fīhā (transl. Principle on Liquids and a Carcass That Falls into Them)
- Qawāʿid fī al-Waqf wa-Shurūṭ al-Waqf wa-fī Ibdālih bi-Ajwad minh wa-fī Bayʿih ʿinda Taʿadhdhuhr al-Intifāʿ (transl. Principles on Endowments, Their Conditions, Their Exchange for Superior Ones, and Their Sale When Benefit Becomes Impossible)
- Qāʿidah fī Tafḍīl Madhhab Aḥmad wa-Dhikr Maḥāsinih (transl. Principle on the Excellence of the Ḥanbalī Madhhab and Its Merits)
- Qāʿidah fī anna Jins Fiʿl al-Maʾmūr bih Afḍal min Jins Tark al-Manhī ʿanh (transl. Principle: The Category of Performing a Commanded Act Is Superior to the Category of Abandoning a Forbidden One)
- Qāʿidah fī Ṭahārat Bawl mā Yuʾkal Laḥmuh (transl. Principle on the Ritual Purity of the Urine of Edible Animals — from ~30 proofs)
- Qāʿidah fī Muʿāhadat al-Kuffār al-Muṭlaqah wa-al-Muqayyadah (transl. Principle on Unrestricted and Restricted Treaties with Non-Muslims)
- Qāʿidah fī Dam al-Shahīd wa-Midād al-ʿUlamāʾ (transl. Principle: The Blood of Martyrs and the Ink of Scholars)
- Qāʿidah fī Wujūb al-Tasmiyah ʿalā al-Dhabāʾiḥ wa-al-Ṣayd (transl. Principle on the Obligation of Pronouncing God's Name over Slaughter and Hunting)
- Qāʿidah fī anna Kull ʿAmal Ṣāliḥ Aṣluh Ittibāʿ al-Nabī ﷺ (transl. Principle: Every Righteous Deed Has Its Root in Following the Prophet)
- Qāʿidah fī Tafḍīl Madhhab Ahl al-Madīnah (transl. Principle on the Excellence of the School of the People of Medina)
- Qāʿidah fī Nawāqiḍ al-Wuḍūʾ (transl. Principle on the Nullifiers of Ritual Purification)
- Qāʿidah fī al-Ijtihād wa-al-Taqlīd (transl. Principle on Independent Reasoning and Following a Legal School)
- Qāʿidah fī al-Jihād wa-al-Targhīb fīhi (transl. Principle on Jihad and Encouragement Toward It)
- Qāʿidah fī al-Mukhṭiʾ fī al-Ijtihād hal Yaʾtham wa-hal al-Muṣīb Wāḥid (transl. Principle: Is the One Who Errs in Ijtihād Sinful? And Is There Only One Correct View?)
- Qāʿidah fīmā Yaḥillu wa-Yaḥrumu min al-Aṭʿimah (transl. Principle on Permissible and Forbidden Foods)
- Qāʿidah fīmā Sharaʿahu Allāh bi-Lafẓ al-ʿUmūm wa-hal Yakūn Mashrūʿan bi-Lafẓ al-Khuṣūṣ (transl. Principle: What God Legislated in General Terms — Can It Be Performed in Particular Forms?)
- Qāʿidah fī Laʿib al-Shaṭranj (transl. Principle on Playing Chess)
- Qāʿidah fī Mufṭirāt al-Ṣāʾim (transl. Principle on the Things That Break the Fast)
- Qāʿidah fī al-Safar alladhī Yajūzu fīhi al-Qaṣr wa-al-Fiṭr (transl. Principle on the Journey That Permits Shortening Prayer and Breaking the Fast)
- Qāʿidah fī al-Jamʿ bayna al-Ṣalātayn (transl. Principle on Combining Two Prayers)
- Qāʿidah fīmā Yushtaraṭu lahu al-Ṭahārah (transl. Principle on What Requires Ritual Purity)
- Qāʿidah fī Mawāqīt al-Ṣalāh (transl. Principle on the Prayer Times)
- Qāʿidah fī al-Kanāʾis wa-mā Yajūzu Hadmuh minhā (transl. Principle on Churches and Which of Them May Be Demolished)
- Qāʿidah Shumūl al-Nuṣūṣ fī al-Farāʾiḍ (transl. Principle on the Comprehensiveness of Texts in Inheritance Law)
- Qāʿidah fī Taqlīd Madhhab Muʿayyan hal Yajibu ʿalā al-ʿĀmmī am lā (transl. Principle: Must the Layperson Follow a Specific Legal School?)
- Qāʿidah fī Ḥalq al-Raʾs hal Yajūzu fī Ghayr al-Nusk (transl. Principle: Is Shaving the Head Permissible Outside of Ritual?)
- Qāʿidah fīmā Yaḥillu wa-Yaḥrumu bi-al-Nasab wa-al-Ṣihr wa-al-Raḍāʿ (transl. Principle on What Is Permissible and Forbidden by Lineage, Marriage, and Suckling)
- Qāʿidah fī al-Jadd hal Yujbiru al-Bikr ʿalā al-Nikāḥ (transl. Principle: Can the Paternal Grandfather Force a Virgin into Marriage?)
- Qāʿidah fī al-Jahr wa-al-Basmalah (transl. Principle on Reciting Aloud and the Basmalah)
- Qāʿidah fī al-Qirāʾah Khalf al-Imām (transl. Principle on Reciting Behind the Imam)
- Qāʿidah fīman Bakkara wa-Ibtakara wa-Ghassala wa-Ightasala (transl. Principle on the Ḥadīth of Coming Early to Friday Prayer, Bathing, and Washing)
- Qāʿidah fī Dhamm al-Waswās (transl. Principle on Condemning Obsessive Doubt in Worship)
- Qāʿidah fī al-Anbidhah wa-al-Muskīrāt (transl. Principle on Fermented Drinks and Intoxicants)
- Qāʿidah fī Qawlih ﷺ "Istaḥlaltum Furūjahunna bi-Kalimat Allāh" (transl. Principle on the Hadith: "You Made Their Private Parts Lawful Through the Word of God")
- Qāʿidah fī al-Ḥisbah (transl. Principle on Commanding Right and Forbidding Wrong — Ḥisbah)
- Qāʿidah fī al-Masʾalah al-Surūjiyyah (transl. Principle on the al-Surūjī Question)
- Qāʿidah fī Ḥall al-Dawr wa-Masāʾil al-Jabr wa-al-Muqābalah (transl. Principle on Resolving the Circular Argument and Questions of Algebra)

== Epistles and Counsels ==
- Waṣiyyah li-Ibn al-Muhājirī (transl. Counsel for Ibn al-Muhājirī)
- Waṣiyyah li-al-Tujībī (transl. Counsel for al-Tujībī)
- Waṣiyyah li-Abī al-Qāsim al-Sabtī (transl. Counsel for Abū al-Qāsim al-Sabtī)
- Al-Risālah al-Madaniyyah (transl. The Medinan Epistle)
- Al-Risālah al-Miṣriyyah (transl. The Egyptian Epistle)
- Risālah katabahaā ilā Ahl Baghdād (transl. Epistle Written to the People of Baghdad)
- Risālah ilā Ahl al-Baṣrah (transl. Epistle to the People of Basra)
- Risālah katabahā ilā al-Qāḍī al-Sarūjī al-Ḥanafī (transl. Epistle to the Ḥanafī Judge al-Sarūjī)
- Al-Risālah al-ʿAdawiyyah katabahā ilā Bayt al-Shaykh ʿAdī ibn Musāfir (transl. The ʿAdawī Epistle — Written to the Household of Shaykh ʿAdī ibn Musāfir)
- Risālah katabahā ilā Bayt al-Shaykh Jākīr (transl. Epistle Written to the Household of Shaykh Jākīr)
- Risālah katabahā ilā Ṣāḥib Qubrus fī Maṣāliḥ Tataʿallaqu bi-al-Muslimīn (transl. Epistle Written to the Ruler of Cyprus on Muslim Interests)
- Risālah ilā al-Baḥrayn wa-Mulūk al-ʿArab (transl. Epistle to Bahrain and the Arab Rulers)
- Risālah li-Ahl al-ʿIrāq (transl. Epistle to the People of Iraq)
- Risālah ilā Malik Miṣr (transl. Epistle to the Sultan of Egypt)
- Risālah ilā Malik Ḥamāh (transl. Epistle to the Ruler of Hama)
- Risālat Taksīr al-Aḥjār (transl. The Stone-Breaking Epistle)
- Risālah fī al-Masʾalah al-Ḥarfiyyah (transl. Epistle on the Question of Letters)
- Risālah fī Ithbāt Wujūd al-Nafs baʿda al-Mawt (transl. Epistle on Affirming the Existence of the Soul After Death)
- Risālah fī ʿArḍ al-Adyān ʿinda al-Mawt (transl. Epistle on the Presentation of Religions at the Moment of Death)
- Risālah fī al-Mufāḍalah bayna al-Ghanī al-Shākir wa-al-Faqīr al-Ṣābir (transl. Epistle on Who Is Superior — the Grateful Wealthy Person or the Patient Poor Person)
