= The Great Compilation of Fatwa =

Book by Ahmad ibn Tajmijja

Majmu' al-Fatawa is a book that compiles the fatwas of Ibn Taymiyyah. It contains numerous books on creed, monotheism in Islam, Islamic jurisprudence, principles of Islamic jurisprudence, prophetic hadith, interpretation, and other sciences. It was written in 37 original volumes and printed in 20 volumes.

== Volumes ==
1. Volume One: Tawhid al-Uluhiyyah, (405) pages.
2. Volume Two: Tawhid al-Rububiyyah, (524) pages.
3. Volume Three: The Summary of the Beliefs of the Salaf, (471) pages.
4. Volume Four: Mufassal al-I'tiqad, (579) pages.
5. Volume Five: Tawhid al-Asma' wa'l-Sifat, (607) pages.
6. Volume Six: Tawhid al-Asma' wa al-Sifat (Oneness of Names and Attributes), (627) pages.
7. Volume Seven: Faith, (708) pages.
8. Volume Eight: Fate, (572) pages.
9. Volume Nine: Logic, (336) pages.
10. Volume Ten: The Science of Behavior, (793) pages.
11. Volume Eleven: Sufism, (728) pages.
12. Volume Twelve: The Qur'an is the Word of God, (621) pages.
13. Volume Thirteen: Introduction to Interpretation, (445) pages.
14. Volume Fourteen: Interpretation - From Surat al-Fatihah to Surat al-A'raf, (521) pages.
15. Volume Fifteen: Interpretation - From Surat al-A'raf to Surat al-Zumar, (470) pages.
16. Volume Sixteen: Interpretation - From Surat al-Zumar to Surat al-Ikhlas, (620) pages.
17. Volume Seventeen: Interpretation - From Surat Al-Ikhlas and Al-Mu'awwidhat, (549) pages.
18. Volume Eighteen: Hadith, (406) pages.
19. Volume Nineteen: Principles of Jurisprudence - Following, (328) pages.
20. Volume Twentieth: Principles of Jurisprudence - School of Thought, (614) pages.
21. Volume Twenty-One: Jurisprudence - Purification, (670) pages.
22. Volume Twenty-Two: Jurisprudence - Prayer, (656) pages.
23. Volume Twenty-Three: Jurisprudence - From Prostration of Forgetfulness to the Prayer of Those with Excuses, (435) pages.
24. Volume Twenty-Four: Jurisprudence - From the Prayer of Those with Excuses to Zakat, (400) pages.
25. Volume Twenty-Five: Jurisprudence - Zakat and Fasting, (350) pages.
26. Volume Twenty-Six: Jurisprudence - Hajj, (325) pages.
27. Volume Twenty-Seven: Jurisprudence - Visitation, (527) pages.
28. Volume Twenty-Eight: Jurisprudence - Jihad, (695) pages.
29. Volume Twenty-Nine: Jurisprudence - Sales, (590) pages.
30. Volume Thirty: Reconciliation to Endowment, (462) pages.
31. Volume Thirty-One: Endowment to Marriage, (416) pages.
32. Volume Thirty-Two: Marriage, (393) pages.
33. Volume Thirty-Three: Divorce, (263) pages.
34. Volume Thirty-Four: Zihar to Fighting the Rebels, (271) pages.
35. Volume Thirty-Five: Fighting the Rebels to Confession, (478) pages.
36. Volume Thirty-Six: General Indexes and Approximation, (468) pages.
37. Volume Thirty-Seven: General Indexes and Approximation, (512) pages.

== Books related to Majmu' Fatawa ==
1. Al-Mustadrak ala Majmu' Fatawa, compiled by Sheikh Muhammad ibn Abd al-Rahman ibn Qasim in five volumes.
2. Collection of Fatwas Ibn Taymiyyah, compiled by Faraj Allah al-Kurdi, and from it, Al-Fatawa al-Kubra, edited by the sons of Abdul-Qadir Atta
3. Al-Fatawa al-Iraqiya, edited by Abdullah Abd al-Samad al-Mufti.
4. Lights from the Fatwas of Sheikh al-Islam Ibn Taymiyyah - Section on Creed - by Sheikh Saleh ibn Fawzan al-Fawzan, printed in two volumes, published by Dar Ibn al-Jawzi in Dammam.
5. Al-Hawi fi Takhreej Ahadith Majmu' al-Fatawa, edited by Majdi bin Mansour bin Sayyid al-Shura, published by Dar al-Kutub al-Ilmiyyah in one volume.
6. Takhreej Ahadith Majmu' al-Fatawa, edited by Marwan Kujak and reviewed by Fathi al-Jundi, published by Dar Ibn Hazm in Beirut in six volumes.
7. Preservation of Majmu' al-Fatawa from Omissions and Misprints by Sheikh Nasser al-Fahd, published by Dar Adwa' al-Salaf in Riyadh. # A collection of questions by Sheikh Al-Islam Ibn Taymiyyah in his two books, Majmu' Al-Fatawa and Al-Fatawa Al-Kubra, arranged according to the chapters of jurisprudence, compiled by Abdul Karim Al-Ghanim, published by Dar Al-Manar.

== Editions of the book ==
1. Edition of the King Fahd Complex in Al-Madinah Al-Nabawiyyah in 37 volumes with indexes, photocopied from the original edition of the book, compiled by Sheikh Abdul-Rahman bin Muhammad bin Qasim Al-Asimi and his son Muhammad, and it is the approved one. # Edition Dar Ibn Hazm and Dar Al-Wafa in Egypt, edited by Amer Al-Jazzar and Anwar Al-Baz, in twenty volumes with indexes.

3. Edition by Dar Al-Safwa in seven large volumes, considered the best in terms of text and hadith verification.
