= Ibn Muflih =

Islamic scholar

Shams al-Din Muhammad ibn Muflih al-Maqdisi
- شمس الدين محمد بن مفلح المقدسي

Personal life
- Born: 708 AH (1308/1309 CE) c. 1308 CE Palestine
- Died: 763 AH (1361/1362 CE) c. 1362 CE Syria, Damascus, Al-Salihiyyah
- Region: Syrian scholar
- Main interest(s): Fiqh

Religious life
- Religion: Islam
- Jurisprudence: Hanbali
- Creed: Athari

Muslim leader
- Influenced by: Ibn Taymiyya, Al-Mizzi, Al-Dhahabi, Ibn al-Qayyim

Ibn Mufliḥ al-Maqdisī, in full "Shams al-Din Abu Abd Allah Muhammad ibn Muflih ibn Muhammad ibn Mufarraj al-Ramini al-Maqdisi" (710-763 AH/1310-1362 CE), was one of the leading authorities in Hanbali Law and one of the most prolific writers of the Ḥanbalī school of his period. He is a jurisconsult who stands at the head of a large family of jurisconsults, who survived until the seventeenth century. He received his tutelage amongst several prominent Hanbali figures, including Ibn Taymiyya.

Ibn Muflih married the daughter of the Hanbalis Qadi al-Qudat Jamāl al-Dīn al-Mardāwī (700-769/1300-1367) and had seven children from this marriage, five boys and two girls.

The similarity of some names amongst the descendants of Ibn Muflih is liable to lead to confusion, especially as regards those named Burhān al-Dīn Ibrāhīm, of whom there are five.

After a life of writing and teaching in Damascus in three Hanbali madrasas, al-D̲j̲awziyya, al-Ṣāḥibiyya and al-ʿUmariyya, he died in 763/1362.

== Works ==
He gave particular attention to the juristic preferences of Ibn Taymiyah. His extant works have preserved much that has been lost of earlier Ḥanbali works, notably his Ādāb s̲h̲arʿīyya (3 volumes, Cairo 1348/1930), which contains many excerpts of Kitāb al-Funūn of Ibn Aqil. His work on legal methodology, Kitāb Uṣūl al-fiḳh. Kitāb al-Furūʿ (3 volumes, 1339/1921) is one of the most important Hanbalī works for the establishment of the true legal doctrine of Ahmad ibn Hanbal.

- Usool al-Fiqh li-Ibn Muflih
