= Cüneyt =

Cüneyt (Turkish pronunciation: [dʒyˈnejt]) is the Turkish spelling of Arabic masculine given name Junayd (Arabic: جُنَيْد junayd) meaning "soldier, warrior".

People named Cüneyt include:

- Cüneyt Arkın (1937–2022), Turkish film actor
- Cüneyt Bey of Aydın (fl. 1402–1425), Turkish bey
- Cüneyt Çakır (born 1976), Turkish football referee
- Cüneyt Erden (born 1977), Turkish professional basketball player
- Cüneyt Köz (born 1992), Turkish footballer
- Cüneyt Özdemir (born 1970), Turkish journalist
- Cüneyt Tanman (born 1956), Turkish footballer

== See also ==
- Junayd
