= Al-Aqidah Al-Waasitiyyah =

Sunni Islamic creed book

Al-Aqidah Al-Waasitiyyah (Arabic: العقيدة الواسطية) is a book of Islamic creed written by the Hanbali jurist Taqi al-Din ibn Taymiyyah in the year 1297 CE, during the reign of Ghazan, in request of Shafii scholar Radhi al-Din Wasiti, to remove the influence of Yassa creed by neo-Muslim Tatars among Muslims. It is considered relatively easy to understand compared to Ibn Taymiyyah's other works on creed.

== Background ==
He explained his purpose for writing it as follows:

This is the reason I wrote it: A man approached me from the land of Wāsiṭ, one of the judges of its regions, a Sheikh named Raḍī al-Dīn al-Wāsiṭī, who was a scholar of Shāfi’ī school. He approached us during the Hajj pilgrimage and he was among the people of virtue and religion. He complained of the people among him in that land under the Tartar government, of the prevalence of ignorance and oppression, the loss of religion and knowledge. He asked me to write a creed for him that he and his household could rely upon. I abstained from that and I said, ‘People have written a number of credal texts, so take one of the creeds written by the Imams of the Sunnah.’ He persisted in asking and he said, ‘I would like no one but you to write it.’ So I wrote this creed for him while I was sitting after midday, and many copies of it have been distributed in Egypt, Iraq, and elsewhere.

== Topics ==
- The fundamental beliefs of Ahlus-Sunnah wal-Jama'ah regarding the Names and Attributes of Allah.
- The fundamental beliefs of Ahlus-Sunnah wal-Jama'ah regarding Faith.
- The fundamental beliefs of Ahlus-Sunnah regarding the Names and Rulings of Allah and the Chapter on Allah's Threat.
- The fundamental beliefs of Ahlus-Sunnah wal-Jama'ah regarding Divine Decree.
- The fundamental beliefs of Ahlus-Sunnah wal-Jama'ah regarding the Hereafter, what it entails, and what will occur on it, such as the Reckoning, Intercession, the Scales, Paradise, and Hellfire.
- Their fundamental beliefs regarding miracles.
- The fundamental beliefs of Ahlus-Sunnah wal-Jama'ah regarding their stance on rulers and governors.
- The fundamental beliefs of Ahlus-Sunnah wal-Jama'ah regarding the Companions of the Prophet and their stance on them.
- The fundamental beliefs of Ahlus-Sunnah wal-Jama'ah regarding the sources of knowledge.
- The fundamental beliefs of Ahlus-Sunnah wal-Jama'ah regarding ethics, conduct, enjoining good and forbidding evil.
- The fundamental beliefs of Ahlus-Sunnah wal-Jama'ah regarding Jihad and the establishment of outward religious rites.
- The treatise concludes with a discussion of the different categories and types of Ahlus-Sunnah wal-Jama'ah.

A number of scholars have addressed this topic, including Muhammad ibn Salih al-Uthaymeen.

== Explanations ==
- The System of Al-Aqidah Al-Wasitiyyah: by Ibn Adwan Al-Ruzayni
- Al-Tanbihat Al-Sunniyyah: An Explanation of Al-Aqidah Al-Wasitiyyah by Abdul Aziz Al-Rashid
- Explanation of Al-Aqidah Al-Wasitiyyah by Sheikh Muhammad Khalil Harras, edited by Alawi Al-Saqqaf
- Explanation of Al-Aqidah Al-Wasitiyyah by Muhammad ibn Salih Al-Uthaymin
- Explanation of Al-Aqidah Al-Wasitiyyah by Abdul-Muhsin Al-Qasim
- Explanation of Al-Aqidah Al-Wasitiyyah by Abdul Rahman Al-Barrak
- Explanation of Al-Aqidah Al-Wasitiyyah by Yusuf Al-Ghafis
- Explanation of Al-Aqidah Al-Wasitiyyah by Muhammad ibn Ibrahim Al-Sheikh, edited by Abdul-Muhsin Al-Qasim
- Al-La’ali’ Al-Bahiyyah: An Explanation of Al-Aqidah Al-Wasitiyyah by Salih Al-Sheikh
- Explanation of Al-Aqeedah Al-Wasitiyyah by Saeed bin Wahf Al-Qahtani

== See also ==
- List of Sunni books
- Wasat (Islamic term)
