= As-Sarim al-Maslul 'ala Shatim ar-Rasul =

Written response by Ibn Taymiyyah

As-Sarim al-Maslul 'ala Shatim ar-Rasul means The Drawn Sword against those who insult the Messenger (Arabic: الصارم المسلول على شاتم الرسول) is a book of Islamic creed written by Ibn Taymiyyah. It is written in response to an incident in which Ibn Taymiyyah heard a Christian insulting the Islamic prophet Muhammad in 1294.

In 1293 Ibn Taymiyyah was asked by the authorities to issue a fatwa (legal verdict) on Assaf al-Nasrani, a Christian cleric accused of insulting Muhammad. He accepted the invitation and delivered his fatwa, calling for the man to receive the death penalty. Despite the fact that public opinion was very much on Ibn Taymiyyah's side, the Governor of Syria attempted to resolve the situation by asking Assaf to accept Islam in return for his life, to which he agreed. This resolution was not acceptable to Ibn Taymiyyah who then, together with his followers, protested outside the governor's palace demanding Assaf be put to death, on the grounds that any person—Muslim or non-Muslim—who insults Muhammad must be killed. This unwillingness to compromise coupled with his attempt to protest against the governor's actions, resulted in him being punished with a prison sentence, the first of many such imprisonments to come. During this incarceration Ibn Taymiyyah "wrote his first great work, al-Ṣārim al-maslūl ʿalā s̲h̲ātim al-Rasūl (The Drawn Sword against those who insult the Messenger)." Ibn Taymiyyah, together with the help of his disciples, continued with his efforts against what, "he perceived to be un-Islamic practices" and to implement what he saw as his religious duty of commanding good and forbidding wrong.

== See also ==
- List of Sunni books
