= Farhad Ahmed Dockrat =

South African cleric and businessman accused of terrorist links

Farhad Ahmed Dockrat (born February 28, 1959) is a South African cleric and businessman who, in January 2007 was listed by the UN Security Council as a terror suspect along with his cousin Junaid Ismail Dockrat for alleged links with the terrorist organization Al-Qaeda. This was at the request of the United States government who describe he and Dr Junaid Ismail Dockrat as being terrorism "facilitator(s) and terrorist financier(s)". He currently resides in Erasmia, near Pretoria. The South African Government has requested proof that he and his cousin are indeed involved with Al-Qaeda, but the pair deny the claims, with Farhad saying "I have never paid any money to Al-Qaeda in my life. If one is Muslim and had Muslim concerns at heart, then one is considered a terrorist by the US."
