= Muctar Yunos Junaid =

Filipino politician

Muctar "Pusong" Yunos Junaid (LKS-KAM) is a Filipino politician and current mayor of Tabuan-Lasa in Basilan (2010–13).
