= Abu Talib al-Makki =

Muslim scholar and mystic (died 996)

Personal life
- Born: Abu Talib Muhammad ibn Ali al-Makki; Early 3rd AH / 9th AD centuries Jibal, Abbasid Caliphate
- Died: 386 AH / 996 AD Baghdad, Abbasid Caliphate
- Main interest(s): Hadith, Sufism, Islamic Jurisprudence
- Notable idea: Ma'rifa (Knowledge of Hearts)
- Notable work: Qut al-Qulub (The Sustenance of Hearts)

Religious life
- Religion: Islam
- Denomination: Sufi
- Creed: Shafi'i

Senior posting
- Influenced by: Abu Sa'id ibn al-Arabi, Junayd of Baghdad
- Influenced: Al-Ghazali

Abu Talib Muhammad ibn Ali al-Makki (Arabic: أبو طالب المكي; died 386 AH/996 AD in Baghdad), was a hadith scholar, Shafi'i jurist, and Sufi mystic.

== Biography ==
He was born in the Abbasid province of Jibal in the early 3rd AH / 9th AD centuries. Al-Makki grew up in Mecca, where he was educated in hadith and the Qur’an by the city's traditionalist circles. Abu Sa’id ibn al-Arabi (d. 341 AH/952-3 AD), a student of the sober Sufi Mystic, Junayd of Baghdad, was one of Al-Makki's early traditionalist teachers. Al-Makki moved to Basra in 341 AH, and continued his studies alongside various Sufis before seeking permanent refuge in Baghdad. Al-Makki remained an intense ascetic throughout his life, and was known in Baghdad for his strict dietary regimens. From an early age Makki was weary of “personal judgment and analogical reasoning,” and favored using weak hadith literature to support his interpretations of sacred texts when strong hadith failed. He had a son, Umar Ibn Muhammad ibn ‘Ali (d. 444/ 1053).

== The Sustenance of Hearts ==
Al-Makki's most influential work, "Qut al-qulub fi mu'amalat al-mahbub wa wasf tariq al-murid ila maqam al-tawhid", or “The Sustenance of Hearts,” is a systematic exploration of Sufism and the ‘knowledge of hearts’. This knowledge, known as Ma'rifa, is accessible through inward and outward deeds of devotion to God. Al-Makki uses his intimate knowledge of hadith and the Qur'an to argue that Ma'rifa is the only true form of knowledge available to Muslims. In “The Sustenance of Hearts,” he interprets the Prophet's saying, “The quest for knowledge is a duty,” through the five pillars of Islam, as a divine assertion that the sciences of the heart have transcendent value. He outlines at length the elements of a wholly pious life- one informed by the sciences of the heart- and disparages the ‘knowledge of tongues.’ This refers to any form of knowledge that can be used for social and economic benefit. Al-Makki's focused attack on this form of knowledge was likely influenced by the careerism of religious specialities that accompanied Islam's expansion. In part because of his feelings towards the ‘knowledge of tongues’, Al-Makki has been compared to the early renunciants and People of The Blame. These severe ascetics disdained similarly selfish and innovative practitioners of Islam. Al-Ghazali used this book as a source for some of the chapters of his magnum opus Ihya' 'Ulum al-Din (The Revival of the Religious Sciences).
