= Minhaj al-Sunnah al-Nabawiyyah =

Refutation book of Shia creed by Ibn Taymiyya

Minhaj as-Sunnah an-Nabawiyyah (Arabic: منهاج السنة النبوية) is a work by Ibn Taymiyyah. It was written as a refutation of a book by the Shi'ite Twelver theologian Al-Hilli titled Minhaj al-Karamah.
