= Junaid Muhammad Junaid =

Yemeni poet (born 1955)

Junaid Muhammad Junaid (born 1955) is a Yemeni poet. He worked as a teacher in Aden. His first book of poetry was called A Garland for a Qaitbani Woman. His poem "Identity for a Prophetic Body" was translated into English and included in a 1988 anthology on modern Arabian literature.
