= Henri Laoust =

- Born: Henri Ernest Émile Laoust; April 1, 1905; Fresnes-sur-Escaut
- Died: November 12, 1983; Rognes
- Education: École normale supérieure

Henri Laoust (1 April 1905 – 12 November 1983) was a French Orientalist. He is known for his work on the Hanbali school of thought and schisms within Islam.

== Biography ==
Laoust was born on Saturday, 1 April 1905 in Fresnes-sur-Escaut, France. He undertook part of his secondary education in Gouraud high school in Rabat, Morocco, where his father was director of the Institute for Advanced Moroccan Studies. Laoust finished his secondary education at the Lycée Louis-le-Grand, a prestigious public secondary school in France.

== Works ==
According to Sheikh Ali Hasan al-Halabi, a prominent student of the Hadith scholar Al-Albani, the foundational book of creed "al-Sharh wa al-Ibanatu as-Sughra," written by Hanbali scholar Ibn Battah, printed in 2009, was first brought out and published from manuscript over half a century ago by Henri Laoust in Damascus in 1954.
