= Junaid Ismail Dockrat =

South African dentist

- Born: 16 March 1971 (age 55); Johannesburg, South Africa
- Occupation: Dentist
- Known for: U.S. Treasury terrorist designation (2007)
- Relatives: Farhad Ahmed Dockrat (cousin)

Junaid Ismail Dockrat (born 16 March 1971) is a South African dentist based in Mayfair, Johannesburg. In January 2007, he and his cousin, Farhad Ahmed Dockrat, were designated as Specially Designated Global Terrorists by the United States Department of the Treasury for alleged financial and logistical support to Al-Qaeda.

== Allegations and U.S. designation ==
On 26 January 2007, the Office of Foreign Assets Control (OFAC) of the United States Department of the Treasury placed Junaid Dockrat and Farhad Dockrat on its Specially Designated Nationals and Blocked Persons List under Executive Order 13224.

According to the U.S. Treasury, Junaid Dockrat acted as an Al-Qaeda facilitator, recruiter, and financier. The U.S. government alleged that in 2004, Dockrat collaborated via telephone and email with Abu Hamza Rabia, a senior Al-Qaeda operations chief, to facilitate the travel of South African recruits to Pakistan for military training at Al-Qaeda camps. The U.S. Treasury further alleged that Dockrat raised approximately US$120,000 for Rabia in early 2004.

The United States government subsequently submitted a proposal to the United Nations Security Council Al-Qaida Sanctions Committee to list both cousins internationally.

== Response and South African position ==
Junaid Dockrat and his cousin denied all allegations, maintaining that they had no links to Al-Qaeda or any terrorist organizations and threatening legal action to clear their names. Dockrat described the allegations as "patently false and devoid of any merit".

The South African government initially placed a hold on the proposed United Nations Security Council listing, requesting that U.S. authorities provide concrete evidence supporting the claims before taking international action.
