= Ritha' al-Andalus =

Poem written by Salih ben Sharif al-Rundi

Rithā’ al-Andalus
- by Abu al-Baqa ar-Rundi
- Original title: رثاء الأندلس
- Written: 1267
- Language: Arabic
- Genre: rithā’
- Form: qaṣīda nūniyya

Full text
- Translation:Ritha' al-Andalus at Wikisource

Rithā’ al-Andalus (Arabic: رثاء الأندلس, variously translated as "An Elegy to al-Andalus" or "Elegy for the fall of al-Andalus"), also known as Lament for the Fall of Seville, is an Arabic qaṣīda nūniyya which is said to have been written by Andalusi poet Abu al-Baqa ar-Rundi in 1267, "on the fate of al-Andalus after the loss, in 664/1266, of several places in the provinces of Murcia and Jerez" to the Christian kingdoms during the Reconquista.

This poem is considered the most significant of a series of poems that were written in the classical tradition of rithā’ (which denotes both lamentation and a literary genre in itself) by Andalusi poets who had been inspired by the Reconquista. Ar-Rundi makes notable use of personification as a rhetorical device.

== History ==
The poem appears to have been written some time between the fall of Seville of 1248, an event mentioned in the poem, and the poet's death in 1285. The emotional intensity of the poem indicates it was written around the mid 13th century in the immediate aftermath of the catastrophic events described in the poem.

The text of the poem was recorded in Nafh at-Tib by Ahmad al-Maqqari (1577–1632).

== Context and purpose ==
Ar-Rundi lived through the fall of most of the major Andalusi cities—such as Cadiz, Cordoba, Seville (mentioned as "Hims"), and others—to the forces of the Catholic monarchs: Alfonso VIII of Castile and his grandson Ferdinand III, Sancho VII of Navarre, and Peter II of Aragon. Most major Andalusi cities fell within the span of a century with the collapse of the Almohad Caliphate.

Ar-Rundi composed his poem mourning the fall of al-Andalus and calling the Islamic kingdoms on the North African shore, particularly the Marinid Sultanate, when the king of Granada started to concede towns and castles to the Crown of Castille.

== Composition ==
The poem is a nūniyya, as virtually all of its couplets end in an alveolar nasal—either from the letter ن (nun) or from nunation. The opening line alludes to that of the famous nūniyya of Abu al-Fath al-Busti:

Opening line of Rithā’ al-Andalus	Opening line of Nūniyyat al-Bustī
لِكُلِّ شَيءٍ إِذَا ما تَمَّ نُقْصانُ	زِيادَةُ المَرْءِ في دُنِياهُ نُقْصانُ
li-kulli shay'in idha ma tamma nuqsan	ziyadatu l-mur'i fi dunyahu nuqsan
All things upon reaching their pinnacle begin to decline	A person's increase in material wealth is (in truth) only loss

The poem is full of allusions to figures and symbols from the depths of Arab and Middle Eastern culture. It mentions ancient Arab tribes such as ʿĀd, Shaddad, and Qahtan, as well as quasi-mythic historical figures such as Sasan, Korah, Sayf ibn Dhi Yazan, Darius the Great, and Solomon, asking: "Where are they now?"

In the poem, the speaker eulogizes the fallen cities one by one, using religious symbols to concretize the impending, menacing threat of the Catholics' invasion. The speaker mentions the minbars and the mihrabs that "mourn" beside the bells and crucifixes in the mosques that were transformed into churches.

== Cultural references ==
N3rdistan, led by Walid Ben Selim, performed this poem in a musical arrangement in 2014.

== Sources ==
- Alansari, Wahab (2009). An Anthology of Arabic Poetry. ISBN 9780977496129.
- Benhamouda, Ahmed (1935). "Al-Wāfī fī Nazm al-Ḳawāfī d'Abū-l-baḳā B. Šarif al-Rundī". Mélanges Gaudefroy-Demombynes (in French). Cairo.
- Jayyusi, Salma Khadra (1996). "The persistence of the qasida form". In Sperl, Stefan; Shackle, Christopher (eds.). Qasida poetry in Islamic Asia and Africa. ISBN 9004103872.
- Kahera, Akel Isma’il (2012). Reading the Islamic City: Discursive Practices and Legal Judgment. Lexington Books. p. xviii. ISBN 9780739110010.
- Khalidi, Tarif (2016). Anthology of Arabic Literature: From the Classical to the Modern. ISBN 9781474410809.
