= Al Hajri (surname) =

Al Hajri is a surname. Notable people with the surname include:

- Al-Anoud bint Mana Al Hajri, Qatari royal
- Ali Al-Hajri (born 1962), former Kuwaiti politician
- Khalid Al-Hajri (born 1994), Omani footballer
- Mohamed Ahmed Al-Hajri (1889–1960), Yemeni historian, genealogist and judge
- Nasser Al Hajri (born 1981), retired Kuwaiti footballer
- Rashed Al Hajri (born 1995), Emirati footballer
- Saeed Al-Hajri (bowler), Qatari ten-pin bowler
- Saeed Al-Hajri (rally driver) (born 1950), Qatari rally driver
- Salem Al-Hajri (born 1996), Qatari footballer
- Shujoun Al-Hajri (born 1988), Kuwaiti actress and broadcaster
