= Nuniyya =

Arabic poetic form

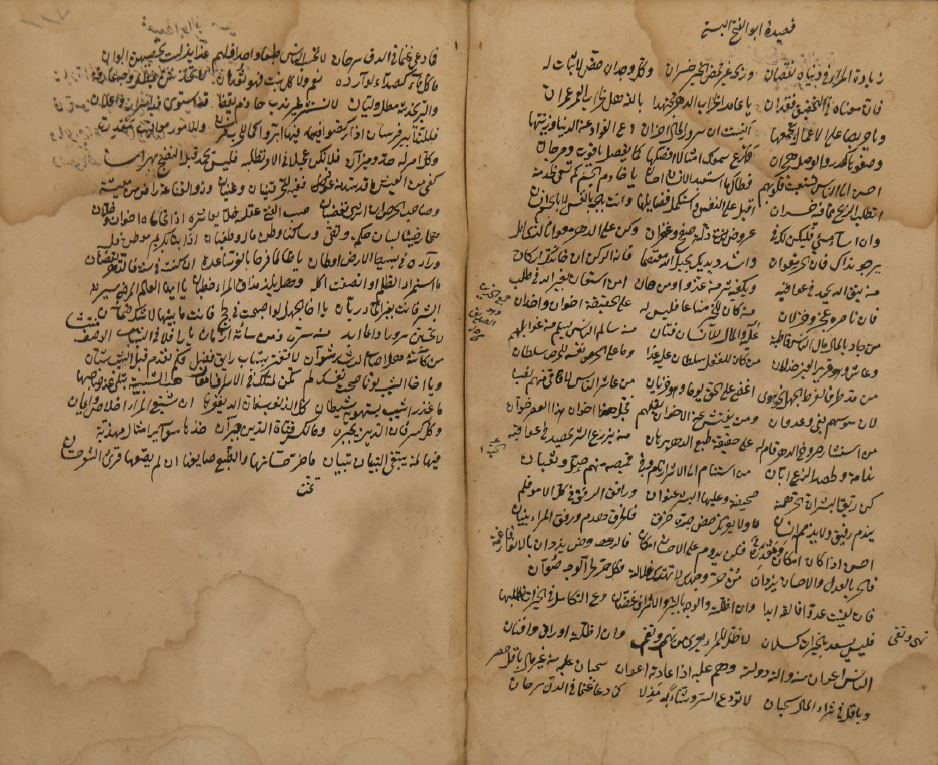
A manuscript of Al-Busti's nuniyya, which opens: زيادة المرء في دنياه نقصان ('To ascend in one's world is to decline')

A nūniyya (Arabic: نُونِيَّة, plural نونيات nūniyyāt) is a monorhyme Arabic poetic form in which each line ends with an n sound, coming either from the letter nūn (ن) or from nunation (تَنْوِيْن tanwīn). This creates the consonant rhyme scheme of the poem.

Among the most famous nuniyyas are the Nuniyya of Ibn Zaydun, the Nuniyya of Khidr Bey, the Nuniyya of Ibn Qayyim, the Nuniyya of Imam al-Qahtani al-Andalusi, the Nuniyya of Abu al-Fath al-Busti, and "Ritha' al-Andalus" by Abu al-Baqa ar-Rundi.
