= Akmal al-Din al-Babarti =

14th century Islamic Scholar and Jurist

Akmal al-Din al-Babarti أكمل الدين البابرتي

Personal life
- Born: 710 A.H. = 1310 A.D. 714 A.H. = 1314 A.D. There has been some misunderstanding about the birthplace. Some scholars have assumed that he was from Baberta, a village in the outskirts of Baghdad, and some others said that his nisbah al-Rumi indicates origins from the Pontic town of Babert (Bayburt) in the vicinity of Erzurum.
- Died: 786 A.H. = 1384 A.D. Cairo, Egypt
- Era: Islamic Golden Age
- Region: Turkey – Iraq
- Main interest(s): Aqidah, Kalam (Islamic theology), Fiqh (Islamic jurisprudence), Usul al-Fiqh (principles of jurisprudence), Tafsir (Quranic exegesis), Hadith studies, Islamic inheritance jurisprudence, Nahw (Arabic grammar), Arabic literature, Morphology (linguistics), Rhetoric
- Notable work(s): Al-'Inayah Sharh al-Hidayah, Sharh Wasiyyat al-Imam Abi Hanifa

Religious life
- Religion: Islam
- Denomination: Sunni
- Jurisprudence: Hanafi
- Creed: Maturidi

Muslim leader
- Influenced by: Abu Hanifa Abu Mansur al-Maturidi Abu Hayyan al-Gharnati
- Influenced: Al-Sharif al-Jurjani Shams al-Din al-Fanari

Akmal al-Din al-Babarti (Arabic: أكمل الدين البابرتي), was a Hanafi scholar, jurist, scholastic Maturidi theologian, mufassir (Quranic exegete), muhaddith (Hadith scholar), grammarian (nahawi), an eloquent orator, and prolific author with more than 40 works to his name.

He was praised by several famous scholars, including Ibn Hajar al-'Asqalani, Al-Suyuti, Al-Maqrizi, Ibn Qutlubugha, Ibn Taghribirdi, Ibn al-Hinna'i, Muhammad ibn Iyas, Ibn al-'Imad al-Hanbali, and Abd al-Hayy al-Lucknawi, and the Sultan Barquq was honoring him.

== Teachers ==
After studying in Aleppo, he moved to Cairo in 740 A.H. (1340 A.D.) where he studied with Shams al-Din al-Isfahani (d. 749/1348), Qawam al-Din al-Kaki (d. 749/1348), Abu Hayyan al-Andalusi (d. 745/1344), Ibn 'Abd al-Hadi (d. 744/1343) and other renowned scholars.

He was appointed as professor in Cairo in the khanqah of the Amir Sayf al-Din Shaykhu/Shaykhun al-Nasiri (also al-'Umari), who was originally a member of the household of Sultan al-Nasir Muhammad b. Kalawun (d. 741/1341).

== Students ==
Among his celebrated students are Al-Sharif al-Jurjani (d. 1413) and Shams al-Din al-Fanari (d. 1430 or 1431).

== Books ==
He wrote more than 40 works in Aqidah, Kalam (Islamic theology), Fiqh (Islamic jurisprudence), Usul al-Fiqh (Principles of Islamic jurisprudence), Tafsir (Quranic exegesis), Hadith studies, Islamic inheritance jurisprudence, Nahw (Arabic grammar), Arabic literature, Morphology (linguistics), and Rhetoric.

He wrote commentary on al-Kashshaf. His other works include commentary on Mashariq al-Anwar, commentary on Mukhtasar of Ibn al-Hajib, commentary on Nasir al-Din al-Tusi's Tajrid al-I'tiqad, commentary on al-Hidaya on jurisprudence, commentary on the Alfiyya of Ibn Malik on grammar, commentary on al-Manar, and commentary on al-Bazdawi.

Some of his books are as follows:

- Al-'Inayah Sharh al-Hidayah (Arabic: العناية شرح الهداية). This is a commentary on al-Marghinani's book “al Hidayah”.
- Sharh al-'Aqidah al-Tahawiyyah (Arabic: شرح العقيدة الطحاوية, romanized: trans, lit. 'A commentary on the creed of Imam al-Tahawi').
- Sharh Wasiyyat al-Imam Abi Hanifa (Arabic: شرح وصية الإمام أبي حنيفة).
- Sharh al-Fiqh al-Akbar by Imam Abu Hanifa (Arabic: شرح الفقه الأكبر للإمام أبي حنيفة).
- Sharh Usul Fakhr al-Islam al-Bazdawi (Arabic: شرح أصول فخر الإسلام البزدوي).
- Sharh Mukhtasar Ibn al-Hajib (Arabic: شرح مختصر ابن الحاجب).
- A commentary (Hashiya) on al-Kashshaf by al-Zamakhshari.
- A commentary (Hashiya) on Tajrid al-Kalam by Nasir al-Din al-Tusi.

== See also ==
- Abu Hanifa
- Abu Mansur al-Maturidi
- 'Ala' al-Din al-Bukhari
- Badr al-Din al-Ayni
- Ibn Abidin
- Al-Maydani
- Ali al-Qari
- Shah Waliullah Dehlawi
- Muhammad Zahid al-Kawthari
- List of Hanafis
- List of Ash'aris and Maturidis
- List of Muslim theologians
