= Abu Musa al-Jazuli =

Moroccan philologist and grammarian

- Born: 1146 AD (540 AH); Sous region, (in present-day Morocco)
- Died: 1211 AD (607 AH); Azemmour, (in present-day Morocco)

Academic background
- Influences: Ibn Barrī, al-Bukhārī

Academic work
- Notable works: Al-Qānūn, also known as Al-Muqaddima al-Jazūlīyya
- Influenced: Ibn Mu‘ṭī al-Zawāwī, Abū ‘Alī al-Shalūbīnī Talib Mir

Abu Musa al-Jazuli (Arabic: أبو موسى الجزولي; full name: Īsā ibn ‘Abd al-Azīz ibn Yalalbakht ibn Īsā ibn Yūmārīlī al-Barbarī al-Marākeshī al-Yazadaktnī al-‘Alāmah; عيسى بن عبد العزيز بن يللبخت بن عيسى بن يوماريلي البربري المراكشي البزدكتني العلامة أبو موسى الجزولي), (Note: 'Yalbakht' and 'Yūmārilī' are Berber names, and 'Jazūlī' means ‘of the Jazūla’, a nomadic Berber tribe. Al-Qifṭī gives 'Kazūlī' with Kaf (ك). The Yazdaktan were a sub-tribe of the Jazūla on the plains of Sous.) was philologist and grammarian, who produced an encyclopaedia called Al-Qānūn, or Al-Muqaddima of al-Jazūlī. Many scholars wrote tafsir (literary critiques) or sharḥ (commentaries), and it was incorporated in many grammars. Nevertheless, its opacity challenged the best language scholars. Al-Jazūlī was the first to introduce Al-Ṣiḥāḥ fī al-lughah (الصحاح تاج اللغة وصحاح العربية) of al-Jawhari to the Maghreb, and he makes many references to this and other works in his Muqaddima.

== Life ==
Al-Jazuli was probably born in 540 AH (1146 AD) at Idaw gharda. He was from the Yazdaktan tribe, a branch of the Berber tribe Jazula in the Sous region of Morocco. His early education was in the cosmopolitan Moroccan city of Marrakesh, the Almohad capital filled with scholars, writers and grammarians, fine buildings, fountains and public amenities.

After his early education in Marrakesh, Al-Jazuli went to make the pilgrimage to Mecca and medina. Returning from the hajj, he stayed in Cairo and Alexandria. Although he experienced poverty there he attended lectures under Abū Muḥammad ‘Abd Allāh ibn Barrī on Assihah of al-Jawhari and al-Jumal of al-Zajjaji. He also studied the Ṣaḥīḥ of al-Bukhari with Abū Muḥammad ibn ‘Ubayd Allāh. Financial hardship forced his return to the Maghreb. At Béjaïa, he lectured on philology for a time, then moved on to Algiers and taught his Qānūn to the grammarian Abū ibn Qāsim ibn Mandās al-Āshīrī. He then travelled to Almería, in Al-Andalus (present-day Spain), to teach for a period. Then he returned to Morocco and settled down in Marrakesh, where he started teaching Arabic. As his Qānūn became famous and his reputation grew, so students from far and wide came to hear him lecture. When the mosque where he taught became full to capacity he moved to the Mosque of Ibn al-Abakm, north of Mahallat al-Sharqiyyin, under the passage of the Great Bab Aghmat to the side of Al Awadin. The ascetic Abū 'l-‘Abbās al-Maghribī, made representations to the Almohad Caliph, al-Mansur, who entrusted al-Jazūlī with the khuṭba at the great mosque at Marrakesh. Before his death, al-Mansur declared in his will that the only one who will wash his body is al-Jazuli. Ibn Khallikan quotes a satirical verse that al-Jazuli is said to have quipped to a pestering student about the eighth-century grammarian of the Basra school, Abu 'Amr ibn al-'Ala', wherein he puns a famous grammatical example of declension.

Al-Jazūlī died at Azemmour, Morocco c. 607 AH (c. 1210 AD).

== His Professors ==
- Ibn Barrī; who lectured on Al-Jumal by al-Zajjājī, Al-Kitāb by Sībawayh and Al-Uṣūl by Ibn al-Sarraj. Material from these studies were incorporated into Al-Qānūn. Such was his dire financial state while in Alméria, he had to sell his own autograph copy of Al-Uṣūl.
- Abū Muhammad ibn ‘Ubayd Allāh al-Hajri al-Adawi al-Andalusi, who lectured on the Ṣaḥīḥ of al-Bukhārī.
- Muhallab ibn al-Ḥassān ibn Barakat ibn Ali ibn Ghayath ibn Salman al-Muhallabī al-Naḥwī, a student of Ibn Barri, al-Jazuli studied nahw under him.
- Abū Ṭāhir al-Silafī
- Abū Hafs Umar ibn Abī Bakr b. Ibrāhīm al-Tamimi al-Saadi al-Saqaili
- Abu al-Mansur Zafir al-Maliki al-Usuli, studied uṣūl al-fiqh under him
- Abu Abdallah ibn Ibrahim al-Jaza'iri, studied uṣūl al-fiqh under him

== His Disciples ==
- Ibn Mu‘ṭī al-Zawāwī grammarian, author of Alfiyya.
- Abū ‘Alī ‘Umar ibn Muḥammad ibn ‘Umar ibn ‘Abd Allāh al-Azdī al-Shalūbīnī edited al-Jazūlī 's Qānūn with commentaries. (Note: Al-Jazūlī 's Qānūn with commentaries copies Escurial; J. Derenbourg Catalogue; no.2, 36, 190.)
- Alam al-Din al-Qasim ibn Ahmad ibn al-Muwaffaq al-Luraqi al-Andalusi.

== Works ==
- Sharh qasidat Banat Su'ad (Commentary on Bānat Su‘ād by Ka'b ibn Zuhayr), ed., R. Basset (Algiers, 1910)
- Al-Qānūn, (Al-Muqaddima al-Jazūliyya), ‘The Canon’, or ‘The Introduction of al-Jazūli’; a dense, esoteric and scholarly classification of rare linguistic expressions; (commentary); Ibn Khallikān called it ‘a most original production.’
- Amālī fi 'l-naḥw (dictations on grammar);
- Al-Fasr, ‘The Explanation’; An abridged version of the Abū al-Fath ‘Uthman b. Jinnī’s commentary on al-Mutanabbī’s dīwān
- Commentary on the 'Uṣūl' of Ibn al-Sarrāj; (grammar).

== Bibliography ==
- Abbār (Ibn al-), Muhammad ibn 'Abd Allāh (1889). Codera, F. (ed.). Kitāb al-takmila li-kitāb al-ṣila. Bibliotheca arabico-hispana (in Arabic). Matriti: Michaelem Romero. p. 690 (§1932).
- ‘Amād (Ibn al-), ʻAbd al-Ḥayy ibn Aḥmad (1989). Shadharāt al-dhahab fī akhbār man dhahab (in Arabic). Vol. 7. Beirut: Dār Ibn Khalīl. pp. 49–50.
- Bencheneb, Mohamed (1991). "al- D̲j̲azūlī". In Lewis, B.; Pellat, Ch.; Schacht, J. (eds.). Encyclopaedia of Islam. Vol. II (2nd ed.). Leiden: E. J. Brill. p. 528. ISBN 90-04-07026-5.
- Daljī (al-), Aḥmad b. ‘Alī (2014). Al-Falāka wa 'l-maflūkūn (in Arabic). Cairo: Sharikat Nawābigh al-Fikr. pp. 122–3.
- Dhahabī (al-), Shams al-Dīn (2003). Tārīkh al-Islām (in Arabic). Vol. 13. Beirut: Dar al-Garb al-Islami. pp. 170–172, 246.
- Fīrūzābādī, Muḥammad ibn Yaʻqūb (2000). Bulgha fi ta'rīkh a'immat al-lugha (in Arabic). Dimashq: Dār Sa’d al-Dīn. pp. 226–7 (§263).
- Husayn, Hashim Ja'far (2015). al-Juhud al-nahwiyya li-Abi Musa l-Jazuli (in Arabic). Amman: Redwan Publishing House. ISBN 978-9957-76-336-7.
- Jazarī (Ibn al-), Shamsuddīn (1971). Bergsträsser, G. (ed.). Ghāyat al-Nihāyah fī Ṭabaqāt al-Qurrā' (in Arabic). Vol. I. Beirut: Dar al-Kotob al-Ilmiyah. p. 539 (§2493).
- Jawharī (al-), Ismail ibn Hammad (1979). Al-Ṣiḥāḥ fī al-lughah (in Arabic) (2 ed.). Bayrūt: Dār al-ʻIlm lil-Malāyīn.
- Khallikān (Ibn), Aḥmad ibn Muḥammad (1843). Ibn Khallikan's Biographical Dictionary (tr. Wafayāt al-A'yān wa-al-Anbā Abnā' al-Zamān). Vol. ii. Translated by McGuckin de Slane, William. London: W.H. Allen. pp. 71, 422.
- Marākishī (al-), M. b. M. b. ʻA. al-Malik (1964). al-Dhayl wa-al-takmilah: li-kitābay al-Mawṣūl wa-al-Ṣilah. Maktabah al-Andalusīyah 10. (in Arabic). Vol. 5. Beirut: Dār al-Thaqāfah. pp. 116–126.
- Masarwa, Alev (2019). "al-Jazūlī, Abū Mūsā". In Fleet, Kate; Krämer, Gudrun; Matringe, Denis; Nawas, John; Rowson, Everett (eds.). Encyclopaedia of Islam (3rd ed.). E. J. Brill.
- Qifṭī (al-), Jamāl al-Dīn Abū al-Ḥasan (1986). Inbāh al-ruwāẗ ʻalā anbāh al-nuḥāẗ (in Arabic). Vol. 2. al-Qāhiraẗ; Bayrūt: Dār al-fikr al-ʻarabī; Mūʼsasaẗ al-kutub al-t̲aqāfiyyaẗ. pp. 378–380.
- Semlālī (al-), al-Abbās ibn Ibrāhīm (1993). Ibn Manṣūr, ‘Abd Al-Wahab (ed.). Al-i'lām biman ḥali mārrakesh wa'aghmāt min al-a'lām (in Arabic). Vol. 9. Rabat: Al-Maṭba’at al-Malikiya. pp. 404–412 (§1493).
