= Khidr Bey =

Ottoman Hanafi-Maturidi scholar and poet

Khidr Beg خضر بك
- Title: Khidr Beg Çelebi

Personal life
- Born: 810 A.H. = 1407 A.D. Sivrihisar, Turkey
- Died: Some reports place his death in 860 A.H. = 1456 A.D., but 863 A.H. = 1459 A.D. is more likely Constantinople (nowadays Istanbul)
- Era: Islamic Golden Age
- Region: Ottoman Empire
- Main interest(s): Aqidah, Kalam (Islamic theology), Logic, Fiqh (Islamic jurisprudence), Arabic prosody, Literature, Tafsir
- Notable work(s): Jawahir al-'Aqa'id, better known as: al-Qasida al-Nuniyya ("Ode Rhyming in the Letter Nun [N]")

Religious life
- Religion: Islam
- Denomination: Sunni
- Jurisprudence: Hanafi
- Creed: Maturidi

Muslim leader
- Influenced by: Abu Hanifa Abu Mansur al-Maturidi Shams al-Din al-Fanari Sa'd al-Din al-Taftazani
- Influenced: Al-Khayali

Khidr Bey or Khidr Beg (Turkish: Hızır Çelebi (Hızır Bey); (Note: The name Hıdırbey is originally Khidr Bey, Lord Khidr.) Arabic: خضر بك) was an Ottoman Sunni Hanafi-Maturidi scholar and poet of the 9th/15th century, and the first kadi (qadi) of Istanbul. The unique source for his biography is the Arabic original of al-Shaqa'iq al-Nu'maniyya by Tash-Kopru-Zade.

== Biography ==
He was born in Sivrihisar, where his father, Jalal al-Din, was kadi — though the fact that the latter was, also. He completed his studies in Bursa under the famous scholar Molla Yegan, whose daughter he married, and is then said to have returned to Sivrihisar as a teacher. He acquired such a reputation for learning that he was appointed to the madrasa of Murad II in Bursa with an increase in stipend, and certain of his pupils here were subsequently to become scholars of great eminence. Next he taught at the madrasa of Bayezid I in Bursa, again with an increased stipend, and in addition was appointed kadi of İnegöl. From here he moved to the newest of the two madrasas in the Üç Şerefeli Mosque in Edirne, and thence to Yanbolu (in present-day Bulgaria) as kadi.

His three sons, Ya'kub Pasha, Mufti Ahmad Pasha and Sinan Pasha, were also notable scholars, the latter being the author of the famous Tadarru'dt.

== Death ==
After the conquest of Istanbul in 857/1453, he was appointed its first kadi, in which post he remained until his death in 863/1458-9. He is buried in the Zeyrek quarter of Istanbul, where he also built the mosque later attributed to a certain Hadjdji Kadin.

He was buried next to the tomb of Abu Ayyub al-Ansari (Eyüp Cemetery), the companion of Muhammad who died during the First Arab Siege of Constantinople (674–678 CE).

== Works ==
Although Khidr Beg is reputed to have introduced the versified chronogram into Ottoman literature, very few of his Turkish poems have survived and his reputation rests on three poems in Arabic.

The first, a didactic qasida in the basit metre on the creed, is known as the Nuniyya and has been the subject of several commentaries, most notably that by his pupil al-Khayali.

Another qasida, also a Nuniyya, also called Jawahir al-'Aqa'id (Arabic: جواهر العقائد), dealing with the creed, but in the wafir metre, is usually known as 'Ujalat layla aw laylatayn (Arabic: عجالة ليلة أو ليلتين), is paid special attention in Ottoman period by writing many commentaries.

Finally, there is a Mustazad, in a Persian variety of the hazadj metre, which was greatly admired and attracted imitations for over a century. Bursali Mehmed Tahir mentions a translation into Persian of the Mafdli' which he made at the request of Sultan Mehmed the Conqueror, the work in question probably being the Matali' al-Anwar, on logic, by Siraj al-Din Urmavi (d. 1283).

== See also ==
- Abu Hanifa
- Abu Mansur al-Maturidi
- Shams al-Din al-Fanari
- Sa'd al-Din al-Taftazani
- Al-Sharif al-Jurjani
- Akmal al-Din al-Babarti
- Ibn Kemal
- Ebussuud Efendi
- Muhammad Zahid al-Kawthari
- Muhammed Hamdi Yazır
- Abd al-Ghani al-Nabulsi
- Shah Waliullah Dehlawi
- Abd al-Hayy al-Lucknawi
- List of Ash'aris and Maturidis
- List of Muslim theologians

== Notes ==
Early Islamic scholars

Muhammad, The final Messenger of God (570–632) the Constitution of Medina, taught the Quran, and advised his companions
Abdullah ibn Masud (died 653) taught	Ali (607–661) fourth caliph taught	Aisha, Muhammad's wife and Abu Bakr's daughter taught	Abd Allah ibn Abbas (618–687) taught	Zayd ibn Thabit (610–660) taught	Umar (579–644) second caliph taught	Abu Hurairah (603–681) taught
Alqama ibn Qays (died 681) taught	Husayn ibn Ali (626–680) taught	Qasim ibn Muhammad ibn Abi Bakr (657–725) taught and raised by Aisha	Urwah ibn Zubayr (died 713) taught by Aisha, he then taught	Said ibn al-Musayyib (637–715) taught	Abdullah ibn Umar (614–693) taught	Abd Allah ibn al-Zubayr (624–692) taught by Aisha, he then taught
Ibrahim al-Nakha’i taught	Ali ibn Husayn Zayn al-Abidin (659–712) taught	Hisham ibn Urwah (667–772) taught	Ibn Shihab al-Zuhri (died 741) taught	Salim ibn Abd-Allah ibn Umar taught	Umar ibn Abdul Aziz (682–720) raised and taught by Abdullah ibn Umar
Hammad ibn Abi Sulayman taught	Muhammad al-Baqir (676–733) taught	Farwah bint al-Qasim Jafar's mother
Abu Hanifa (699–767) wrote Al Fiqh Al Akbar and Kitab Al-Athar, jurisprudence followed by Sunni, Sunni Sufi, Barelvi, Deobandi, Zaidiyyah and originally by the Fatimid and taught	Zayd ibn Ali (695–740)	Ja'far bin Muhammad Al-Baqir (702–765) Muhammad and Ali's great great grand son, jurisprudence followed by Shia, he taught	Malik ibn Anas (711–795) wrote Muwatta, jurisprudence from early Medina period now mostly followed by Maliki Sunnis in North Africa, and taught	Al-Waqidi (748–822) wrote history books like Kitab al-Tarikh wa al-Maghazi, student of Malik ibn Anas	Abu Muhammad Abdullah ibn Abdul Hakam (died 829) wrote biographies and history books, student of Malik ibn Anas
Abu Yusuf (729–798) wrote Usul al-fiqh	Muhammad al-Shaybani (749–805)	al-Shafi‘i (767–820) wrote Al-Risala, jurisprudence followed by Shafi'i Sunnis and Sufis, and taught	Ismail ibn Ibrahim	Ali ibn al-Madini (778–849) wrote The Book of Knowledge of the Companions	Ibn Hisham (died 833) wrote early history and As-Sirah an-Nabawiyyah, Muhammad's biography
Isma'il ibn Ja'far (719–775)	Musa al-Kadhim (745–799)	Ahmad ibn Hanbal (780–855) wrote Musnad Ahmad ibn Hanbal jurisprudence followed by Hanbali Sunnis and Sufis	Muhammad al-Bukhari (810–870) wrote Sahih al-Bukhari hadith books	Muslim ibn al-Hajjaj (815–875) wrote Sahih Muslim hadith books	Dawud al-Zahiri (815–883/4) founded the Zahiri school	Muhammad ibn Isa at-Tirmidhi (824–892) wrote Jami` at-Tirmidhi hadith books	Al-Baladhuri (died 892) wrote early history Futuh al-Buldan, Genealogies of the Nobles
Ibn Majah (824–887) wrote Sunan ibn Majah hadith book	Abu Dawood (817–889) wrote Sunan Abu Dawood Hadith Book
Muhammad ibn Ya'qub al-Kulayni (864- 941) wrote Kitab al-Kafi hadith book followed by Twelver Shia	Muhammad ibn Jarir al-Tabari (838–923) wrote History of the Prophets and Kings, Tafsir al-Tabari	Abu al-Hasan al-Ash'ari (874–936) wrote Maqālāt al-islāmīyīn, Kitāb al-luma, Kitāb al-ibāna 'an usūl al-diyāna
Ibn Babawayh (923–991) wrote Man La Yahduruhu al-Faqih jurisprudence followed by Twelver Shia	Sharif Razi (930–977) wrote Nahj al-Balagha followed by Twelver Shia	Nasir al-Din al-Tusi (1201–1274) wrote jurisprudence books followed by Ismaili and Twelver Shia	Al-Ghazali (1058–1111) wrote The Niche for Lights, The Incoherence of the Philosophers, The Alchemy of Happiness on Sufism	Rumi (1207–1273) wrote Masnavi, Diwan-e Shams-e Tabrizi on Sufism
Key: Some of Muhammad's Companions	Key: Taught in Medina	Key: Taught in Iraq	Key: Worked in Syria	Key: Travelled extensively collecting the sayings of Muhammad and compiled books of hadith	Key: Worked in Persia
