= Ibn Muti al-Zawawi =

Islamic Scholar and Hanfi jurist (1169–1231)

- Born: c. 1168–1169 (564 AH); Bejāya (Bugia), (present-day Algeria)
- Died: September 1231 (aged 61–63) (Dhu al-Qadah, 628 AH); Cairo, Egypt
- Other names: Abū Zakarīyā’ Yaḥyā b. ‘Abd al-Mu’ṭī b. ‘Abdannūr al-Zawāwī al-Magribī al-Gazā’irī (يحيى بن عبد المعطي بن عبد النور الزواوي); or Abū al-Ḥusayn Yaḥyā ‘Abd al-Mu’ṭī b. ‘Abd al-Nūr al-Zawāwī (ابو الحسين يحيىبن عبد المعطي بن عبد النور الزواوي).

Academic work
- Notable works: Al-Durra al-alfiyah fi ‘ilm al-‘arabiyah

Ibn Mu‘ṭī al-Zawāwī (ابن معطي الزواوي)—Abū 'l-Ḥusayn Yaḥyā ibn ‘Abd al-Nur Zayn al-Dīn al-Zawāwī, or Abū Zakarīyā’ Yaḥyā ibn ‘Abd al-Mu’ṭī ibn ‘Abdannūr az-Zawāwī (c. 1168-1169 – 1231 CE (564–628 AH)); was a Ḥanafī faqīh (jurist), grammarian, poet and philologian of the Maghreb and the author of first versified grammatical work, the Alfiyya, commentaries on grammatical treatises and versified lexicographic works. He also wrote numerous works on various scholarly categories. He was one of the foremost medieval grammarians.

== Life ==
Ibn Mu’ṭī al-Zawāwī was born in Béjaïa in 1168 into the Berber Zawāwa tribe hence his nisba “al-Zawāwī”. He grew up during the scientific and cultural efflorescence of the Islamic Maghreb. The region centred on the city of Béjaïa was at the pinnacle of its prosperity. He studied under Abu Musa al-Jazuli. He memorised Al-Ṣiḥāḥ fī al-lughah (الصحاح تاج اللغة وصحاح العربية) of al-Jawhari

He received early education in Béjaïa. In 1227 (624 AH) he travelled East to Damascus with a delegation, and was welcomed by the Ayyubid ruler, Al-Mu'azzam Isa. He then spent many years teaching philology in the mosques of Damascus. In this period he simplified the teaching of language, literature and grammar.

When al-Mu'azzam Īsā al-Ayyūbī died, the sultan's son, al-Naṣr Dā’ūd, was quickly deposed by his two uncles al-Kāmil and al-Ashraf. The new sultan al-Kāmil honoured Ibn Mu’ti and persuaded him to accompany him to Cairo where he was given a salary and appointed lecturer in grammar and literature at the Mosque of Amr ibn al-As, also known as ‘al-Jamī ‘l-Atīk’.

He composed a number of works on grammar as well as a collection of orations, a diwan of poetry and a treatise on the readings of the Quran. The most important out of the works he produced is ad-Durra al-alfiyya which was a pedagogical grammar of the Arabic language composed in verse totalling one thousand lines, several commentaries were written on it. This work appears frequently in the list of works studied of memorised by the ulama of the Mamluk period. His work was also the model for a new genre of compositions as many subsequent scholars would try their hands at writing alfiyyat.

Ibn Mu’ṭī died in Sept 1231, his funeral was attended by the Ayyubid Sultan and he was buried near the mausoleum of imām al-Shāfī by the Khandak.

== Teachers ==
Ibn Mu‘ṭī studied fiqh ḥadīth, jurisprudence and language with distinguished scholars each famous in his field:

- Abū Mūsā al-Jazūlī (أبو موسى الجزولي) (1146 - ca.1211)
- Al-Qāsim Ibn Asakir (القاسم بن عساكر), d.1204/600 AH
- Taj al-Dīn al-Kindi (تاج الدين الكندي) (1126 - 1217)
- Mamluk al-Kindi d.1258/656 AH

== Pupils ==
Ibn al-Hajib d. 1247

As-Suwaydi

Ibn al-Anbārī

== Works ==
- Al-Durra al-alfiyya fi Ilm al-‘arabiyya (الدرة الألفية في علم العربية); produced 3. Nov. 1198 AD (595 AH) the first grammatical treatise in one thousand verses. Numerous scholars wrote commentaries of it and ed., K. V. Zetterstéen produced a critical edition (Leipzig 1900). Muḥammad ibn Aḥmad al-Andalusī Bakri al-Sharīshī (1286/ 685) wrote a commentary titled Al-Ta'liqāt al-Wafīyāt. (Note: Latinized spelling Mohammed Ben Ahmed Andalusi Bekri Shérishi 685 (d. 27 Feb. 1286) “El-ta'licát El-Wefíyat”.) The later Alfiyya of Ibn Mālik (1204-1274) eclipsed its fame.
  - Sharh li Alfiyya Ibn Mu‘ṭī (شرح لألفية ابن معطي) by Jamal al-Dīn a. Muḥ. Ḥusayn b Ayāz al-Baghdādī (611/1282 Suyūṭī Bugya 232/3)
- Kitāb al-Fuṣūl (الكتاب الفصول) —‘Book of aphorisms’; grammatical prose treatise numerous commentaries.
- Al-Fuṣūl al-khamsīn (الفصول الخمسون) (Leipzig 1899). E. Sjögren chaps., 1-2.
- Al-Badī' fī ṣinā'at ash-shi'r (Leipzig, 488, iii)
- Al-‘uqud wa’l-qawanīn fī al-naḥw (العقود والقوانين في النحو); ‘Contracts and laws of grammar’
- Kitāb ḥawāšin ‘alā 'uṣul Ibn al-Sarrāj fī al-naḥw (كتاب حواشٍ على أصول ابن السراج في النحو); ‘Commentary on the origins of Ibn al-Sarrāj on grammar’.
- Kitāb šarḥ al-jumal fī al-naḥw (كتاب شرح الجمل في النحو); Phrasal Syntax Analysis
- Kitāb šarḥ 'abyāt Sībawayh naẓm (كتاب شرح أبيات سيبويه نظم); Analysis of Sībawayh's verse systems
- Kitāb dīwān khaṭib (كتاب ديوان خطب); Dīwān of Sermons
- Qaṣida fī al-qara'a al-sabah (قصيدة في القراءات السبع) ‘Poem on the Seven Readings
- Naẓm Kitāb al-ṣiḥāḥ li’l-Jauharī fī al-lughah (نظم كتاب الصحاح للجوهرى في اللغة); ‘Edited Al-Jauharī’s Al-Ṣiḥāḥ, (dictionary) on the essence of language’ (incomplete).
- Naẓm Kitāb al-Jamharah li Ibn Duraid fī al-lughah (نظم كتاب الجمهرة لابن دريد في اللغة); Method of Jamhara fi 'l-Lughat by Ibn Duraid on the science of language (not completed) (Note: Among the many memorized books in his archive was Al-Ṣaḥīḥ by al-Jawharī.)
- Naẓm Kitāban fī al-‘arud (نظم كتاباً في العَرُوض); Systems of ‘arūḍ (poetic meters).
- Kitāb al-muthlath (كتاب المثلث); ‘Book of the Triangle’

== Bibliography ==
=== Primary sources ===
- Dhahabī (al-), Muḥammad ibn Aḥmad (1985). al-'Ibar (in Arabic). Vol. iii. Beirut: Dār al-Kutub al-ʻIlmīyah. pp. 201–2.
- Ḥājjī Khalīfa, Muṣṭafa ibn 'Abd Allāh (1835). Fluegel, Gustav (ed.). Lexicon Bibliographicum et Encyclopaedicum (Kaşf az-Zunūn). The Oriental Translation Fund of Great Britain and Ireland (in Latin). Vol. i. Leipzig: Richard Bentley. p. 415.
- Khalīl (al-), Ṣihāb ad-Dīn Abū 'Al. M. b. a. 'l-'Abbās A. b. Al-Maḥṣūl fī sharḥ al-fuṣūl (المحصول في شرح الفصول).
- Ibn Khallikan, Aḥmad ibn Muḥammad (1868). Wafayāt al-A'yān wa-Anbā' Abnā' al-Zamān (The Obituaries of Eminent Men) [Ibn Khalkan's Biographical dictionary]. Vol. IV. Translated by McGuckin de Slane, William. Paris: Oriental Translation Fund of Great Britain and Ireland.
- Suyūṭī (al-), Jalāl al-Dīn ‘Abd al-Raḥmān (1965). Bughyat al-Wuʻāh fī Ṭabaqāt al-Lughawīyīn wa-al-Nuḥāh (in Arabic). Vol. 2 (§2146). al-Qāhirah: Ṭubiʻa bi-mạṭbaʻat ʻĪsa al-Bābī al-Halabī. p. 344.
- Zawāwī (al-), Yaḥyʹa ibn ʻAbd al-Muʻṭī (1900), Zetterstéen, KV (ed.), al-Durrah al-alfīyah fī ʻilm al-ʻarabīyah (thesis, 1895) (in Arabic and German), translated by Zetterstéen, KV, Leipzig: J.C. Hinrichs.

=== Secondary sources ===
- Bernards, Monique (2020). "Ibn Muʿṭī al- Zawāwī". In Fleet, Kate; Krämer, Gudrun; Matringe, Denis; Nawas, John; Rowson, Everett (eds.). The Encyclopedia of Islam (3rd ed.). E. J. Brill.
- Troupeau, Gérard (1986). "Ibn Mu'ti". In Bearman, P.; Bianquis, Th.; Bosworth, C.E.; van Donzel, E.; Heinrichs, W.P. (eds.). The Encyclopedia of Islam. Vol. III (2nd ed.). E. J. Brill.
- Brockelmann, Carl (1937). Geschichte der Arabischen Litteratur Supplementband (in German). Vol. I. Leiden: E.J. Brill. pp. 530–1.
