= Al Aydi Tarabin =

Bedouin tribe

The Al Aydi Tarabin Tribe (In Arabic: العايد) traces its roots to an ancient Bedouin lineage that extends back to the Banu Ayed or Banu Aed. Its spelling differs on the territory's dialect. They are part of the Jidam and Qahtan tribes, whose origins lie in southern Arabia in today's Yemen, and who belonged to the Arab al Aribah2. They have adopted monotheism more than two thousand years ago.

A branch from the tribe left Yemen in 542 C.E and established themselves in Iraq, Levant, Egypt, Sudan, Maghreb and the South of Spain. Nineteen families settled in the Negev, in today's historical Palestine. The Egyptian branch of the family commonly goes by the name Abaza.

Under the Mameluke administration, the Aydi of the Negev were connected to the Tarabin tribe despite having no blood ties to them. In other occasions, the Aydi family is associated with the Tiyaha or Jubarat tribes due to their involvement in trade, military, or land alliances.

The name commonly used today is Aydi. It is sometimes associated with their reference tribe Tarabin.

== Origins of the name Al-Ayd ==
The Aydi name is sometimes found as العيايدة Al Ayayda, Al Aiidi, Al Ayeth, Al Awaydé or Al Abathia. Bedouin clan and tribe names evolve through time and space, which explains the slight difference in spelling.

The name Al Ayeth or Ayed has three different meanings, stemming from ancient Bedouin Arabic : A young female gazelle; a person who visits the sick to heal them; a traveler with the purpose of serving society.

== Historical settlement ==
A branch of the Aydi, departed from Yemen in 542 C.E., during the period of the decline of South Arabian civilization. They dispersed to various parts of the world, settling in Iraq, Levant, Egypt, Sudan, Maghreb and as far as Andalusia. Nineteen families from the Aydi tribe settled in the Negev and remaining there until 1948. Other Aydi families established themselves in several other locations across Palestine.

A manuscript of Ahmad Al Maqrizi from 1437, kept at the Leiden University, attests that the Aydi are direct descendants of the Jidam, and inhabited Southern Palestine and the areas between Cairo, Egypt and Aqaba, Jordan. According to the memoirs by Etienne Marc Quatremère, a French orientalist specialized in languages and cultures of the Middle-East, the Aydi tribe, descendants of the Jidam, was established between Cairo and Aqaba.

== Main responsibilities ==
=== Protection of a pilgrimage route to Mecca ===
In 1263, a prince known as Muhammad Al-Aydi the Great was entrusted the responsibility of safeguarding the pilgrimage route from Egypt to Mecca, through an agreement with the fourth Mamluk Sultan of the Bahri dynasty, Al-Malik Al-Zahir Baibars. An extension of the route protection from Alexandria to Aqaba, passing through Cairo is mentioned in Ahmad al Maqrizi's manuscript from 1437. This responsibility remained a duty of the Aydi tribe until the opening of the Suez Canal in 1896.

=== Regional Governance and Trade Facilitation ===
In 1370, Sultan Al-Malik Al-Nasir Muhammad Ibn Qalawun assigned Sheikh Ibrahim Ahmad Al-Aydi as the delegate of the Egyptian government for Ash Sharqia (a northeastern governorate of Egypt), Sinai, and Palestine. A village in Ash Sharqia bears the name of the Ayed family, Kura Kfur Al-Ayed. The Sheikh was also appointed as the drafter of commercial contracts for the camel trade.

=== Judicial Mediation and Tribal Arbitration ===
The Bedouins of North Sinai and southern Palestine also entrusted the Sheikhs of the Aydi tribe with a respected social responsibility. From before the Ottoman period until the end of the British Mandate, they were called upon to render judgments in complicated tribal trials, where no witnesses were available. Trials would involve any victim from the tribes under their jurisdiction or any foreign person visiting or passing by in the area.

=== Protection of Saint Catherine's Monastery ===
The Aydi tribe established in Egypt and Palestine was also in charge of safeguarding the St. Catherine's Monastery in Sinai. They served as the trusted party responsible for ensuring the fulfillment of contracts between St. Catherine Monastery and the Bedouin tribes of Tur (Mount Sinai region). Thirty-five Bedouin tribes were in charge of the safety and well-being of the monks and pilgrims traveling to and from Saint Catherine's Monastery, on the roads between Egypt and Syria. The Aydi sheikhs were their guarantors, overseeing or vouching for the fulfillment of the terms of any contract between the two parties. The Monastery preserved records between 1592 and 1851, which mentions this role implemented at least since 1540.

=== Traditional medical care ===
The Aydi tribe branch from the Negev is well known in the region for its medical abilities in traditional Bedouin medicine using amulets, talismans, stones, seeds and plants. One of the meanings of al Aydi is a person that heals the sick. The practice of using occupational surnames in the Arab world has roots that trace back several centuries, likely emerging during the medieval period. The earliest mention of the family name dates back to 1418, which presupposes that the family was known and recognized for its medical skills at least from this period. Negev Bedouins strongly believed in the healing powers of natural elements, often blending traditional remedies with spiritual beliefs. With the development of modern medicine in the 18th century, the women of the tribe were sent abroad in neighboring cities (Cairo, Alexandria, Constantinople, Bagdad, Damascus) where family members lived to complete their medical studies and come back to the Negev region to practice. Until today, all women and to some extent the men of the family undergo medical studies before getting married. This is especially the case for women. Men traditionally have other roles but may develop this skill in certain periods where medical workforce and expertise is needed.

Two maqqams have been erected in the Negev region in honor of charismatic physicians among the Aydi family. In maqqam Abu Ayada is resting Sheikh Abu Ayada, a physician that operated in Shallala near Wadi Sharia, during Ottoman times. Negev Bedouins were using this maqqam to heal animals' diseases. Maqâm Al Hajja Hakimah, located next to Zummara village in الشريعة Ash Sharia is the resting place of Dr. Hakmah Aydi, the founder of the Heritage from the Fragrance of the Land Museum and physician who completed her medical studies in Cairo in 1790. The maqqam still exists today. Negev Bedouins believed that her soul helped women carry healthy babies if they prayed by her maqqam or performed particular amulet processes.

=== Safeguarding knowledge and memory with the Heritage from the Fragrance of the Land Museum ===
With the creation of the Heritage from the Fragrance of the Land Museum (turath min abaqa al turab) around 1790. the Aydi family used their collection as a means to preserve their ancestral knowledge and pass it down to the coming generations. Amulets, talismans, stones, seeds, plants coupled with manuscripts from Avicenna and Abu Al Qasim Al Zahrawi were studied and their practices were preserved among the Bedouins of the Negev

At the end of the 19th century, the Dr. Hissan Aydi Tarabin, the granddaughter of the museum founder used the collection to teach the Bedouins from the community to replicate objects and produce those needed for their everyday life. A certain number were destined for trade. Rugs, embroidered ornaments and jewelry were sold to Egypt, Jerusalem and Mecca using the tribal codes of the Aydi family.

In 2023, the Palestinian National Commission for Education, Culture and Science has recognized the Aydi family for its strong commitment to preserving the cultural identity of Palestinians since the creation of its first collection and museum. The Permanent Delegation of the State of Palestine to UNESCO stressed that the family's museology activities since the 18th century is the national pride of the country.

=== Tribal reorganization from 1875 ===
Under the Mameluke administration, the Aydi of the Negev were connected to the Tarabin tribe despite having no blood ties to them. This was part of an effort to reduce Bedouin influence in Palestine by consolidating smaller clans into larger, fewer tribes, easier to control. The Ottomans, the British and their followers continued this policy. An Ottoman law of 1875 reduced the number to six tribes: the Tarabin, Azazmé, Tiyaha, Jubarat, Hanajré. and Huweitat. Its aim was also to try to forbid Bedouins from traveling outside of Palestine and prevent the ones from the outside to come into Palestine. In other occasions, the Aydi family is associated with the Tiyaha or Jubarat tribes due to their involvement in trade, military, or land alliances
