= Al-Aqida al-Tahawiyya =

Book by Hanafi jurist Abu Ja'far al-Tahawi

Al-'Aqida al-Tahawiyya
- Imam al-Tahawi's Creed of Islam: An Exposition by Siraj al-Din al-Ghaznawi
- Author: Abu Ja'far al-Tahawi
- Original title: Bayan al-Sunna wa al-Jama'a
- Translator: Amjad Mahmood
- Language: Arabic, Albanian, Bengali, English, French, Indonesian, Malay, Persian, Russian, Turkish, and Urdu
- Subject: 'Aqida, Tawhid, Usul al-Din (Islamic theology)
- Publisher: Heritage Press UK
- Publication place: Egypt
- Pages: 200 pages
- ISBN: 978-0993475665

Al-'Aqida al-Tahawiyya (Arabic: العقيدة الطحاوية) or Bayan al-Sunna wa al-Jama'a (Arabic: بيان السنة والجماعة, lit. 'Exposition of Sunna and the Majority') is a popular exposition of Sunni Muslim doctrine written by the tenth-century Egyptian theologian and Hanafi jurist Abu Ja'far al-Tahawi.

== Summary ==
The sole aim of al-Tahawi was to give a summary of the theological views of Abu Hanifa, the founder of the Hanafi school, as he states at the very beginning of his work that it is written in accordance to the methodology of the jurists, Abu Hanifa, Abu Yusuf and Muhammad ibn al-Hasan al-Shaybani. However, it can be said to represent the creed of both the Ash'aris and the Maturidis, especially the latter, given his being a follower of the Hanafi school. The Shafi'i scholar Taj al-Din al-Subki (d. 771/1370) writes that the followers of the four main schools of law, the Hanafis, the Malikis, the Shafi'is and the Hanbalis are all one in creed:

All of them follow the opinion of Ahl al-Sunna wa al-Jama'a (the People of the Prophetic Way and the Majority). They worship Allah in accordance with the creed of Abu al-Hasan al-Ash'ari (and Abu Mansur al-Maturidi). None of them deviates from it, save the riffraff among the Hanafis and the Shafi'is who adopted the Mu'tazili creed and those among the Hanbalis who adopted anthropomorphism. However, Allah protected the Malikis from such things, for we have never seen a Maliki except that he was Ash'ari in creed. In summation, the creed of al-Ash'ari (and al-Maturidi) is what is contained in the creed of Imam Abu Ja'far al-Tahawi, which the scholars of the various legal schools have endorsed and are content with as a creed.

The doctrines enumerated in this work are entirely derived from the Qur'an and the authentic Hadith. It starts with the monotheistic oneness of God, then goes on to the assertion of His positive and eternal attributes. Al-Tahawi asserts the reality of the beatific vision without modality (bila kayf). Most of the other theoretical issues relating to the next world are not rationally explained. God can predetermine some people to be happy and others to be miserable. Knowledge of the decree of God is not given to mankind. Belief consists of assent by heart and confession by tongue. Sinners cannot be declared to be unbelievers. The actions of man are the creation of God and the acquisition of man.

== Commentators ==
Several scholars have written commentaries on this work. Among them are the following:

- Isma'il ibn Ibrahim al-Shaybani (d. 629/1231).
- Najm al-Din Mankubars (d. 652/1254).
- Mahmud al-Qunawi (d. 771/1369), entitled al-Qala'id fi Sharh al-'Aqa'id.
- Shuja' al-Din al-Turkistani (d. 733/1332).
- Siraj al-Din al-Ghaznawi (d. 773/1371).
- Akmal al-Din al-Babarti (d. 786/ 1384).
- Ibn Abi al-'Izz (d. 792/1390). His commentary is rejected by both Maturidis and Ash'aris, accepted and praised by the Salafis.
- Hasan Kafi al-Aqhisari/Pruščak (d. 1025/1616), entitled Nur al-Yaqin fi Usul al-Din.
- 'Abd al-Ghani al-Maydani (d. 1298/1880).
- Qari Muhammad Tayyib (d. 1403/1983).
- Ahmad Jabir Jubran (d. 1425/2004).
- 'Abdullah al-Harari (d. 1429/2008).
- Omar Abdullah Kamel (d. 1436/2015).
- Sa'id Foudah.
- Nidal Ibrahim Alah Rashi (Arabic: نضال إبراهيم آله رشي).
- Mizan Harun, entitled Al-Aqida al-Tahawiyya: In the Light of the Interpretations of the Salaf and Khalaf.

== Contents ==
The text raises many points of creed that are essential matters and defines the belief of the Sunni Muslim, covering the following topics:

1. Exposition of the Creed of Ahl al-Sunnah wa al-Jama'ah
2. Divine Unity
3. Allah's Eternal and Everlasting Names and Attributes
4. Allah's Preordination
5. Muhammad (S) and His Description
6. The Qur'an: the Eternal Word of Allah
7. The Beatific Vision
8. The Prophet's Night Journey (S) and Ascension
9. The Prophet's Basin (S) and Intercession
10. The Covenant Made with Adam (a.s) and His Progeny
11. Divine Decree and Predetermination
12. The Preserved Tablet and the Pen
13. Allah's Attribute of Creating
14. The Throne and the Footstool
15. The Angels, the Prophets and the Revealed Books
16. Declaring the People of the Qiblah to be Muslims
17. Debating about Allah's Essence
18. Arguing about the Qur'an
19. The Impermissibility of Accusing a Muslim of Disbelief
20. The Meaning of Faith
21. Faith Neither Increases nor Decreases
22. The Fate of Major Sinners
23. The Status of a Muslim
24. Rebelling Against Muslim Leaders
25. Wiping Over Footwear
26. Hajj and Jihad
27. The Guardian Angels who were Scribes
28. The Grave and its States
29. Resurrection
30. Paradise and Hellfire
31. The Ability that Accompanies Acts
32. Slaves' Actions
33. Supplication and Alms on Behalf of the Deceased
34. Allah's Wrath and Pleasure
35. Loving the Companions of the Prophet (S)
36. The Order of the Caliphate
37. The Ten Given the Glad Tidings of Paradise
38. Speaking Well of Scholars
39. The Rank of Sainthood
40. Portents of the Final Hour
41. Diviners and Soothsayers
42. Adhering to the Congregation

== Manuscripts ==
The earliest manuscripts preserved in Alexandria were written in 783 AH (1381/1382 CE).

== Translations ==
=== English edition ===
The work has been translated into English and published under the title:

- Islamic Belief, translated and published in 1995 by IQRA International Educational Foundation.
- Islamic Belief: Al-Aqidah at-Tahawiah (Revised Edition), edited by Iqbal Ahmad Azami. Translated and published in 2002 by UK Islamic Academy.
- The Creed of At-Tahawiyy (A Brief Explanation of The Sunniy Creed), 2nd edition published in 2003 by The Association of Islamic Charitable Projects in USA.
- Aqeedatul Tahawi, with commentary by Qari Muhammad Tayyib, the former rector of Darul Uloom Deoband. English translation by Afzal Hoosen Elias. First published in 2007 by Zam Zam Publishers.
- The Creed of Imam al-Tahawi, translated, introduced and annotated by Hamza Yusuf. First published in 2009 by Fons Vitae.
- The Creed of Imam Tahawi, translated by Mohammad Ibrahim Teymori. According to the translator himself, this translation is heavily indebted to the works of Hamza Yusuf and Iqbal Ahmad Azami.
- Al-'Aqidat at-Tahawiyyah (Kindle Edition), translated by Tahir Mahmood Kiani. First published in 2012 by T. M. Kiani.
- Al-'Aqida al-Tahawiyya: Arabic Text with English Translation and Commentary, translated and prepared by Fahim Hoosen. This edition includes a brief and simple commentary. First published in 2015 by Azhar Academy. The second edition published by Dar Ul Thaqafah in 2018.
- Commentary on the Creed of at-Tahawi by Ibn Abi al-Izz (731-792 AH), translated by Muhammad Abdul-Haqq Ansari. First published in 2017 by Istinarah Press.
- Imam al-Tahawi's Creed of Islam: An Exposition, translated by Amjad Mahmood. This edition includes a commentary by the Hanafi scholar, judge and Maturidi theologian Abu Hafs Siraj al-Din al-Ghaznawi (d. 773/1372). First published in 2020 by Heritage Press.

=== Indonesian edition ===
- ‘Aqidah Ath-Thahawiyah: Matan dan Terjemah translation by Nor Kandir. First published in 2017 in Surabaya.

=== French edition ===
- La 'Aqîda Tahâwiyya (La profession de foi des gens de la Sunna), translated and commented on by Corentin Pabiot. Published in 2015 by Maison d'Ennour.

=== Kinyarwanda edition ===
- Ibisobanuro By'imyemerere ya a-twahawiyat : Kugaragaza imyemerere y'abagendera ku migenzo y'Intumwa y'Imana (Ahlu Sunat wal Djama'at), translated by Maktabat al-Qalam, 2020

=== Malay edition ===
- Terjemahan Al-Aqidah Al-Thahawiyyah, translated by Raja Ahmad Mukhlis al-Azhari.

=== Persian edition ===
- Aqida Tahawi, translated by Mohammad Ibrahim Teymori, with foreword by Saeed Ahmad Palanpuri.
- Aqida Tahawi, translated by Sa'di Mahmudi.

=== Russian edition ===
- Акыда ат-Тахавийя, translated with notes by Ahmad Abu Yahya al-Hanafi.

=== Turkish edition ===
- Ehl-i Sünnet Akâidi; Muhtasar Tahâvî Akidesi Şerhi, translated by Ebubekir Sifil.
- Tahâvî Şerhi Bâbertî Tercümesi, translated with commentary of Akmal al-Din al-Babarti (d. 786/1384) by İsmailağa Fıkıh ve Te'lif Kurulu.
- Tâhâvi Akâidi Baberti Şerhi, translated with commentary of al-Babarti (d. 786/1384) by İzzet Karasakal.
- Tahâvi Akîdesi Bâbertî Şerhi, translated with commentary of al-Babarti (d. 786/1384) and Siraj al-Din al-Ghaznawi (d. 773/1372) by Yasin Karataş.
- İslam Akâid Metinleri, translated by Ali Pekcan.

=== Urdu edition ===
- Sharh al-'Aqidah al-Tahawiyyah, translated with commentary by Ehsanullah Shayeq.
- Al-Aseedah as-Samawiyyah Sharh al-Aqeedah At-Tahawiyyah, translated with commentary by Rida-ul-Haq.
- 'Aqidat al-Tahawi wa al-'Aqidah al-Hasanah, translated by Abd al-Hamid Khan Swati. The book contains two works on aqidah translated and published together due to sharing the same topic. The first is al-'Aqida al-Tahawiyya, and the second is al-Aqidah al-Hasanah of Shah Waliyyullah.

=== Uzbek edition ===
- Aqidatut Tahoviya sharhining talxiysi, Muhammad Anwar Badakhshani's "Talkhees Sharh Al Aqeedah Al-Tahawiyya" translated by Sheikh Muhammad Sadik Muhammad Yusuf.

== See also ==
- Al-Fiqh al-Akbar
- Al-Sawad al-A'zam
- Al-'Aqida al-Nasafiyya
- Kitab al-Tawhid
- List of Sunni books
