= Roudhan Al-Roudhan =

Kuwaiti politician (born 1965)

Roudhan Al-Roudhan is a former member of the Kuwaiti National Assembly, representing the third district. Born in 1965, Al-Roudhan worked in the Municipal Council before being elected to the National Assembly in 2008. Al-Roudhan is considered to be a Conservative deputy.

== Secretary of the Parliament ==
On June 1, Al-Roudhan was elected the National Assembly's secretary, after a draw between him and his opponent Ali Al-Hajri. Two rounds of voting had taken place in which neither succeeded in receiving the required percentage of votes. Al-Roudhan got 32 against 31 for Al-Hajri in the first round, and they tied with 32 votes each in the second round.
