= Alfiyya of Ibn Malik =

Book of Arabic grammar

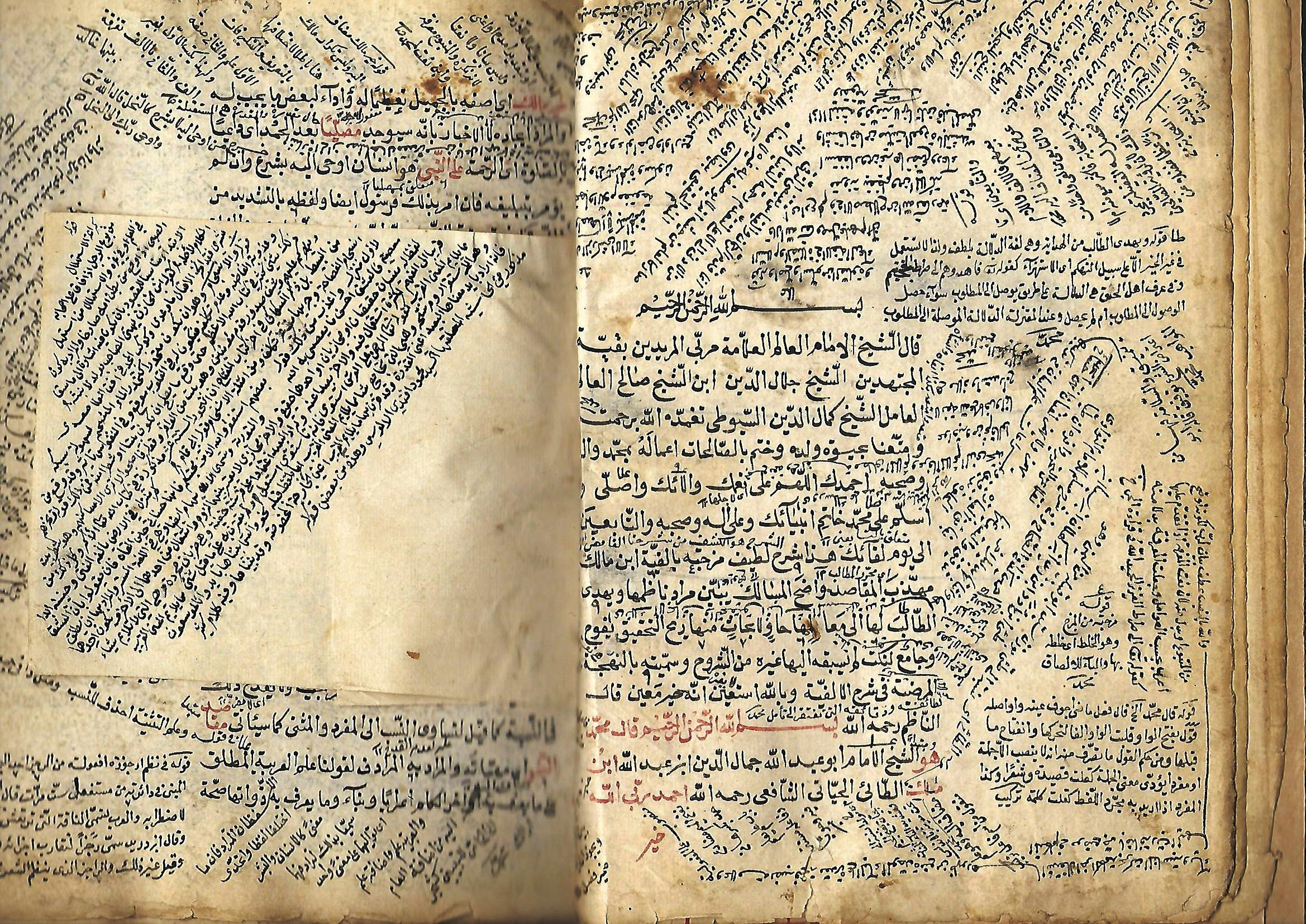
- Author: Ibn Malik
- Language: Arabic
- Genre: Grammar, poem
- Published: 13th century

(The) Alfiya of Ibn Malik (Arabic: ألفية ابن مالك) is a rhymed poetic book of Arabic grammar written by the Muhammad bin Abdullah bin Malik Al-Tai Al-Jiani (Ibn Malik) in the 13th century. This book is one of the most important grammatical and linguistic systems, because it received the attention of scholars and writers who came to comment on it. The long title is al-Khulāsa al-alfiyya (The millennium conclusion). Alfiyyah Ibn Malik was widely accepted by students of Arabic grammar, and they were keen to memorize and explain it more than other grammatical texts, due to its organization, ease of use, and conciseness of grammatical and morphological rules, with a precise arrangement of grammatical topics, and precise citation of each of them. It is taught in many schools and institutes, especially religious and linguistic ones. According to the historian Al-Maqqari, Al-Alfiyya was written in imitation of Ibn Muti al-Zawawi's Al-Durra al-alfiya. At least 43 commentaries have been written on this work, which was one of two major foundations of a beginner's education in Arab societies until the 20th century.

Along with the Ājurrumiya, the Alfiya was one of the first books to be memorized by students in religious schools after the Qur'an.This book is still used in traditional Dars (Islamic Education system in Masjid) at south Indian state Kerala, as well as traditional Islamic boarding schools in Indonesia.

== The naming of the book ==
In recent centuries, the word “millennium” has become widespread in long poems that have approximately one thousand verses, more or less a little. The first to use the word "Al-Alfyyia" was Ibn Muti in his Al-Malifiya called “Al-Durrah Al-Malifiya,” (Millennium pearl) and he mentioned in the last verse of his composition. The word “millennium” was also common in the text of “Al-Khalasa”, and this name came from the fact that its verses are a thousand verses. Ibn Malik mentioned it in his compilation with this name in the third verse. The name “al-Khalasa” is taken from his saying in the last verses.

== The Author ==
Muhammad bin Abdullah bin Muhammad bin Abdullah bin Malik Al-Tai Al-Jiyani, known as Abu Abdullah (The father of Abdullah), who died in the year 672 AH. He is a linguist and grammarian, and one of the most important grammarians in the seventh century. He was born in Andalusia, immigrated to the Levant, settled in Damascus, and wrote many books. He received his education from a number of Andalusian scholars, such as Abu Ali al-Shalubin, then he traveled to the East, landing in Aleppo and gaining more knowledge from Ibn al-Hajib and Ibn Yaish. He was an imam in grammar and language, and a scholar of Arab poetry, recitations, and hadith narration. What is mentioned about him is that he found it easy for him to compose poetry, which made him leave behind numerous poetic compositions, including the Millennium, as well as the Shafiyya Kafiya in Three Thousand Lines and others.

== Ibn Malik's approach in "Alfiyya" ==
- Ibn Malik began his compilations by thanking and praising God, and then he praised the one who preceded him in compilations, namely the compilations of Ibn Muti. After that, Ibn Malik began with the first chapter of grammar, which is the chapter on speech and what it consists of.
- In his "Alfiyyah", Ibn Malik relied on representation in defining grammatical terms and concepts, including his statement in the first verse, in the chapter on speech and what it consists of. Ibn Malik summarized the definition of speech as “useful” and similar to that by saying “go straight.” According to grammarians, speech is a useful expression that is better to stop on:

كَلامُنَا لَفْظٌ مُفِيدٌ كاسْتَقِمْ وَاسْمٌ وَفِعْلٌ ثُمَّ حَرْفٌ الْكَلِمْ

Our speech is useful like "go straight.” A noun, a verb, then the letter of the word.

- Alerting to a few rulings, as Ibn Malik used this style a lot in his compositions, including his saying in the seventy-first verse, as a matter of indefiniteness and definiteness:

قَدْنِي وَقَطْنِي اَلْحَذْفُ أيْضًا قَدْ يَفِي وَفي لَدُنِّي لَدُنِي قَلَّ وَفِي

And in my life, my loyalty is rare Lead me and help me. Deletion may also suffice.

- Pointing out abnormal Arabic grammatical cases, including his saying in the thirty-seventh verse. “Ulu” because there is no single word for it, “Alamun” is the plural of “Alam” and “Alam like a man” is a solid masculine gender noun, “Alyon” is a name for the highest part of Paradise, and it does not have the conditions mentioned because it is for what is incomprehensible, “Ardun” is the plural of “earth” and “earth” is a solid feminine gender noun, “Sunnun” is the plural of “sunna” and “Sunnah” is a feminine gender noun. These are all attached to the masculine plural due to what was mentioned above. It does not fulfill the requirements.:

أُولُو وَعَالَمُونَ عِلّيّونَا وَأَرَضُونَ شَذّ وَالسّنونَا

The people and the worlds are our high ones And the land of Shaz and Al-Sununa

- Pointing out rare cases, including his saying in the sixty-ninth verse, is a matter of indefiniteness and definiteness:

وَلَيْتَني فَشَا وَلَيْتي نَدَرا وَمَعْ لَعَلَّ اعْكِسْ وَكُنْ مُخَيَّرا

I wish I had spread and I wish I had become scarce And perhaps reverse it and have a choice

- Pointing out permissible issues, including his saying in the one hundred and seventy-third verse, is a matter of relative verbs:

وَالْفَتْحَ والْكَسْرَ أَجِزْ فِي السِّيْنِ مِنْ نَحْوِ عَسَيْتُ وَانْتِقَا الْفَتْحِ زُكِنْ

- Alerting about Al-Hassan, including his saying in the sixty-ninth verse, is from the chapter of indefiniteness and definiteness:

أَبٌ أخٌ حَمٌ كَذَاكَ وَهَنُ والنَّقْصُ فِي هذا الأَخِيرِ أَحْسَنُ Father, brother, mother-in-law, such and such. The lack of this latter is better

== The chapters ==
The chapters and chapters of Ibn Malik’s "Alfiyya" are as numerous as the grammar chapters and chapters, and at the same time the length of each chapter or chapter varies according to what it needs of mention and martyrdom. Ibn Malik began his "Alfiyya" with the introduction, which consists of seven verses, in which he begins by introducing himself, and then praises and thanks God Almighty. Followed by blessings upon the Prophet Muhammad, peace and blessings of God be upon him, and seeking help from God, and then he praised the one who preceded him in the systems, which was Ibn Muti’s systems.
