= Ibn Abi al-Izz =

14th-century Islamic scholar

Ibn Abī al-ʻIzz
- ابن أبي العز

Personal life
- Born: 15 September 1331 AD; 12 Dhu al-Hijjah 731 AH Damascus, Mamluk Sultanate (modern-day Syria)
- Died: September 1390 AD (aged 58–59); Dhu al-Hijjah 792 AH Damascus, Mamluk Sultanate (modern-day Syria)
- Region: Syria, Egypt
- Other name: Sadr ad-Dīn Abu'l Ḥasan ʿAlī al-Hanafi

Religious life
- Religion: Islam
- Denomination: Sunni
- Jurisprudence: Hanafi
- Creed: Athari

Muslim leader
- Influenced by: Abu Hanifa, Al-Tahawi, Ibn al-Qayyim, Ibn Kathir

Sadr ad-Dīn Abu'l Ḥasan ʿAlī Ibn Abī al-ʻIzz (Arabic: صَدرُ الدين أبو الحسن عليُّ بن علاءِ الدين الدمشقي الصالحيَّ) was a 14th-century Arab Muslim scholar. He was a jurist of the Hanafi school and was nicknamed Qāḍī al-Quḍāh (the Judge of Judges). He served as a qadi in Damascus and Egypt. Many who have written on his biography mentioned that he had vast knowledge, he had a high status and position, and that he was a Faqeeh (expert in Fiqh). He taught at schools and he assumed the office of judge in Damascus and then in Egypt. He is best known for authoring his magnum opus on al-Tahawi's creedal treatise Al-Aqidah al-Tahawiyyah.

== Biography ==
According to Ibn Hajar al-Asqalani, Ibn Abi al-'Izz was born on 12 Dhu al-Hijjah 1331 AD/731 AH, He came from a family that had been strong supporters of the Hanafi school of jurisprudence. Īmad ad-Dīn Aṭ-Ṭartusī. His grandfather, Shams ad-Dīn (d. 722/1322) was a very distinguished Ḥanafī jurist and served as chief judge. And his great-grandfather, Muḥammad Ibn Abī Al-Īzz, taught at the school of AlMurshidīyyāh. His uncle, Ṣadr ad-Dīn Sulaymān Ibn Abī Al-Īzz (d. 677/1278), was also a great Ḥanafī scholar and writer, and served as chief judge in Syria and Egypt. Sulaymān's descendants also distinguished themselves as judges, muftis and professors

Naturally, he had learned first from his family and seems to have completed his studies with them at an early age. Ibn Qāḍī Shuhbah said that he started teaching at Qīmāzīyyāh School at the age of seventeen in the year 748. This school had been built by Sarim ad-Dīn Qa’imaz, one of the descendants of Ṣalāḥ ad-Dīn AlĀyyūbī, for teaching Ḥanafī fiqh. In 771/1369, Ibn Abī Al-Īzz moved to the Ruknīyyāh School, which was founded in 621 A.H. by Amir Rukn ad-Dīn Mankuras. In 784/1382, he started teaching at the ‘Īzzīyyāh School, founded by Abū Al-Faḍl ‘Īzz ad-Dīn Aybak (d. 645/1249), replacing Qāḍi Al-Ḥammam after the qāḍi's death. Along with teaching, Ibn Abī Al-‘Īzz also delivered sermons at the Afram Mosque (west of Aṣ-Ṣāliḥīyyāh) founded by Amir Jamal ad-Dīn Aqush Al-Afiam in 720/1320, as well as at Al-Ḥusban. Towards the end of 776/1374, he was appointed judge in Damascus in place of Qāḍi Najm ad-Dīn, his cousin, upon the latter's transfer to Egypt. But Najm ad-Dīn resigned three months later and returned to his previous post in Damascus. Ibn Abī Al-Īzz then took over as judge in Egypt, but he also resigned from that post after just two months. Upon returning to Damascus, he resumed teaching at Qīmazīyyāh and also took classes at the Jawharīyyāh School.

Ibn Abī Al-Īzz was born and bred in a family of Ḥanafī scholars and judges. All of the schools wherein he taught were dedicated to the teaching of Ḥanafī fiqh, and the judgeship he served was also that of a Ḥanafī judge. Despite all of that, he was not a blind follower of the Ḥanafī school; in fact, he was opposed to following one imām exclusively or defending the views of one school uncritically. Absolute faith and obedience, he said, is due to the Book of Allāh and the Sunnah of the Prophet (peace be on him). No one is above criticism; everyone's views are to be examined based on the criteria of the Qur'an and Sunnah; if they agree with them, they should be accepted; if they disagree, they are to be rejected. This is the burden of one of his tracts, Al-Ittiba. In it, he reviewed a letter which a contemporary Ḥanafī scholar, Akmal ad-Dīn Muḥammad Ibn Maḥmūd (d. 786/1384) had written, in which he had pleaded for the exclusive following of the Ḥanafī school. Besides objecting, in principle, to this point of view, Ibn Abī Al-Īzz also noted his observations on various issues which the author discussed. He concluded his discussion by saying:

The correct course for a student is to memorize Allāh’s Book and ponder it. Similarly, he should memorize the aḥādīth of the Prophet (peace be on him), as much as he can, and reflect upon them. Furthermore, he should learn Arabic and grammar to the extent that he can express himself correctly and understand the Qur'ān and Sunnah well and also the writings of the Salaf. After this, he should study the views of different scholars, starting with the Companions and then those who came after them, without making any discrimination between them. When they agree on a point, he should stick to it; but when they differ, he should study all the views with an open mind and examine their arguments. Whoever Allāh guides is on the right path and whoever He leaves wandering cannot see the light.

Ibn Abī Al-Īzz was very critical of the practice of establishing schools and colleges and dedicating them to the study of a particular school of fiqh. It then became the duty of the teachers, he observed, to defend each and every view of that school. The students, too, developed the same attitude and bias. Unfortunately, most of the donors whose contributions led to the establishment of those schools had little knowledge and would explicitly leave conditions in their wills or deeds that would restrict the free exercise of intellect and open pursuit of knowledge. Ibn Abī Al-Īzz was of the opinion that such conditions should not be honored since they violate the spirit of the Qur'an and Sunnah. It was against some similar conditions that the Prophet (peace be on him) once said, “What has happened to the people that they come up with conditions that are not mentioned in the Book of Allāh! Know that all the conditions not found in the Book of Allāh, even if they be a hundred conditions, are absolutely null and void.” Ibn Abī Al-Īzz also denounced the practice that restricted judges to making rulings only according to a particular fiqh. The tradition, too, of appointing four imams, one from each school of fiqh, to lead the prayer in the House of Allāh at Makkah, he stated, should be discontinued. There should be, he argued, one imām, and everyone, irrespective of the fiqh school he followed, should pray behind him

== Controversies ==
In the year 784/1382, ‘Alī Ibn Aybak (d. 801/1398-9), a regular poet of Damascus, wrote an ode in praise of the Prophet (peace be on him) in the same meter in which the famous ode “Bānat Su‘ād” was written by Ka‘b Ibn Zuhayr. It was a poem that received general appreciation. It happened that Ibn Abī Al-‘Īzz read it and wrote a letter to the poet stating his appreciation of the literary aspect of the ode. In a separate paper, however, he also noted down his remarks about some of its ideas. Some people objected to this note and raised their voices against Ibn Abī Al-‘Īzz. Ibn Aybak referred the note to some jurists who objected to Ibn Abī Al-Izz’s remarks. The case was brought to the Sultan, who formed a council of scholars and jurists belonging to the different schools and asked for their opinion. The council held many sessions during which it questioned Ibn Abī Al-Īzz and discussed the issue at length. At the end of the fifth session, the council, led by a Shafi'ī judge, convicted Ibn Abī Al-Īzz for his views, consigned him to jail, removed him from his post, and fined him. The fine was later withdrawn but he had to spend fourteen months in jail.

The Shafi'i scholar, al-Hafidh Ibn Hajar al-Asqalani, mentions those contemporaries who refuted Ibn Abi al-Izz when he was summoned to court to defend the matter of his creed;

"He was among the most virtuous people. He suffered an ordeal that was caused by Ali ibn Aybak, the poet, who wrote a Qaseedah Nabawiyah that he opposed."

In all there were eight issues on which Ibn Abī Al-Īzz was convicted. He was accused, for example, of believing that angels are better than prophets. He discussed this issue at length in this Commentary. He opened his discussion of this topic with the following words:

"People have debated the question as to which is superior: angels or human beings that are pious. It is said that the Ahl As-Sunnah believe that pious men, or at least the prophets among them, are superior to the angels. The Mu'tazīlah, on the contrary, believe in the superiority of the angels. This opinion is also held by a group of the Ahl As-Sunnah and the Ṣūfīs. As for the Ash‘arīs, some have no opinion on this issue and others are inclined to believe in the superiority of the angels. Shi‘āh scholars say that all the imams are superior to the angels, and exalted some categories of men over some categories of angels, and viceversa. However, no one worth mention has said that the angels are superior to some prophets rather than others."

He then goes on to say:

“I was very reluctant to discuss this issue, for it does not avail much and is quite insignificant... Moreover, the Shaykh [Aṭ-Ṭaḥāwī] has not touched upon it, either negatively or positively. Probably he deliberately refrained from entering into its discussion. Imam Abū Ḥanīfah, too, kept silent when he was asked about it... Our duty is only to believe in the angels and the prophets. We are not required to believe that one of them is superior to the other. Had it been a duty, there must have been some text to guide us on this issue.”

However, he does enter into a discussion, cites the arguments of those who exalt the angels and of those who exalt the prophets and then concludes,

“In short, this is an unimportant issue and that is why most of the writers on the subject have not discussed it; and Abū Ḥanīfah kept silent concerning it, as we have said before.”

The second issue concerning which he was accused dealt with the possibility of the prophets’ committing minor sins. All scholars of Islam are agreed that the prophets committed no mistakes with respect to communicating to their people what God revealed to them. Similarly, they are agreed that prophets did not commit grave sins. But they differ on the question of whether prophets may commit a small sin sometimes. Ibn Abī Al-Īzz has not discussed this issue in his Commentary. In the note which he wrote on the ode of Ibn Aybak, he upheld the possibility of prophets sometimes committing minor sins by mistake. It seems that those who indicted him even negated this possibility. If that was the case, they were going against the majority opinion. The Salafi scholar Ibn Taymīyyāh wrote: "The view that the prophets do not commit grave sins and that they may commit small sins is the view of most scholars of Islām and most of their followers. One can say that this is the view of the majority of the theologians." Abū Al-Ḥassan Al-Amidī has noted that this is the view of the majority of the Ash'arī theologians as well as the majority of the scholars of Qur'anic exegesis, ḥadīth and fiqh. What has come down from the Salaf, the imams, the Companions, the Successors and their successors, is not different from this view. Qāḍi ‘Ayaḍ, the famous Ash‘arī theologian and Mālikī jurist, wrote in his renowned work, Ash-Shifa.

As for small sins, a group of the Salaf as well as others uphold its possibility. This is also the view of Abū Ja‘far Aṭ-Ṭabarī and other scholars of fiqh, ḥadīth and kalām... Another group has refrained from saying anything positive on this issue. Rationally, it cannot be ruled out that they might commit small sins, but as for textual sources, there is nothing definitive either way. A third group of jurists and theologians uphold their absolute infallibility.

It seems that those who indicted Ibn Abī Al-Īzz on this issue belonged to this third group. The other points on which Ibn Abī Al-Īzz was indicted were problems such as whether it is correct to say, “The Prophet is sufficient for me,” “Prophet, intercede on my behalf,” or “Had the Prophet not been created, the heavens would not have been brought into being.” Concerning the first statement, Ibn Abī Al-Īzz seems to have been inspired by what Ibn al-Qayyīm wrote on this issue in Zād al-Ma‘ād. The second point has been taken up in the Commentary under the discussion of intercession. As for the third statement, Ibn Abī Al-Īzz pointed out that such statements can only be made on the basis of textual sources, and since there were no relevant texts, one should refrain from making such statements.

== Death ==
Some time after Ibn Abī Al-Īzz was released from prison, one of his well-wishers pleaded with the emir, Sayf ad-Dīn Balghuk Ibn 'Abdullah An-Nasīrī, to reinstate him in his position and to restore his stipend. The emir agreed and issued the relevant orders. Ibn Abī Al-Īzz resumed teaching at Jawharīyyāh and delivered sermons in the Mosque of Afram in the month of Rabi‘ al-Awwal in 791/1389.

But this occupation proved to be short-lived; he died in the month of Dhul-Qi‘dah the following year, 792/1390, and was buried in the cemetery of Qasiyun.

== Works ==
Besides the Commentary, which was his magnum opus, he wrote many books, including:

- The Importance of Learning the Creed
- At-Tanbih ‘ala Mushkilat al-Hidayah
- Siḥḥat alIqtiḍa’ bi al-Mukhalif
- Al-Ittiba
- Al-Urjuza al Meemiyyah fi dhikr ashraf al Bariyyah
- at-Tafseer

In At-Tanbih ‘ala Mushkilat al-Hidayah, he is said to have discussed some of the difficult issues of the famous work of Ḥanafī fiqh, Al-Hidayah by Abū Bakr Burhan ad-Dīn ‘Alī Al-Marghinarī (d. 593/1197). No manuscript of this book seems to be extant at the present time. Another tract, Siḥḥat alIqtiḍa’ bi al-Mukhalif, was written to defend the practice of offering prayers behind an imām of a different school. A manuscript of this tract is preserved in the Tatwan Library in Morocco, and a photocopy of it may also be found in the library of the Theologian Ḥammād Al-Anṣāri of Madinah. He also authored another book which is no longer present, An-Nūr alLami‘ fī ma yu‘malu bihī fī al-Jami The title implies that the book is about what one should do in the Mosque of Banū Umayyah in Damascus.
