= Jurjani Definitions =

Book by Ali ibn Mohammed al-Jurjani

A book called Al Taʿrīfāt (التعريفات "The Definitions"), written by Ali ibn Mohammed al-Jurjani (1339–1414), who was a known philosopher, astronomer, theologian, and a linguist. The book contains about 2100 definitions of the most important Arabic terms in Philosophy, Logic, Science, Art, and Religion, written in a glossary style, a list of terms and a few lines definition for each term. There are several version of this book, among them, and maybe the most common versions was published by Dar Al-Kotob AL-Ilmiyah in Lebanon in 1983.

Suggested translation for referencing: Ali ibn Mohammed al-Jurjani: The Definitions (Al Taʿrīfāt). Dar Al-Kotob AL-Ilmiyah, Beirut, Lebanon, 1983.
