= Al-Sharif al-Jurjani =

Persian writer, theologian (1339–1414)

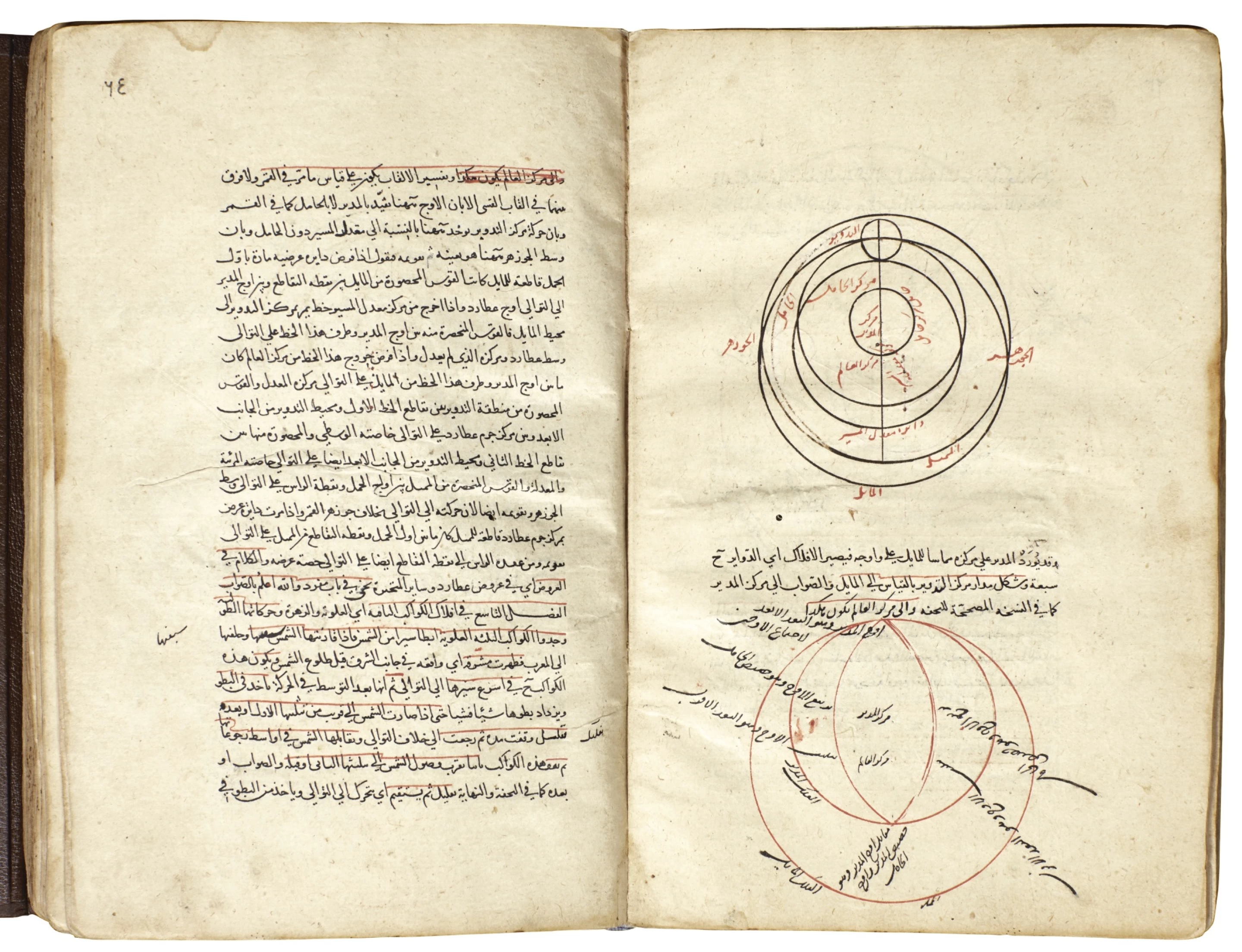
- Manuscript of Jurjani's Sharh Tadkira (a commentary on Nasir al-Din Tusi's Kitab al-tadhkira, on astronomy). Copy created in Timurid Iran, dated 1410. This particular copy is the oldest extant version of the work and was created during Jurjani's lifetime

Personal life
- Born: 1339 CE Ṭāḡu near Astarabad in Gorgān
- Died: 1414 CE Shiraz
- Era: early Timurid period
- Region: Shiraz
- Main interest(s): Kalam((Islamic theology)), Mantiq (logic), Falkiat
- Notable work(s): Jurjani Definitions, Sharh al-Mawaqif

Religious life
- Religion: Islam
- Denomination: Sunni
- Jurisprudence: Hanafi
- Creed: Ash'ari

Muslim leader
- Influenced by: Abu Mansur al-Maturidi, Abu Hasan al-Ash'ari, Adud al-Din al-Iji, Akmal al-Din al-Babarti
- Influenced: Shams al-Din al-Fanari, Ali Qushji

Ali ibn Mohammed al-Jurjani (1339–1414) (Persian علی بن محمد جرجانی) was a Persian encyclopedic writer, scientist, and traditionalist theologian. He is referred to as "al-Sayyid al-Sharif" in sources due to his alleged descent from Ali ibn Abi Taleb. He was born in the village of Ṭāḡu near Astarabad in Gorgan (hence the nisba "Jurjani"), and became a professor in Shiraz. When this city was plundered by Timur in 1387, he moved to Samarkand, but returned to Shiraz in 1405, and remained there until his death.

The author of more than fifty books, of his thirty-one extant works, many being commentaries on other works, one of the best known is the Taʿrīfāt (تعريفات "Definitions"), which was edited by Gustav Flügel (Leipzig, 1845), published also in Constantinople (1837), Cairo (1866, etc.), and St Petersburg (1897).

== See also ==
- List of people from Gorgan
- List of Hanafis
- List of Ash'aris and Maturidis
- List of Muslim theologians
- List of Sufis
