= Sayyid Husayn Ahlati =

Persianate Kurdish Muslim occultist and lettrist (died 1397)

Sayyid Husayn Ahlati or Akhlāṭī (died 1397) was a Persianate Kurdish Muslim occultist, lettrist and personal physician-alchemist to Sultan Barquq who played a pivotal role in the intellectual network which developed a renaissance of occultism in Islam in the late 14th century. Ahlati is also accredited as the author of the geomantic manual Risāla-yi Surḫāb.

== Life ==
Ahlati was an occulist from Ahlat or Tabriz who moved to Mamluk Cairo because of the growing Occultist studies there. Becoming an important figure in the growing studies, he became a worry for anti-occulists like Ibn Khaldun and Ibn al-Qayyim who sharpened their criticism on Ahlati but failed to convince Barquq.

Disciples and students of Ahlati include ibn Turk, Ḥasan Abarqūhī, al-Ḥāǧǧ Ḥasan, Sharaf al-Din Ali Yazdi, Shams al-Din al-Fanari and Šayḫ Badr al-Dīn al-Simāwī. He moreover influenced Jalal al-Din Davani and Mir Damad.
