= List of people from Gorgan =

Following is a list of notable people from Gorgan, the capital of Golestan province in northern Iran.

== Notables from Gorgan ==
=== Contemporary prominent figures ===
- Mohammad Reza Lotfi, Musician.
- Maryam Zandi, Photographer.

=== Historical figures ===
- Abd-al-Qaher Jorjani, Grammarian and literary theorist.
- Mir Damad
- Gorgani, Zayn al-Din Isma‘il ibn, royal physician
- Gorgani, Abu Saeed, astronomer and mathematician
- Gorgani, Rustam, physician
- Masihi Gorgani, Avicenna's master
- Ali ibn Mohammed al-Jurjani, encyclopedic writer and theologian
- Fazlallah Astarabadi, 14th century Islamic mystic and founder of the Hurufi movement
- Bibi Khatoon Astarabadi, a notable writer, satirist, and one of the pioneering figures of the women's movement of Iran

== Famous guests ==
=== Califs ===
- Abbasid Calif Harun Al-Rashid
- Imam Reza
