= Muhammad bin Hadi bin Qarmleh =

- Emir of the Qahtan tribe: 1811 AD–1870 AD (1226 AH - 1287 AH)
- Born: 1790 AD (1205 AH)
- Died: 1870 AD (1287 AH); Najd
- House: al Qarmleh
- Father: Hadi bin Qarmalah
- Occupation: Sheikh, knight, and poet

Muhammad bin Hadi bin Ghanem bin Zaakan bin Ghanem bin Hassan Al-Suhaimi from Al-Jahadir of Qahtan, was a poet, knight, and sheikh of the Qahtan tribe. The sheikh was born in 1205 AH/1790 AD and died in 1287 AH/1870 AD. His father was Hadi bin Qarmleh, and his mother was Qarmleh bint Shaher, one of the Khanafers of Qahtan. He was one of the most important men of the second Saudi state.

== Muhammad bin Hadi and Imam Faisal bin Turki Al Saud ==
Ibn Hadi was denounced by Imam Faisal bin Turki. The Imam's anger came from his attacks on some of the tribes loyal to him. When the news reached Ibn Hadi, he resolved to visit the Imam. They arrived at his council and Ibn Hadi asked him not to acknowledge anything until after they listened some verses. He recounted a clarifying poem, and referred to the positions of his tribe in the House of Saud. He said:

O God, You who drive the scattered clouds,

grant relief to the one who does not yet understand his own deeds.

O Sheikh, do not listen to the words of slanderers, listen to my plea, O source of goodness and generosity.

Even if I were an old man, my actions remain strong, and my people stand with me in ease and in hardship.

We are, to those who provoke you, like towering mountains, and to you, we are more useful and loyal than Anbar and Masoud.

I have a people who guard the borders of your land, on a day of battle, when there is a hunter and the hunted.

We are not among those who fight all tribes blindly, but if you command it, then we are your soldiers.

I have a people not united by temporary alliances, but from the lineage of Qahtan,

traced back to the Prophet Hood..

—

== Najd region ==
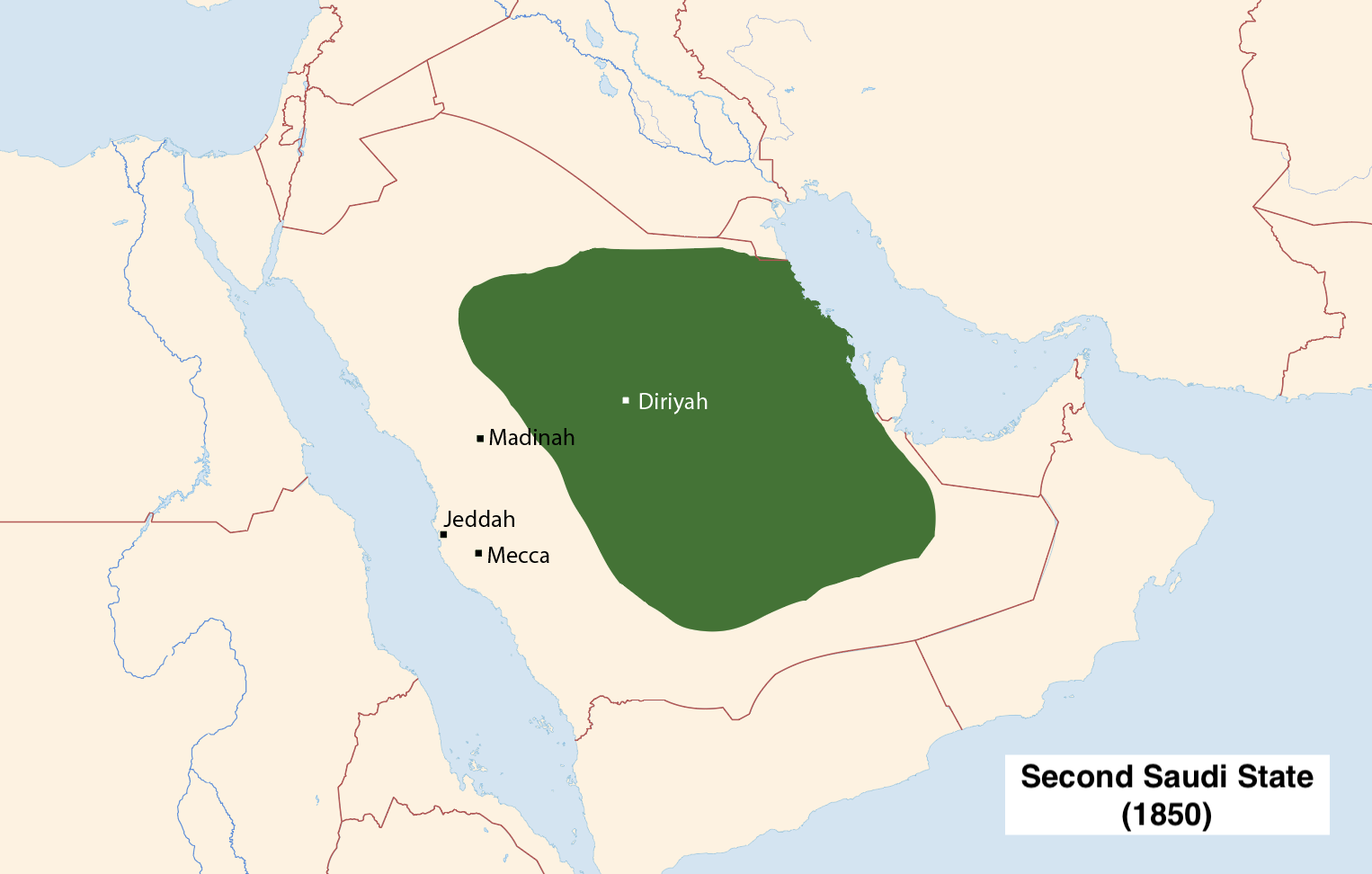
Borders of the Emirate of Nejd by 1850

Bin Hadi gave him authority over the Najd region and was making disloyal tribes pay money to graze in the Najd region.
