= Qahtan (tribe) =

Clan of the Quraysh tribe

Qahtan (Arabic: قحطان)
- Madhhaj, Qahtanites
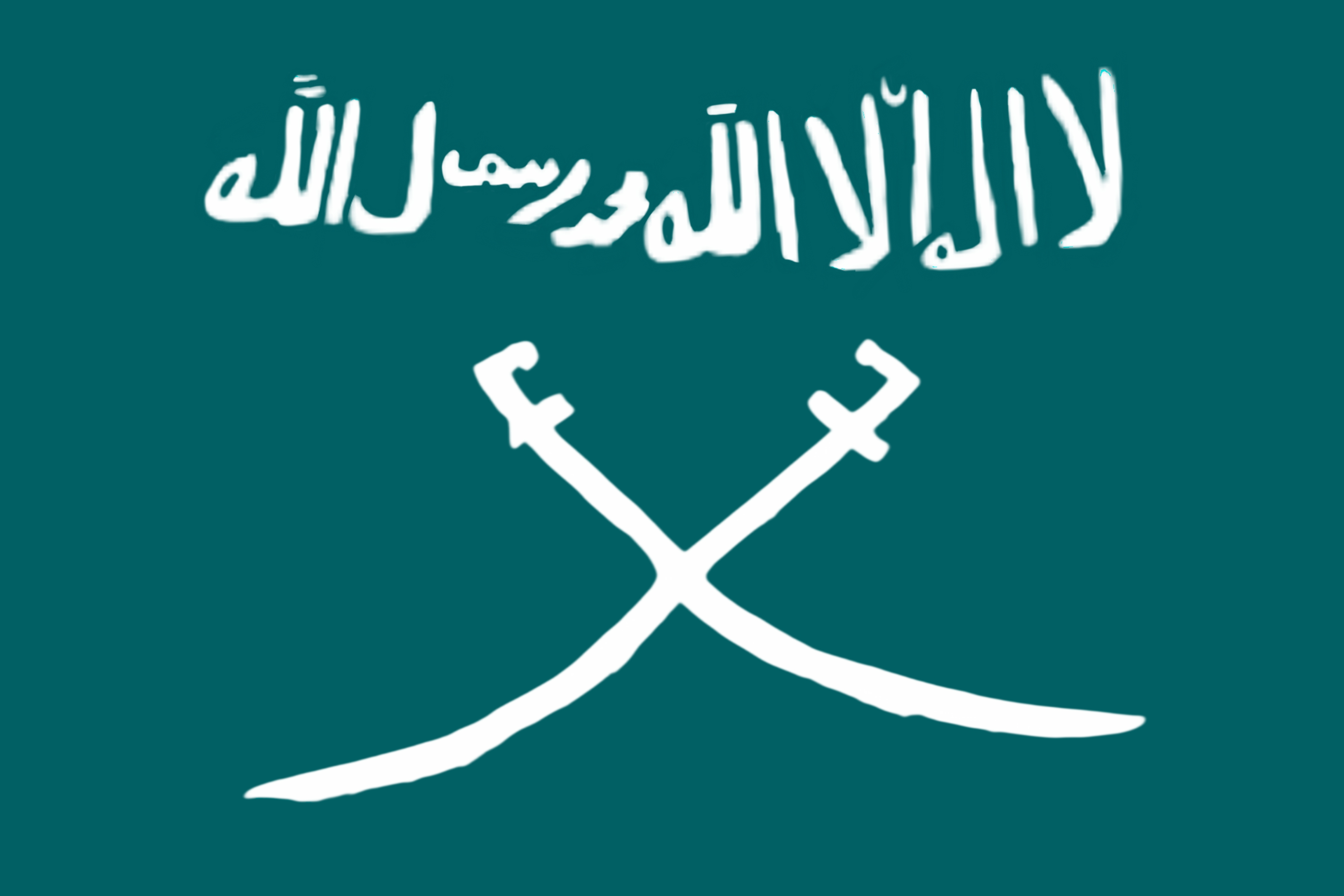
- flag used by Ibn Dulaim, the chief of the Qahtan and Wad’ah tribes, during the wars of unification of Saudi Arabia.
- Ethnicity: Arab
- Nisba: al-Qahtani
- Location: Arabia
- Descended from: Madhhaj ibn Uddad
- Parent tribe: Madhhaj
- Branches: ِAbiidah; Hawajir; al-Habab; Shareef
- Language: Arabic
- Religion: Islam
- Surnames: al-Qahtani

Qahtān (Arabic: قحطان, also spelled القحطاني) is an Arab tribal confederation composed of three main tribes: Sanhan, Junb, and Rufaida. Today, members of the tribe and its sub-tribes are based in Yemen, Saudi Arabia, Oman, Qatar Iraq, Kuwait, and the United Arab Emirates.

== History ==
=== Al Qarmalah ===
The Qahtan tribe enjoyed It settled in one of the Najd regions known as Al-Quwai'iyah and expanded its influence in southern Najd, but Najd is subject to the rule Ibn Saud in the second Saudi state. Several historians have described Qahtan as It became one of the powerful tribes of Najd for a while and then left for its original home in the south.

== Bahrain ==
Bahrain is a Gulf country that houses the tiniest number of Qahtanis compared to other Gulf countries, however, some members of the tribe have taken a relatively prominent role in the country. For example, the head of the Sunni Waqf Endowment Directorate is Rashid al-Hajri, a member of the Bani Hajer. Offshoot Hajri families such Almuhannada also take a public role such as former Member of Parliament Hamad Almuhannadi.

== Notable people ==
- Ali Al-Hajri, Kuwaiti member of the National Assembly
- Nasser Al Hajri, retired Kuwaiti football player
- Saeed al-Hajri, Qatari bowler
- Saud Al Hajiri, Qatari football player
- Abdulkareem Al-Qahtani, Saudi Arabian footballer
- Haji Bakr Al-Qahtani, Saudi Arabian sprinter
- Mesfer Al-Qahtani, Saudi Arabian sprinter
- Muhammad al-Qahtani, Saudi Arabian millennial Salafist anti-government rebel and spiritual leader ("Mahdi") of the 1979 seizure of the Grand Mosque of Mecca
- Nourah al-Qahtani, Saudi Arabian academic and prisoner of conscience
- Saud al-Qahtani, former Advisor of the Saudi Royal court and the former General Supervisor of the Center for Studies and Information Affairs at minister rank.
- Yasser al-Qahtani, Saudi Arabian footballer
- Muhammad bin Hadi bin Qarmalah, the old sheikh of the Qahtan tribe
