= Association of Islamic Charitable Projects of North America =

Islamic organization based in the United States

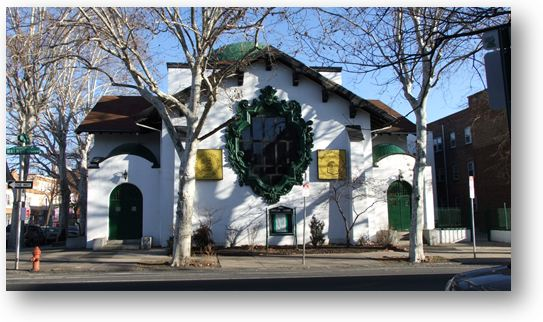
The North American Headquarters of the Association of Islamic Charitable Projects located in Philadelphia, Pennsylvania.

The Association of Islamic Charitable Projects (AICP) is a religious organization committed to teaching Islam along with social responsibility. It sponsors schooling from preschool through secondary education, both secular and religious education. Their values include moderation, cooperation, and wisdom. Their goal is to teach towards good to benefit all societies. AICP strives to encourage Muslims to correct wrongs within society while continuing to function within society. This mosque is part of the growing Muslim population within the demographics of Philadelphia. The AICP is located at 4431 Walnut Street in Philadelphia, Pennsylvania.

== See also ==
- Al-Ahbash
