= Abu al-Baqa ar-Rundi =

Arab poet, writer and literary critic

Abu Muhammad Salih b. Abi Sharif ar-Rundi (Note: Lisan ad-Din Ibn al-Khatib gives his name as 'Abu at-Tayyib' in his الإحاطة في أخبار غرناطة, while Ahmad al-Maqqari gives his name as Abu al-Baqa in his نفح الطيب من غصن الأندلس الرطيب. The latter has become the common name, but 'Abu at-Tayyib' is probably the correct one as Ibn al-Khatib lived closer in time to the poet.) (Arabic: أبو البقاء الرندي; 1204–1285) or Abu-l-Tayyib/ Abu-l-Baqa Salih b. Sharif al-Rundi was a poet, writer, and literary critic from al-Andalus who wrote in Arabic. His fame is based on his nuniyya entitled "رثاء الأندلس" Rithaa' ul-Andalus (Elegy for al-Andalus), a poem mourning the Catholic invasion and conquest of al-Andalus.

== Biography ==
He was born in Sevilla in 1204 and fled that town in 1248 and lived in Ceuta until his death in 1285. ar-Rundi wrote a handbook on poetry entitled al-Wafi fi Natham al-Qawafi (الوافي في نظم القوافي).

== Sources ==
- Maya Shatzmiller, L'historiographie Mérinide. Ibn Khaldun et ses contemporains, Leiden, 1982
- Abd Allah Kanun, Abu l-Baqa al-Rundi
  - Zubair Mohammad Ehsanul Hoque, Elegy for lost kingdoms and ruined cities in Hispano-Arabic poetry article, 2007
