= Al-Tahawi =

Egyptian Islamic jurist and theologian (853–933)

Aṭ-Ṭaḥāwī ٱلطَّحَاوِيّ
- Title: Imam faqih Muḥaddith

Personal life
- Born: 853 CE / 239 AH; Taha al-Amidah, Abbasid Caliphate
- Died: 5 November 933 CE / 14 Dhul Qa’ada 321 AH; Cairo, Abbasid Caliphate
- Era: Abbasid Caliphate
- Main interest(s): Islamic jurisprudence, Islamic theology, Hadith
- Relatives: Al-Muzani (Maternal Uncle)

Religious life
- Religion: Islam
- Denomination: Sunni
- Jurisprudence: Hanafi (formerly Shafi'i)
- Creed: Athari

Muslim leader
- Influenced by: Abu Hanifa, Abu Yusuf, Muhammad al-Shaybani
- Influenced: Hanafis

Abū Jaʿfar Aḥmad aṭ-Ṭaḥāwī (Arabic: أَبُو جَعْفَر أَحْمَد ٱلطَّحَاوِيّ, romanized: Abū Jaʿfar Aḥmad aṭ-Ṭaḥāwī) (853 – 5 November 933), commonly known as at-Tahawi (Arabic: ٱلطَّحَاوِيّ, romanized: aṭ-Ṭaḥāwī), was an Egyptian Arab Hanafi jurist and Traditionalist theologian. He studied with his uncle al-Muzani and was a Shafi'i jurist, before then changing to the Hanafi school. He is known for his work al-'Aqidah al-Tahawiyyah, a summary of Sunni Islamic creed which influenced Hanafis in Egypt.

== Name ==
According to al-Dhahabi, his name was Abu Ja'far Ahmad ibn Muhammad ibn Salamah ibn 'Abd al-Malik ibn Salamah, al-Azdi al-Hajari al-Misri al-Tahawi al-Hanafi.

== Biography ==
Aṭ-Ṭaḥāwī was born in the village of Ṭaḥā in upper Egypt in 853 (239 AH). However, this birthdate is highly debated. The years 229 AH/843 AD, 230/844, 238/852, and 239/853 are all dates that have been mentioned. Even within the years of birth, the exact dates are debated as well. Another date within 239 AH/853 AD that is presented is the 10th of Rabī‘ al-Awwal, which would be August 19, 853 AD. Another author adds that his birth was on Sunday night, 11 of the First Rabi‘. The biography of ibn Khallikān mentions that 229 AH, the date reported by Abu Sa‘d al-Sam‘ānī’s, is correct. However, the majority of biographers say that it was the year 239, which is determined by narrations directly from Ibn Yūnus, his student, and the year 239 is explicitly mentioned in al-Sam‘ānī’s own work, al-Ansāb, further indicates that the report citing the year 229 likely stems from a scribal error.

He was born to an affluent Arab family of Azdī origins, which is a renowned tribe in Yemen. His grandfather served as an army commander, while his father was engaged in the fields of poetry and literature. Al-Ṭaḥāwī even consulted his father’s expertise in verifying poetry within his own work, Sharh Ma'ani al-Athar. His mother attended the scholarly gatherings of Imam Shafi'i, and al-Rafi'i cited her as a source regarding the subject of zakat. He then began his studies with his maternal uncle, Ismāʿīl ibn Yaḥyā al-Muzanī, a leading disciple of ash-Shāfiʿī, but in 873 (259 AH), at approximately 20 years of age, aṭ-Ṭaḥāwī abandoned the Shāfiʿī school of jurisprudence in favour of the Ḥanafī school. Different versions are given by his biographers of his conversion to the Ḥanafī school, but the most probable reason seems to be that the system of Abū Ḥanīfa appealed to his critical insight more than that of ash-Shāfiʿī. However, other reasons are given as to why he switched over. One is that he was influenced by al-Muzani's comments, who said to him one day, “By God! No good will ever come of you.’’ Al-Ṭaḥāwi switched over to Abi Ja'far ibn Abi ‘Imran after these comments upset him. Another reason, related by Muḥammad ibn Aḥmad al-Shurūṭi, is that he asked him why he differed in opinion from his uncle and preferred Aba Ḥanifah’s way, to which al-Ṭaḥāwi replied, "Because I saw my uncle examine the works of Aba Ḥanifah. Thus, I switched over to him."

Aṭ-Ṭaḥāwī then studied under the head of the Ḥanafīs in Egypt, Aḥmad ibn Abī ʿImrān al-Ḥanafī, who had himself studied under the two primary students of Abū Ḥanīfa, Abū Yūsuf and Muḥammad ash-Shaybānī. Aṭ-Ṭaḥāwī then travelled to Syria in 882 (268 AH) for further studies in Ḥanafī jurisprudence and became pupil to Abū Khāzim ʿAbd al-Ḥamīd ibn ʿAbd al-ʿAzīz, the chief qāḍi of Damascus.

Aṭ-Ṭaḥāwī gained a vast knowledge of ḥadīth in addition to Ḥanafī jurisprudence and his study circles consequently attracted many students of knowledge who related ḥadīth from him and transmitted his works. Among them were al-Da'udi, the head of the Zahiris in Khurasan, and aṭ-Ṭabarānī, well known for his biographical dictionaries of ḥadīth transmitters.

Aṭ-Ṭaḥāwī was famed for his expertise in both ḥadīth and Ḥanafī jurisprudence even during his own lifetime, and many of his works, such as Kitāb Maʿāni al-Āthār and ʿAqīdah aṭ-Ṭaḥāwīyyah, continue to be held in high regard by Sunni Muslims today.

He died on the 14th day of Dhū-l Qaʿdah, 321 AH (5 November 933 CE), and was buried in al-Qarāfah, Cairo. Another date given for his death was Thursday, 1st of Dhu ’I-Qa‘adah, 321 (A. D 933)

== Legacy ==
Many of al-Ṭaḥāwī's contemporaries praised him and noted him as both a reliable scholar and narrator of ḥadīth. He was widely held as a distinguished and prolific writer and became known as the most learned faqīh amongst the Ḥanafīs in Egypt, despite having knowledge of all the madhāhib. Over fifteen commentaries have been produced on his creedal treatise, ʿAqīdah aṭ-Ṭaḥāwīyyah, including shuruh (commentaries) by the Hanafi jurist Ismail ibn Ibrahim al-Shaybani and the Taymiyyan-inclined Ibn Abi al-Izz.

An examination of the works of al-Ṭaḥāwī's—who lived during a period when āḥadīth and the sciences of āḥadīth were being systematically compiled—reveals that he was an authoritative figure in subjects such as nāsikh wa mansūkh (abrogating and abrogated Hadiths), ‘ilal al-hadīth (defects in Hadith), gharīb al-hadīth (obscure Hadith terms), ta’wīl mukhtalif al-hadīth (reconciling conflicting Hadiths), and jarḥ wa ta‘dīl (criticism and authentication of narrators). The characterization of him as "trustworthy and reliable" (thiqa wa sabt) by his student—the Hadith memorizer, Abu Sa‘id ibn Yunus—was accepted by the majority of later Hadith scholars. Imam al-Nawawi referred to him as "the Imam of the Hanafis in Hadith".

== Works ==
He authored many other works, close to forty different books, some of which are still available today, including:

- Sharh Ma'ani al-Athar (شرح معاني الآثار)
- Sharh Mushkil al-Athar (شرح مشكل الآثار)
- al-ʿAqīdah aṭ-Ṭaḥāwīyyah (العقيدة الطحاوية)
- Aḥkām al-Qur’ān al-Karīm (أحكام القرآن الكريم)
- Mukhtasar al-Tahawi (المختصر في الفروع)
- Sharḥ al-Jāmiʿ al-Kabīr (شرح الجامع الكبير)
- Sharḥ al-Jāmiʿ aṣ-Ṣaghīr (شرح الجامع الصغير)
- Ash-Shurūṭ aṣ-Ṣaghīr (الشروط الصغير)
- Ash-Shurūṭ al-Kabīr (الشروط الكبير)
- Ikhtilāf al-ʿUlamā’ (إختلاف العلماء)
- ʿUqūd al-Marjān fī Manāqib Abī Ḥanīfa an-Nuʿmān (عقود المرجان في مناقب أبي حنيفة النعمان)
- Tārīkh al‑Kabīr (تاريخ الكبير)
- Ḥukm Arāḍi Makkah al-Mukarramah (حكم أراضي مكة المكرمة)

== See also ==
- Islamic scholars
