= Francisco Codera y Zaidín =

Spanish arabist and professor (1836–1917)

Francisco Codera
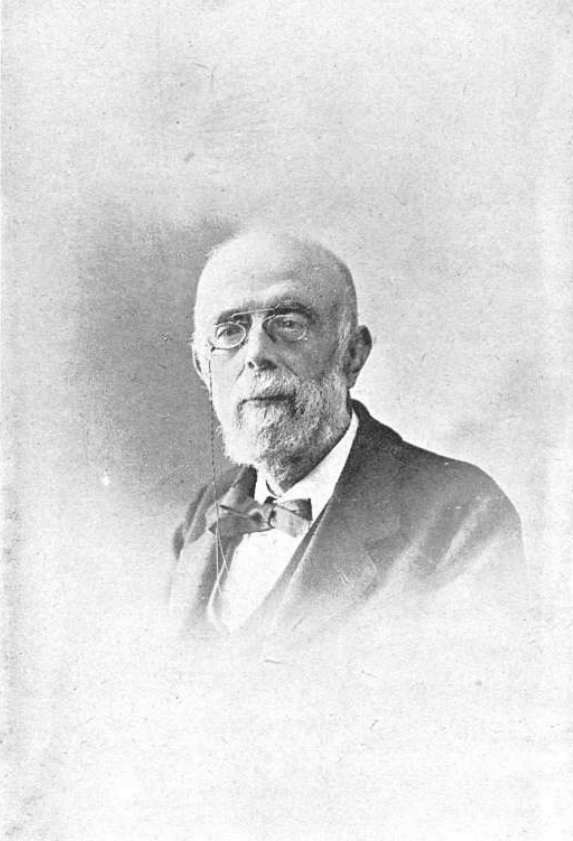
- Codera Zaidin, c. 1904
- Born: Francisco Codera y Zaidín; 23 June 1836; Huesca, Spain
- Died: 6 November 1917 (aged 81); Huesca, Spain

Academic work
- Notable works: Biblioteca arabigohispana, Estudios de historia arábigo-española, Decadencia y Desaparición de los Almorávides en España, etc.

Seat h of the Real Academia Española
- In office 15 May 1910 – 6 November 1917
- Preceded by: Manuel del Palacio
- Succeeded by: Carlos Cortezo

Francisco Codera y Zaidín (Huesca, Spain, 23 June 1836 – 6 November 1917) was a Spanish historian, philologist and Arabist scholar. Among his students, known in the academic field as the Beni Codera, were Arabists Rafael Altamira and José Deleito.

== Life ==
Codera Zaidín was a Professor of Greek, Hebrew and Arabic respectively in Granada, Zaragoza and the Central University,. As the principal student of Pascual Gayangos, he was an outstanding Arabist and succeeded him to the chair of Arabic at the Central University. He was appointed a permanent member of the Real Academia de la Historia on 20 April 1879. He was a language academic at the Royal Spanish Academy from 1910.

== Works ==
Rigorously positivist, his works generally focus on historiographic sources of Arab origin (Estudios de historia arábigo-española, Decadencia y Desaparición de los Almorávides en España, 1899, reissued with an important introductory study by María Jesús Viguera Molins in 2004). His works include Tratado de numismática arabigoespañola ('Treaty of Arabo-Spanish Numismatics'), (1879); Estudios críticos de Historia árabe española ('Critical Studies of Spanish Arab History') (1917, 2 vols.) and above all, his monumental Biblioteca arabigohispana ('Arab-Hispanic Library') (1882–1895, 10 vols.).

He also contributed to scholarship in Aragonese phonetics and promoted Arabic studies in Spain. He retired to his native town of Fonz, in the province of Huesca, to devote himself to his scholarly studies and the writing of treaties on agriculture. His students include Julián Ribera. His archive is conserved at the "Biblioteca de la Universidad Nacional de Educación a Distancia" (UNED).

== See also ==
- Encyclopædia Britannica Online

== Bibliography ==
- Ágreda, Fernando de (2008), "New and old sources on the "Beni Codera"" (PDF), Miscellaneous Arab and Hebraic Studies. Arab-Islam Section, 57, Granada: University of Granada: 425–450, ISSN 0544-408X
- Martín Escudero, Fatima; Cepas, Adela; Canto García, Alberto (2004). Archive of the National Cabinet: catalog and indexes. Madrid: Royal Academy of History. ISBN 8495983362.
- Pasamar Alzuria, Gonzalo; Peiró Martín, Ignacio (2002). Akal Dictionary of Contemporary Spanish Historians. Tres Cantos: Akal Editions. ISBN 84-460-1489-0.
- Viguera, María Jesús (2009), "Al-Andalus and Spain. On the essentialism of the Beni Codera", Al-Andalus/Spain. Contrasting Historiographies: Centuries Xvii-xxi, In: Manuela Marín (Dir), Madrid: Casa de Velázquez, pp. 67–82, ISBN 9788490961261
- Monroe, James T (1970). Islam and the Arabs in Spanish Scholarship (Sixteenth Century to the Present). Medieval Iberian peninsula. Texts and studies, 0076-6100. Vol. 3. Leiden: Brill.
- Manzanares de Cirre, Manuela. Arabistas españoles del siglo XIX. Madrid: Instituto Hispano-Árabe de Cultura. OCLC 5077073.
- Codera y Zaidín, Francisco (2004). Viguera Molins, Mª Jesús (ed.). Decadencia y desaparición de los Almorávides de España (in Spanish). Pamplona: Urgoiti. ISBN 84-933398-2-2.
