= Mohamed Ahmed Al-Hajri =

Yemeni historian and genealogist (1889–1960)

- محمد بن أحمد الحجري
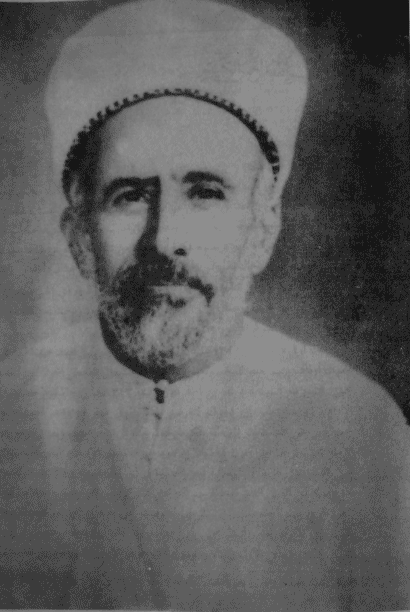
- Born: 1889; Mikhlaf Khuban region, Ibb, Yemen
- Died: 1960 (aged 70–71)
- Occupation(s): Historian, genealogist
- Notable work: Majmūʻ buldān al-Yaman wa-qabāʾilihā

Mohamed bin Ahmed Al-Hajri, sometimes spelled Muḥammad ibn Aḥmad Hajrī, (Arabic: محمد بن أحمد الحجري; 1889 –1960) was a Yemeni historian, genealogist and judge. He wrote books on Yemeni history and tribes.

== Works ==
- Majmūʻ buldān al-Yaman wa-qabāʾilihā, 3 volumes, مجموع بلدان اليمن وقبائلها
- Summary of the History of Yemen, 2007
- Mosques of Sanaa
