= Shams al-Din al-Fanari =

Ottoman logician and Islamic theologian (1350–1431)

Shams ad-Dīn Muhammad ibn Hamzah al-Fenārī, Molla Fenârî

Personal life
- Born: 751/1350 Bursa, Ottoman Empire
- Died: 834/1431 Bursa, Ottoman Empire
- Era: 15th century
- Notable work(s): Fuṣūl al-Badāʼiʻ fī uṣūl al-Sharāʼi, Miṣbāḥ al-Uns, Al-Feva'id al-Fenariyye
- Occupation: Theologian, Grand Mufti

Religious life
- Religion: Islam
- Denomination: Sunni
- Jurisprudence: Hanafi
- Tariqa: Akbariyya

Muslim leader
- Influenced by: Ibn Arabi, Qunawi

Mulla Shams ad-Din Muhammad ibn Hamzah al-Fanari (Arabic: محمد بن حمزة الفناري, Turkish: Molla Şemseddin Mehmed Fenari), 1350–1431, known in short as Molla Fenari was an Ottoman logician, Islamic theologian, Islamic legal scholar, and mystical philosopher of the school of Ibn ʿArabī.

== Biography ==
Fanari's family history and his birthplace are not well known. His nasab, 'Fanari', has been explained in different ways in the sources. It has variously been related to a town in Transoxiana, to a town near Bursa in Anatolia and to his father's profession as a lamp maker. He studied under Mevlânâ Alâuddîn Esved, Cemâleddîn Aksarâyî, Hamîduddîn-i Kayserî. He traveled to Egypt, which was then under the rule of the Mamluk Sultanate, to study Hanafi jurisprudence under Ekmeleddîn el-Bâberti. Ottoman Sultan Bayezid I subsequently appointed Fanari judge (qadi) of Bursa in 1390. The death of Bayezid I precipitated a civil war, which caused Fanari to leave the country, after which he lectured in Egypt and in Hejaz (part of present-day Saudi Arabia). He thereafter sought employment in the court of the ruler of the Karamanoğlu Beylik, where he wrote his text on legal theory. In 1421, Murad II ascended the throne as the sixth Ottoman Sultan and recalled Fanari to the court in Bursa. In 1424 Murad appointed him as the qādī of the military, a position which would evolve over the next century into the Sheikh ul-Islam. Fanari held this position in addition to his other positions as professor and judge. He retained all three positions until the end of his life in Bursa in 1431.

== Works ==
During his career, he specialized in logic and jurisprudence. His work on logic was reputed throughout the Islamic world. Some of his major writings are:

- Sarh al-Isaguji or Al-Feva'id al-Fenariyye: Commentary on Athīr al-Dīn al-Abharī's famous Isāghūjī fi al-Manṭiq.
- Miṣbāḥ al-Uns: Commentary on Sadr al-Din al-Qunawi's Miftāḥ al-Ghayb.
- Fuṣūl al-Badāʼiʻ fī uṣūl al-Sharāʼi: A work in Uṣūl al-fiqh (Principles of Islamic jurisprudence).
- Risāle der Tasavvuf: A short treatise on sufism in Persian

Unmudhaj al-Ulum, which in some sources has been attributed to Muhammad ibn Hamzah al-Fanari, was in fact authored by his son Muhammad Shah al-Fanari.

== See also ==
- Ibn Arabi
- Akmal al-Din al-Babarti
- Mehmed the Conqueror
- Khidr Bey
- Ibn Kemal
- Ebussuud Efendi
- Muhammad Zahid al-Kawthari
- Muhammed Hamdi Yazır
- List of Sufis
- List of Hanafis
- List of Ash'aris and Maturidis
- List of Muslim theologians
- Sayyid Husayn Ahlati
