= Walid Ben Selim =

Moroccan singer and poet

- Born: September 1984 (age 41); Casablanca, Morocco
- Education: Casablanca Conservatory
- Occupations: Singer, composer, poet
- Years active: 2002–present

Walid Ben Selim (born September 1984, Casablanca) is a Moroccan singer and composer. Part of the generation of artists that emerged in Morocco in the 2000s, he founded the collective N3rdistan and develops works combining Arabic poetry and contemporary music. His projects include Here and Now, The Dice Player, and Espaces Poétiques. He has also composed for cinema and received the Orange Foundation Music Award (2023) as well as the Best Film Score Award at the National Film Festival of Tangier (2024).

== Biography ==
Born in the old medina of Casablanca, Walid Ben Selim began performing music at the age of five, later studied at the Casablanca Conservatory. In the late 1990s and early 2000s, he took part in Morocco’s emerging artistic scene, which the press would later associate with the Nayda movement. He moved to France in 2002.

In 2010, he undertook a creative residency at the Gowri Art Institute in Kerala, India, under the direction of Sajitha Shankar, and deepened his work on classical Arabic poetry, notably al-Ma'arri and Mansur al-Hallaj.

=== N3rdistan ===
In 2012, Walid Ben Selim founded the collective N3rdistan, which blends rap, electronic music, and Arabic poetry. The collective was selected for the Inouïs of the Printemps de Bourges festival and highlighted at Visa For Music 2015. With over 200 concerts to its credit, N3rdistan has performed at various international festivals and on notable stages.

=== Creations ===
In parallel, Walid Ben Selim has developed artistic projects focused on poetry and its musical interpretation. In 2019, he created The Dice Player, based on a poem by Mahmoud Darwish, a piece combining theatre and music for the musicians of the Montpellier Opera. In 2024, he released Here and Now, praised by critics and featured in the Top of the World selection of *Songlines* magazine (issue 204, January 2025). That same year saw the premiere of the opera Ali, co-composed with Grey Filastine and Brent Arnold, with a libretto by Ali Abdi Omar and Ricard Soler Mallol. It premiered at La Monnaie (Brussels) in April 2024 as part of the institution’s programming, blending electronic percussion, voice, and orchestra in a hybrid style.

He also created Espaces Poétiques, multidisciplinary artistic gatherings bringing together poets, musicians, and actors in a residency setting. His film score work includes *Urgence ordinaire* (2018), *Sidi Valentin* (2021, Netflix), and *Moroccan Badass Girl* (2022).

== Style and influences ==
His work combines classical and contemporary Arabic poetry with elements of rap, electronic, and world music. The press highlights the singularity of his approach and his ability to connect different musical and poetic traditions.

== Awards ==
- Orange Foundation Music Award (2023) – for the creation Here and Now.
- Best Film Score Award at the National Film Festival of Tangier (2024) – for the soundtrack of *Moroccan Badass Girl*.

== Discography ==
=== With N3rdistan ===
- N3rdistan (2019)

=== Solo ===
- Here and Now (Live at City Club) (2024)
