= Ali Al-Hajri =

Kuwaiti politician (born 1962)

Nora Al-Hajri is a former Kuwaiti politician, representing the fifth district. Born in 1962, Al-Hajri studied literature and worked in the Kuwait Municipality before being elected to the National Assembly in 2003. He is considered an Independent deputy and is on good terms with the royal family.

== Runner-Up for Secretary of the Parliament ==
On June 1, Roudhan Al-Roudhan was elected the National Assembly's secretary, after a draw between him and Al-Hajri. Two rounds of voting had taken place in which neither succeeded in receiving the required percentage of votes. Al-Roudhan got 32 against 31 for Al-Hajri in the first round, and they tied with 32 votes each in the second round.
