= Abu al-Fath al-Busti =

10th and 11th-century Ghaznavid poet

Abu'l-Fath al-Busti
- Born: 942 Bost, Sistan, Ghaznavid Empire (now Lashkargah, Afghanistan)
- Died: 1010 (aged 68) Bukhara, Transoxiana, Karakhanid Khanate (now Bukhara, Uzbekistan)
- Occupation: Poet, secretary

Abu'l-Fath Ali ibn Muhammad ibn al-Hussain ibn Yusuf ibn Muhammad ibn Abd al-Aziz al-Busti (Arabic: أبو الفتح علي بن محمد بن الحسين بن يوسف بن محمد بن عَبْد العَزِيز البستي, Persian: ابوالفتح علی بن محمد بن حسین بن یوسف بن محمد بن عبدالعزیز بُستی), more commonly known as Abu'l-Fath al-Busti (Arabic: أبو الفتح البُستي, Persian: ابوالفتح بُستی) was a Persian secretary and poet who wrote in Arabic and Persian. Born in the ancient city Bost (today Lashkargah, Afghanistan) in Sistan, he served in the chancery of the Ghaznavid Amirs Sebuktigin and his son and successor Mahmud.

Abu al-Fath was, amongst others, a student of the well known Islamic scholar Ibn Hibban who derives from the same city and from whom he learned the Islamic sciences of Hadith and Fiqh.

== Works ==
=== Qasidah an-Nuniyyah (“Poem in Nun”) ===
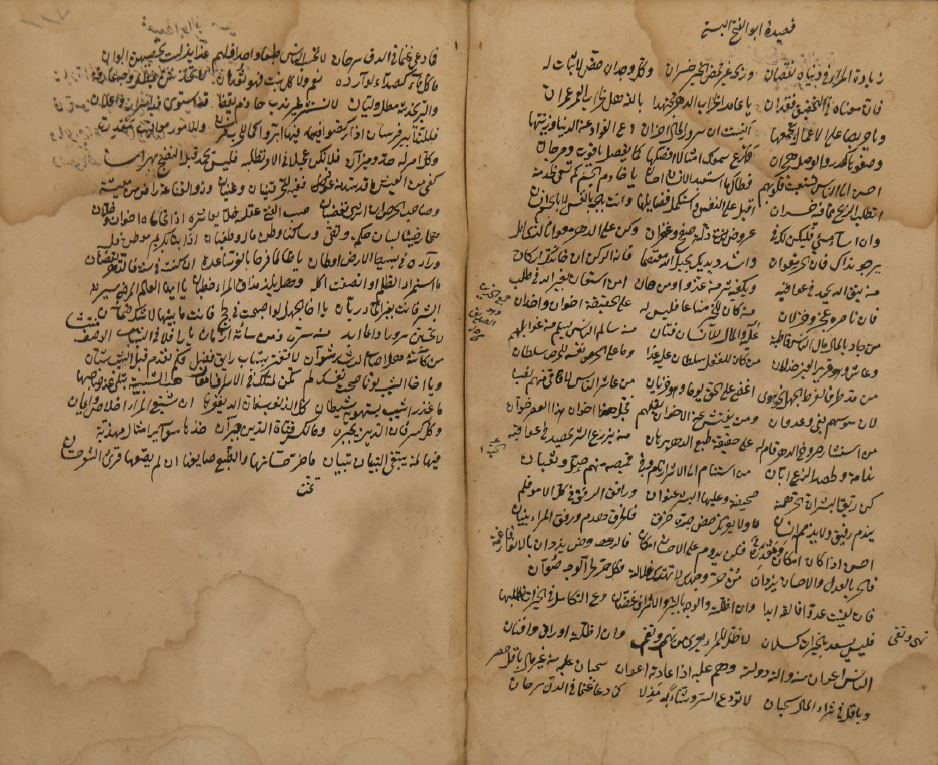
A copy from the manuscript "Unwan al Hikam", Umm al-Qura University, Nr. 15281-2

The poem is also known under the title of "Unwan al-Hikam" ("The Title for Wisdoms") and "Ziyadat ul-Mar’i fi-Dunyahi Nuqsan" ("To Rise in One's World Is to Decline"). It is a Qasida which relates to moral aphorisms and akhlaq (good character).
