= Nasser Al Hajri =

Kuwaiti footballer

Personal information
- Full name: Nasser Abdullah Deghaim Al Hajri
- Date of birth: 1 October 1981 (age 45)
- Place of birth: Kuwait City, Kuwait
- Height: 1.89 m (6 ft 2 1/2 in)
- Position: Left back

Team information
- Current team: Al Salibikhaet

Senior career*
Years	Team	Apps	(Gls)
1997–2008	Al Naser		
2008–2010	Al Salmiya		
2011	Borac Banja Luka		
2011–2013	Al Salibikhaet		
2013–2015	Al Naser		
2015	Al Salibikhaet		

International career^{‡}
1999	Kuwait U18		
2003	Kuwait U23		
2005–2007	Kuwait	6	(0)
- * Club domestic league appearances and goals as of November 26, 2010 ‡ National team caps and goals as of November 26, 2010

Nasser Al Hajri (Arabic: ناصر الهاجري; born 1 October 1981) is a retired Kuwaiti footballer. He played for Al Salibikhaet.

He had six appearances for the Kuwaiti national team.
