= Abu Nasr al-Jawhari =

Arabic lexicographer

- ابو نصرإسماعيل بن حماد الجوهري
- Born: Abu Nasr Isma'il ibn Hammad al-Jawhari (or al-Jauhari); Otrar, Transoxiana (now Kazakhstan)
- Died: 1002 or 1008; Nishapur, Abbasid Caliphate (now Iran)
- Occupations: Lexicographer, writer
- Known for: Wrote al-Ṣiḥāḥ fī al-Lughah

Abu Nasr Isma'il ibn Hammad al-Jawhari (ابو نصرإسماعيل بن حماد الجوهري) also known as Imam al-Jauhari (died 1002 or 1008) was a medieval lexicographer and the author of a notable Arabic dictionary al-Ṣiḥāḥ fī al-Lughah (الصحاح في اللغة).

== Life ==
He was born in the city of Farab (Otrar) in Transoxiana (in today's southern Kazakhstan). He began his studies of the Arabic language in Farab, then studied in Baghdad, continuing among the Arabs of the Hejaz, then moving to northern Khurāsān, first to Damghan before settling finally at Nishapur. It was here that he met his death in a failed attempt at flight from the roof of a mosque, possibly due to delusions of being a bird. He was the second person to have attempted after Abbas Ibn Firnas.

== Works ==
- Taj al-Lugha wa Sihah al-Arabiya (الصحاح تاج اللغة وصحاح العربية) "The Crown of Language and the Correct Arabic" - His magnum opus dictionary of Arabic; often abbreviated as al-Sihah fi al-Lugha, "The Correct Language", and al-Sihah (الصحاح). It contains about 40,000 dictionary entries. Written in Nishapur, it was incomplete at his death and completed by a student. Al-Jawhari uses an alphabetical ordering system with the last letter of a word's root being the first ordering criterion. Al-Sihah is a principal Arabic dictionary of the medieval era and later compilers of Arabic dictionaries incorporated its material. Over the centuries several abridgements and elaborations in Arabic were produced and a large portion was copied into the huge 13th century dictionary compilation Lisan al-Arab; published online at http://www.baheth.info. A fully searchable online edition available at Baheth.info.
- Edition begun by E. Scheidius with a Latin translation, but one part only appeared at Harderwijk (1776).
- Complete edition, Tabriz (1854).
- Complete edition, Cairo (1865).
- Many abridged and Persian language editions.

In 1729 Ibrahim Muteferrika's Arabic-Turkish dictionary, based on Jawhari's, became the first book to be printed by the printing press of Ottoman era.
