= Ibn Malik =

Andalusian grammarian and philologist (1203–1274)

Imām Ibn Mālik
- ابن مالك
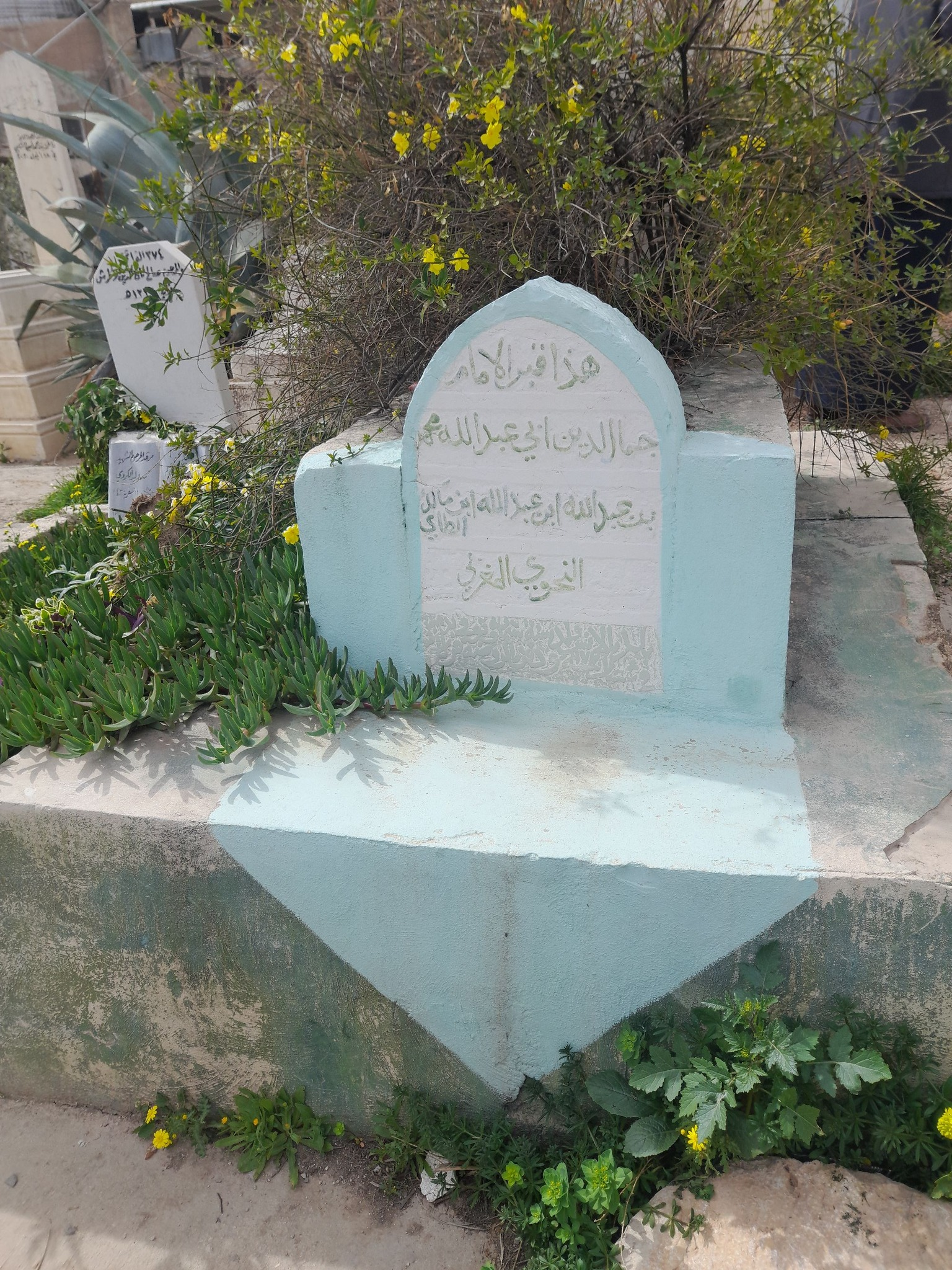
- Title: Titles: Jamāl al-Dīn; Abū ʿAbd Allāh

Personal life
- Born: 1203 CE (600 AH) Jaén, Al-Andalus
- Died: 21 February 1274 (aged 70–71) / 12 Shaʿbān 672 AH Damascus, Mamluk Syria
- Resting place: al-Rawḍa, Damascus (near the grave of Ibn Qudāma)
- Parent: ʿAbd Allāh ibn Muḥammad (father)
- Main interests: Arabic grammar; Linguistics; Qurʾānic recitation; Hadith
- Notable works: Alfiyya of Ibn Malik; al-Kāfiya al-shāfiya; Tashīl al-fawāʾid wa-takmīl al-maqāṣid; Shawāhid al-tawḍīḥ; Lāmiyyat al-afʿāl
- Occupation: Grammarian; Philologist; Linguist; Teacher

Religious life
- Religion: Islam
- Denomination: Sunni
- Jurisprudence: Shafi‘i

Muslim leader
- Influenced by: Abū ʿAlī al-Shalubīn; Ibn al-Hajib; Ibn Yaʿīsh
- Influenced: Badr al-Din Ibn Malik; Ibn Jamāʿa; Abū al-Ḥasan al-Yūnīnī; Ibn al-Nahhas; Abū al-Thanaʾ al-Ḥalabī
- Arabic name
- Personal (Ism): Muḥammad مُحَمَّد
- Patronymic (Nasab): Ibn ʿAbd Allāh ibn Muḥammad ibn ʿAbd Allāh ibn Mālik al-Ṭāʾī al-Jayyānī ٱبْن عَبْد ٱللَّه ٱبْن مُحَمَّد ٱبْن عَبْد ٱللَّه ٱبْن مَالِك ٱلطَّائِيّ ٱلْجَيَّانِيّ
- Teknonymic (Kunya): Abū ʿAbd Allāh أَبُو عَبْد ٱللَّه
- Toponymic (Nisba): al-Ṭāʾī al-Jayyānī ٱلطَّائِيّ ٱلْجَيَّانِيّ

Jamāl al-Dīn Abū ʿAbd Allāh Muḥammad ibn ʿAbd Allāh ibn Muḥammad ibn ʿAbd Allāh ibn Mālik al-Ṭāʾī al-Jayyānī (600–672 AH / 1203–1274 CE), widely known as Ibn Mālik, was an Andalusian grammarian, philologist, and linguist. He is best remembered for his didactic poem the Alfiyya of Ibn Malik, which became one of the most studied works in the Arabic grammatical tradition.

== Early life ==
Ibn Mālik was born in Jaén, Spain (al-Andalus) in 600 AH/1203 CE, during a period of political instability as Christian forces advanced in the Iberian Peninsula. He studied grammar, linguistics, and Qurʾānic recitation with scholars in al-Andalus, including Abū ʿAlī al-Shalubīn, Thābit ibn Khiyār, and Aḥmad ibn Nuwār.

== Migration to the East ==
After the siege of Jaén in 627 AH (1230 CE), Ibn Mālik migrated east. He first settled in Aleppo, where he studied with Ibn al-Hajib and Ibn Yaʿīsh, and gained recognition as a master of Arabic grammar and Qurʾānic readings. He later taught in Hama, where he composed his Alfiyya, before moving to Cairo and then Damascus.

In Damascus he was appointed to teach at the al-ʿĀdiliyya Madrasa and later became its head. He also held a teaching circle in the Umayyad Mosque, where he remained active in scholarship until his death in 1274 CE.

== Students ==
Among his most prominent students were his son Badr al-Din Ibn Malik, who wrote a commentary on the Alfiyya; the jurist Badr al-Dīn Ibn Jamāʿa; the hadith scholar Abū al-Ḥasan al-Yūnīnī; the grammarian Ibn al-Nahhas; and Abū al-Thanaʾ al-Ḥalabī, a chancery secretary in Egypt and Damascus.

== Works ==
Ibn Mālik was a prolific author whose writings cover grammar, morphology, philology, Qurʾānic recitation, and hadith studies. His most important works include:

- Alfiyya of Ibn Mālik – a versified grammar of about 1,000 lines in rajaz metre, summarizing rules of Arabic syntax and morphology.
- al-Kāfiya al-shāfiya – a 3,000-verse didactic poem on grammar.
- Tashīl al-fawāʾid wa-takmīl al-maqāṣid – a concise prose grammar widely studied and commented upon.
- Lāmiyyat al-afʿāl – on verb morphology.
- Iʿjāz al-taṣrīf and Tuḥfat al-mawdūd fī al-maqṣūr wa-l-mamdūd.
- Shawāhid al-tawḍīḥ li-mushkilāt al-jāmiʿ al-ṣaḥīḥ – grammatical notes on hadith from Sahih al-Bukhari.

=== Commentaries on the Alfiyya ===
The Alfiyya was the subject of over forty commentaries and glosses, including:

- Awḍaḥ al-masālik by Ibn Hishām al-Anṣārī (d. 1359).
- Sharḥ Ibn ʿAqīl by Bahāʾ al-Dīn Ibn ʿAqīl (d. 1367).
- Sharḥ al-Ashmūnī by Abū al-Ḥasan al-Ashmūnī (d. 1522).
- al-Bahja al-marḍiyya by Jalāl al-Dīn al-Suyūṭī (d. 1505).

== Character and scholarship ==
Contemporaries described Ibn Mālik as dignified, modest, and devoted to study and teaching. He was renowned for his mastery of Arabic poetry used in linguistic evidence, his command of Qurʾānic readings, and his careful method of writing—never recording from memory without checking sources.

== Death ==
Ibn Mālik died in Damascus on Monday 21 February 1274 (12 Shaʿbān 672 AH). He was buried at al-Rawḍa near the grave of Ibn Qudāma.

== See also ==
- Arabic grammar
- Andalusian scholars
- Alfiyya of Ibn Mālik

== Sources ==
- al-Maqarrī, Nafḥ al-ṭīb, ed. Iḥsān ʿAbbās, Beirut 1968.
- Ibn Shākir al-Kutubī, Fawāt al-wafayāt, ed. Iḥsān ʿAbbās, Beirut 1974.
- al-Subkī, Ṭabaqāt al-Shāfiʿiyya al-kubrā, ed. ʿAbd al-Fattāḥ al-Ḥulw and Maḥmūd al-Ṭanāḥī, Cairo 1992.
- ʿAbd al-ʿĀl Sālim Makram, al-Madrasah al-naḥwiyya fī Miṣr fī al-qarnayn al-sābiʿ wa-l-thāmin, Beirut 1990.
- Muḥammad Kāmel Barakāt, Introduction to Tashīl al-fawāʾid, Cairo 1967.
