= Al-Mu'allimi =

Yemeni Islamic scholar (1894–1966)

al-Mu'allimi al-Yamani
- المعلمي اليماني
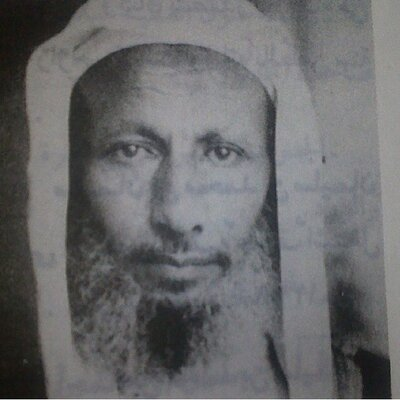

Personal life
- Born: 1894 Al-Mahaqirah, Yemen
- Died: 1966 (aged 71–72)
- Children: Abd Allah
- Occupation: Librarian, Teacher, Author and Manuscript Copyeditor

Religious life
- Religion: Islam
- Denomination: Sunni
- Jurisprudence: Shafi'i
- Creed: Athari

Muslim leader
- Influenced by: Malik ibn Anas; Al-Shafi'i; Ahmad ibn Hanbal; al-Barbahari; Ibn Hazm; Ibn Qudama; Ibn Taymiyya; al-Dhahabi; Ibn Qayyim al-Jawziyya; Ibn Kathir; Ibn Muflih; Ibn Rajab; Muhammad ibn Abd al-Wahhab
- Influenced: Salafism

Abd al-Rahman ibn Yahya ibn Ali (Arabic: عبد الرحمن بن يحيى بن علي, romanized: ʿAbd al-Raḥmān ibn Yaḥyā ibn ʿAlī; 1894–1966), commonly known by the nisba al-Mu'allimi al-Yamani (Arabic: المعلمي اليماني, romanized: al-Muʿallimī al-Yamanī), was a Yemeni Islamic scholar. He played a significant role within Salafism, aligning with the teachings of Ibn Taymiyya, Muhammad ibn Abd al-Wahhab, and Athari theology.

Recognized for his substantial contributions to Islamic academia, he left a lasting impact in both teaching and scholarly tradition. Al-Mu'allimi's edited more than 170 volumes of Islamic literature, covering a diverse array of subjects. He taught in Mecca, particularly at the Grand Mosque.

== Early life ==
Al-Mu'allimi was born in 1894 in the village of Al-Mahaqirah, located approximately 15 km from Sanaa, Yemen. He studied the Quran at an early age under the guidance of his father and a local village teacher. His educational pursuits led him to Al-Hujariah, where his elder brother, Muhammad, held a clerical position in an Islamic court. In this setting, Al-Mu'allimi enrolled in a comprehensive educational institution offering courses in Quranic studies, tajweed, arithmetic, and the Turkish language.

Al-Mu'allimi's father, during a visit, noted his son's deficiency in Arabic grammar. Subsequently, the father asked Muhammad, the older brother, to instruct his brother in Arabic grammar. Al-Mu'allimi started learning from the 13th-century Arabic grammar text Al-Ajurrumiyya. This event was the start of Al-Mu'allimi's enthusiasm for the study of Arabic grammar. Upon moving to the village of Bilad Al-Reemi (the land of Reemi), he befriended Ahmad bin Muslih Al-Remi, with whom he used to revise Arabic grammar through the analysis of Quranic verses and Arabic poetry.

Al-Mu'allimi's pursuit of knowledge reached new heights when he traveled with his father to Al-Tifin, where he received tutoring from the scholar Ahmad bin Muhammad bin Sulaiman al-Mu'allimi over an extended period.

In 1917, at the age of 23, Al-Mu'allimi assumed the role of a court clerk in the Otmah District of Yemen.

== Family ==
Al-Mu'allimi was born into a family of seven siblings. He got married once, from an Indian woman during his stay in Hyderabad, India. He had one child, Abdullah.

His father, Yahya ibn Ali al-Mu'allimi, a jurist married to two wives, established residence in Bilad al-Reemi. Upon his arrival, he encountered dilapidated structures atop a mountain and, obtaining permission from the landowner, constructed a residence and mosque. This mountain was where Al-Mu'allimi and his family lived until the death of the father in 1942.

Some of his siblings:

- Muhammad al-Mu'allimi: He was a student of knowledge, served as a clerk and knew Turkish fluently. He died early and left behind a huge library which his father later incorporated into the family residence.
- Ahmad al-Mu'allimi: He migrated to Indonesia, engaging in trade, and returned to Yemen in the 1950s for settlement.
- Abd al-Majid al-Mu'allimi: He was a learned masn who memorized the Quran and was in the company of his father until his father died. Then, he relocated to Sanaa, living with one of his children until his demise in 1994.
- Saidah al-Mu'allimi: She was an illiterate but impactful figure, was the mother of the esteemed scholar Abd al-Rahman ibn Abd al-Qadir al-Mu'allimi. Despite her lack of formal education, she played a significant role in shaping her children's lives and education. She died in 1973.

== Leaving Yemen ==
During Yahya Muhammad Hamid ed-Din's rule, a notable number of individuals from the al-Mu'allimi family experienced persecution and imprisonment in Yemen. Allegations of loyalty to external entities led to harsh treatment against Al-Mu'allimi's family. In 1918, al-Mu'allimi left Yemen for a pilgrimage to Mecca and Madinah, subsequently settling in Jazan upon his return.

In Jazan, under the governance of Muhammad ibn Ali al-Idrisi, al-Mu'allimi assumed the role of supreme judge and acquired the title Shaykh al-Islam. Al-Mu'allimi remained in this position until the death of al-Idrisi in 1923, after which he, along with other high-status individuals, was expelled by the new ruler. Following his expulsion, al-Mu'allimi sought refuge in Aden, dedicating himself to the teaching of Islamic sciences.

=== Indonesia ===
In 1925, he briefly traveled to Indonesia, contributing to educational endeavors during his stay.

=== India ===
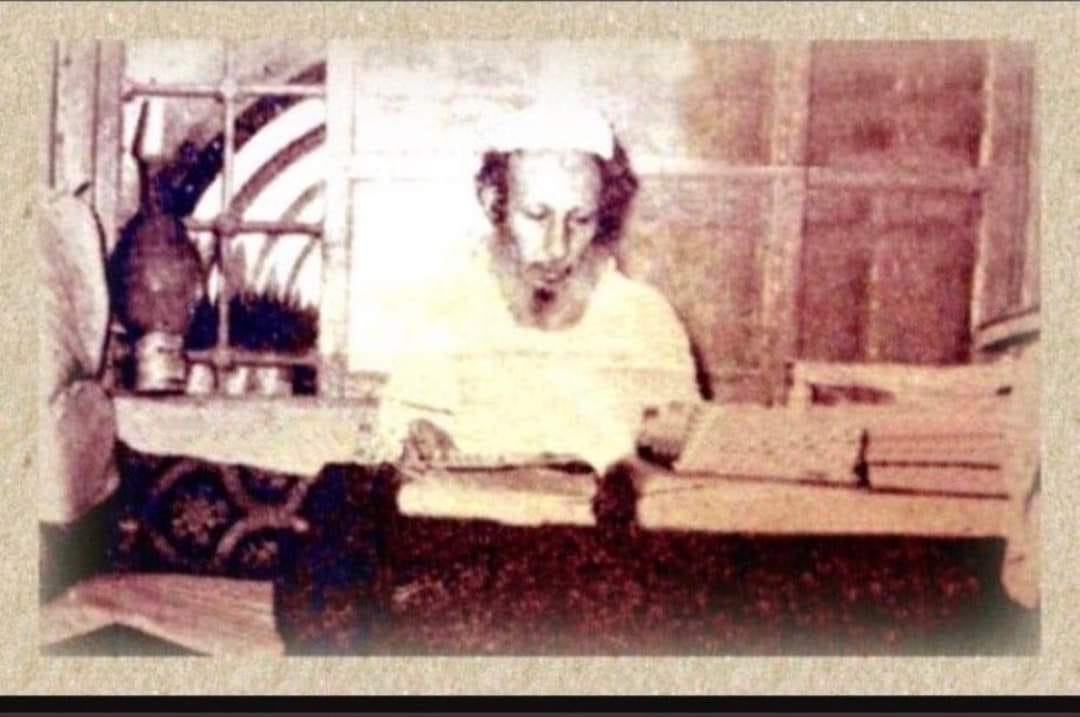
Al-Mu'allimi working with manuscripts

The subsequent year saw Al-Mu'allimi relocating to India, where he became a member of the Ottoman Committee of Knowledge in Hyderabad. Specializing in manuscript editing and revision, he devoted 25 years to this role, significantly enriching the Islamic library. His efforts contributed to the publication of over 40 volumes of manuscripts.

=== Saudi Arabia ===
In 1952, Al-Mu'allimi moved to Jeddah, assuming a teaching position in a local school there. Shortly thereafter, he relocated to Mecca and took on the role of librarian at the Grand Mosque's library. Concurrently, he provided instruction on subjects such as Arabic grammar, rhetoric, and jurisprudence at the Grand Mosque of Mecca.

== Creed ==
Al-Mu'allimi was an adherent of the Athari creed, a doctrinal framework characterized by its continuity with the beliefs upheld by the first three generations of Islam subsequent to the era of Muhammad. This creed is based on textual evidence derived from the Quran and the Sunnah. Al-Mu'allimi emphasized the importance of grounding theological and jurisprudential matters in the foundations drawn from the divine revelation (Quran and Sunnah) and the interpretations of the early Islamic generations. He strongly opposed the incorporation of innovative rules that lacked grounding in the original sources, advocating instead for a return to the authentic teachings of Muhammad and his immediate successors.

Al-Mu'allimi's disapproval of philosophy and Kalam (theological discourse) came from his belief that these represented innovations not inherent in the Quran, the Sunnah, or the initial three generations of Islam. His opposition was particularly evident in matters pertaining to God's attributes and the unseen world. This doctrinal stance found expression in his influential works, such as "Building up the Graves" (Arabic: عمارة القبور), and the book of worship, wherein he emphasized the superiority of revelation over ideas not firmly rooted in divine guidance.

== Works ==
=== Literary works ===
==== The Exemplary Punishment in the Reproach of al-Kawthari from His Vanities ====
This work by Al-Mu'allimi was his most celebrated contributions. Al-Mu'allimi engaged in intra-Islamic debates. This work serves as a comprehensive response to al-Kawthari's book, "The Reproach of Al-Khateeb: Exposing Fabrications and Deceptions in Abu Hanifa's Autobiography" (Arabic: تأنيب الخطيب على ما ساقه في ترجمة أبي حنيفة من الأكاذيب). Al-Mu'allimi divided this book into an introduction and four distinct sections.

In the introductory portion, he described the primary objective of his work. The goal of this work is to oppose the accusations put forth by al-Kawthari, as they are, under al-Mu'allimi's Athari view, a threat to the foundations of the religion.

The first section of his response delves into the fundamental principles of the Sunni Athari school, describing their approach to the field of hadith and the criteria for validating or rectifying narrators.

In the second section, Al-Mu'allimi compiles autobiographical information on more than 270 narrators of hadith. This is because a large part of the debate between al-Mu'allimi and al-Kawthari are academic discussions about specific narrators in the field of Hadith.

In the third section, al-Mu'allimi critically examines 17 jurisprudential matters where he opposes Al-Kawthari's views.

The final section, "The Guide in the Correction of Creeds," addresses debates between the Athari school and the Ash'ari and Maturidi schools, opposing al-Kawthari's stances on matters of creed, supporting the primacy of textual evidence over theological discourse (kalam) and philosophy.

=== Copy editing works ===
==== The Great History by Al-Bukhari ====
Authored by the renowned 9th-century scholar al-Bukhari, this book holds a pivotal place in the field of biographical evaluations within the Islamic science of narrations and hadith.

==== The Invalidation And Rectification by Ibn Abi Hatim ====
Authored by the 8th-century scholar Ibn Abi Hatim, this work is considered one of the most significant and oldest contributions to the field of biographical evaluations in the Islamic science of narrations and hadith.

==== The Major Sunan by Al-Bayhaqi ====
A substantial compilation of Hadiths, this work is attributed to al-Bayhaqi, a prominent scholar from the 11th century.

== Reception ==
Al-Mu'allimi gained widespread acclaim within the Salafi school. Sheikh Muhammad ibn Ibrahim Al ash-Sheikh, the Grand Mufti of Saudi Arabia from 1953 to 1969, incorporated one of al-Mu'allimi's books as a textbook in his instructional sessions. Al ash-Sheikh said al-Mu'allimi was a distinguished scholar who made significant contributions, particularly in the field of prophetic Hadiths.

Albanian Islamic scholar al-Albani contributed a foreword to al-Mu'allimi's book. Al-Mu'allimi's comments against al-Kawthari's perspectives on creed, jurisprudence, and statements regarding the companions and early generations in Islam were praised from al-Albani.

Sheikh Abu Ishaq Al-Heweny stated that the only thing he regrets in his life is not getting the chance to meet Al-Mu'allimi in person.

== Death ==
Al-Mu'allimi died at the age of 73 on Thursday, May 26, 1966, after the Fajr prayer, and was buried in Mecca.
