= Hammad al-Ansari =

Muslim scholar (1925–1997)

- حماد الأنصاري

Personal life
- Born: 1925 Mali
- Died: October 22, 1997 (aged 71–72) Madinah, Saudi Arabia
- Occupation: Teacher

Religious life
- Religion: Islam
- Denomination: Sunni
- Jurisprudence: Maliki
- Creed: Athari
- Movement: Wahhabism

Muslim leader
- Influenced by: Malik ibn Anas; Al-Shafi'i; Ahmad ibn Hanbal; al-Barbahari; Ibn Hazm; Ibn Qudama; Ibn Taymiyya; al-Dhahabi; Ibn Qayyim al-Jawziyya; Ibn Kathir; Ibn Muflih; Ibn Rajab; Muhammad ibn Abd al-Wahhab; Abdur-Rahman al-Mu'allimee al-Yamani
- Influenced: Ahl-i Hadith movement; Salafi movement

Hammad bin Muhammad al-Ansari al-Khazarji al-Sa'di (Arabic: حماد بن محمد الأنصاري الخزرجي السعدي, romanized: Ḥammād bin Muḥammad al-Anṣārī al-Khazrajī al-Saʻdī; 1925–1997) was a Muslim scholar of the 20th century who served as a faculty member at the Islamic University in Madinah. Al-Ansari specialized in the Islamic science of hadith, but his academic contributions spanned all Islamic sciences, and he was influential over many current prominent scholars and Islamic figures.

== Early life ==
=== Lineage ===
Al-Ansari's lineage traces back to the companion of Muhammad, Saʽd ibn ʽUbadah, who was a leader in the tribe of Al-Khazrag. Thus, his full name is Hamad bin Muhammad Al-Ansari Al-Khazragi Al-Saʽdi.

=== Family ===
Al-Ansari grew up in Mali, West Africa, in a scholarly family where his paternal and maternal uncles were scholars and judges. His father died when he was young, which led him to be raised by his mother and uncles. One of his paternal uncles, nicknamed Al-Bahr (Arabic for the Sea), was renowned for his vast knowledge and was esteemed as the leading scholar in the entirety of West Africa.

== Education ==
=== Early Studies ===
At the age of 8, Al-Ansari memorized the Quran. He pursued traditional Islamic studies, delving into Arabic grammar and rhetoric, Hadith studies, and fiqh (Islamic jurisprudence), where he memorized the Maliki jurisprudence text Mukhtasar of Khalil.

=== Escaping Persecution ===
At 21, Al-Ansari, along with some friends, decided to leave Mali, then under English and French occupation, due to persecution faced by scholars and students of Islamic studies. Their destination was Mecca. They embarked on their journey by camel, traveling through countries like Niger, Nigeria, and Sudan, encountering scholars and students of knowledge along the way.

=== In Saudi Arabia ===
Al-Ansari arrived in Mecca at 23, where he encountered scholar Hamid Faqi, who taught him Islamic creed and Hadith sciences and introduced him to the works of Ibn Taymiyyah, Ibn al-Qayyim, the Wahhabi School, and Muhammad bin Abdulwahab. He also studied under Abdur-Rahman al-Mu'allimee al-Yamani and Taqi-ud-Din al-Hilali. In 1953, he moved to Riyadh, working as a teacher supervised by Muhammad ibn Ibrahim Al ash-Sheikh. After 11 years, he relocated to Madinah to teach at the Islamic University until his death.

Al-Ansari established a small library near the Holy Mosque in Madinah, where students conducting graduate studies at the Islamic University sought his guidance on research, general inquiries, and feedback on their work. His library housed numerous manuscripts, primarily focusing on Athari creed or Hadith sciences.

== Reception ==
Al-Ansari was a respected scholar, attracting students worldwide to seek accreditation from him. Eminent scholars and government officials would consult him on creedal, jurisprudential, and societal matters. Some of the scholars who used to consult him include: Ibn Baz, Abu Bakr al-Jaza'iri, Saleh al-Luhaydan and Bakr Abu Zayd.

== Death ==
Al-Ansari died at the age of 74 on Wednesday, October 22, 1997, after falling into a nine-month coma due to a medical error. He was buried in Madinah, near the burial site of Muhammad's daughters.
