= Al-Khiraqi =

Hanbali legal jurist (911–945)

al-Khiraqī

Personal life
- Born: c. 299 AH / 911 CE Baghdad, Abbasid Caliphate
- Died: 334 AH / 945 CE Damascus, Ikhshidid State
- Era: Islamic golden age
- Main interest: Fiqh
- Notable work: Mukhtasar al-Khiraqi

Religious life
- Religion: Islam
- Denomination: Sunni
- Jurisprudence: Hanbali
- Creed: Athari

Muslim leader
- Teacher: Abu Bakr al-Marrudhi, Harb al-Kirmani, Salih ibn Ahmad ibn Hanbal, Abdullah ibn Ahmad ibn Hanbal
- Students: Ibn Battah, Abu al-Hasan al-Tamimi, Ibn Samʿūn, Abū Bakr al-Muqriʾ

Abū al-Qāsim ʿUmar ibn al-Ḥusayn al-Khiraqī al-Baghdadi (Note: Arabic: أبو القاسم عمر بن الحسين الخرقي البغدادي) (c. 911 – 945/46) was a prominent Sunni jurist of Hanbali school.

He is best known for his work Mukhtasar al-Khiraqi (al-Mukhtasar fi al-Fiqh), the only surviving text attributed to him. This was the first legal compendium composed for the Hanbali school of law, and it was later subject of comprehensive commentary titled Al-Mughnī, authored by Hanbali scholar Ibn Qudama. The Mukhtasar was widely accepted by his contemporaries among the Hanbalis and by the generation after that.
