= Ghulam al-Khallal =

Islamic scholar and Hanbali jurist

Ghulām al-Khallāl
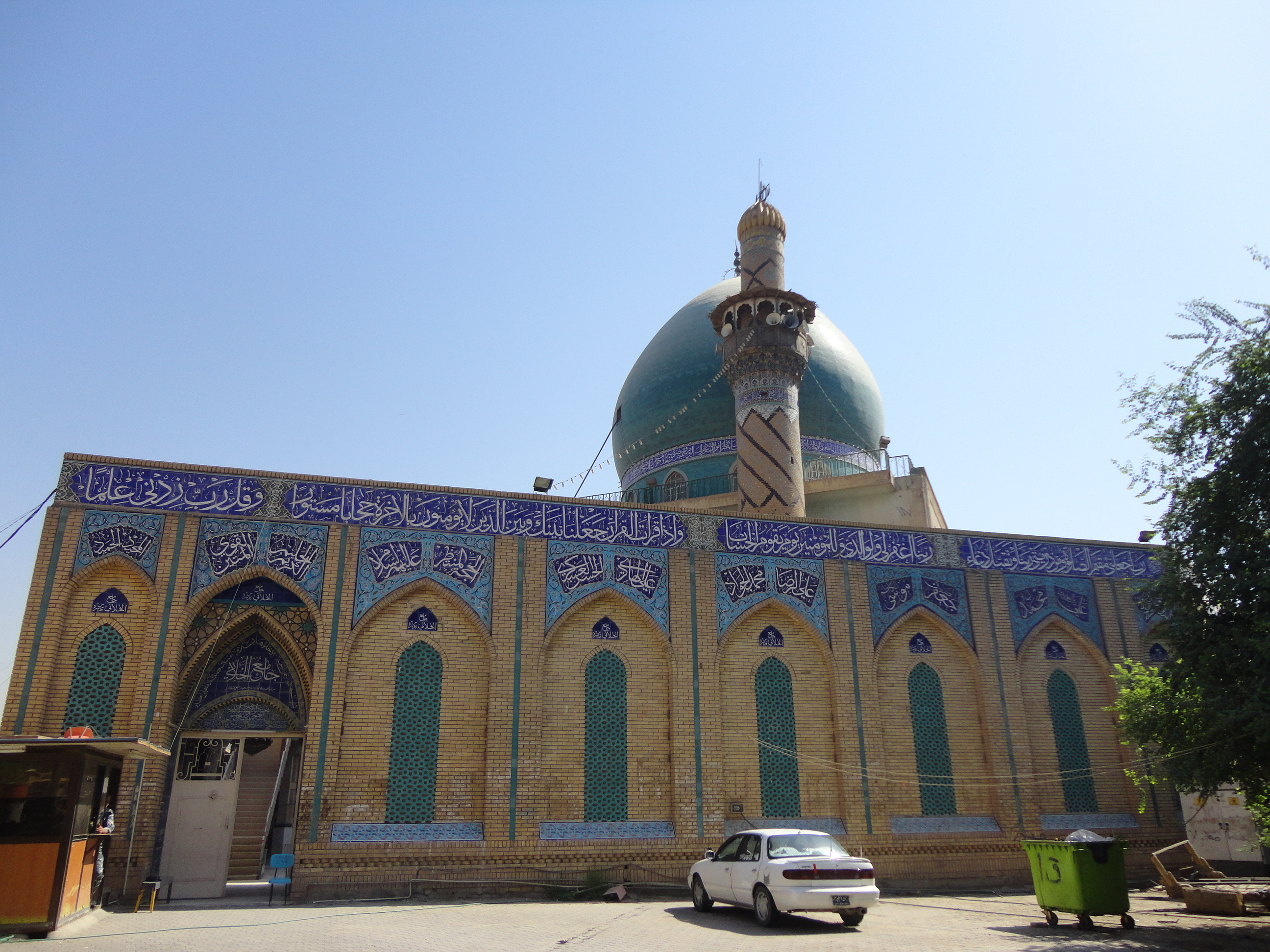
- The Al-Khilani Mosque, which contains the tomb of Ghulam al-Khallal.

Personal life
- Born: Abū Bakr ‘Abd al-‘Azīz ibn Ja‘far ibn Aḥmad ibn Yazdād al-Baghawī; 898 Baghdad; Abbasid Caliphate
- Died: 973 (aged 74–75) Baghdad; Abbasid Caliphate
- Buried: Al-Khilani Mosque
- Main interest: Islamic jurisprudence
- Notable works: Zād al-Musāfir fī Fiqh al-Imām Aḥmad; Masā’il ‘Abd al-‘Azīz Ghulām al-Khallāl

Religious life
- Religion: Islam
- Denomination: Sunni
- Jurisprudence: Ḥanbalī
- Creed: Textualist (Proto-Atharī)

Muslim leader
- Influenced by: Abu Bakr al-Khallal
- Influenced: Later Hanbali scholars

Ghulām al-Khallāl (898–973) was an Islamic scholar and jurist of the Hanbali school. His real name was ‘Abd al-‘Azīz. Al-Khallal was a close companion and assistant of the Hanbali jurist Abu Bakr al-Khallal, hence his nickname Ghulam (Arabic for "assistant"). He was one of the earliest scholars of the Hanbali school.

== Biography ==
‘Abd al-‘Azīz ibn Ja‘far al-Baghawī was born in 898 in Baghdad, with his epithet al-Baghawī indicating that he was of Khorasanite descent. In his youth, his teachers were Abu Ja'far al-Kufi, Musa ibn Harun al-Bazzah, and Abu al-Qasim al-Baghawi. After receiving his ijazah allowing him to be authorized as a proper scholar, he began to associate with the Hanbali jurist Abu Bakr al-Khallal and became one of his closest companions as well as a secretary and assistant for him, hence receiving the name Ghulām al-Khallāl ("Assistant of al-Khallal") which was also used as his pen name. Al-Khallal was also a jurist and transmitter of Hadith within the Hanbali school, narrating and explaining rulings from the school's founder Ahmad ibn Hanbal, while he also commented on the works of the Shafi'i school, which was widespread at the time. He was also a proponent of an early form of Atharism, much like earlier Hanbalis, whom were not familiar with the doctrine of tafwid and metaphorical interpretation.

Ghulam al-Khallal died in 973 and was buried in a cemetery in Baghdad, where the Al-Khilani Square is now located in the present day.

== Works ==
1. Zād al-Musāfir fī Fiqh al-Imām Aḥmad (Provisions of the Traveler in the Jurisprudence of Imam Ahmad), a book compiling the rulings and advices of Ahmad ibn Hanbal which Al-Khallal considers to be beneficial for readers.
2. Masā’il ‘Abd al-‘Azīz Ghulām al-Khallāl (The Legal Rulings of 'Abd al-'Aziz Ghulām al-Khallal), a treatise on the rulings of the Hanbali school according to Al-Khallal. Ibn Abi Ya'la, a later Hanbali scholar, commented on the treatise and wrote an appendix to it explaining the differences of the rulings of Al-Khallal and Ahmad ibn Hanbal, which was modernized and published in 1960 in Damascus.

== Legacy ==
During the Ottoman period, a mosque was built atop the grave of Ghulam al-Khallal, known as the Imam al-Khallal Mosque. The name "al-Khallal" was distorted to "al-Khallani" over time, with the tomb in the mosque being attributed to Abū Jaʿfar Muḥammad ibn ʿUthmān al-Khallānī, the second of the Four Deputies in the Twelver tradition of the Shi'a sect. Now known in the present day as the Al-Khilani Mosque, it is visited by both Shi'a and Sunni residents of Baghdad, who hold congregational prayers in the mosque as part of a move against sectarianism.

== See also ==
- Abu Bakr al-Khallal
- List of Hanbalis
- List of Atharis
