= Al-Khilani Square =

Square located in Baghdad, Iraq

- City Square
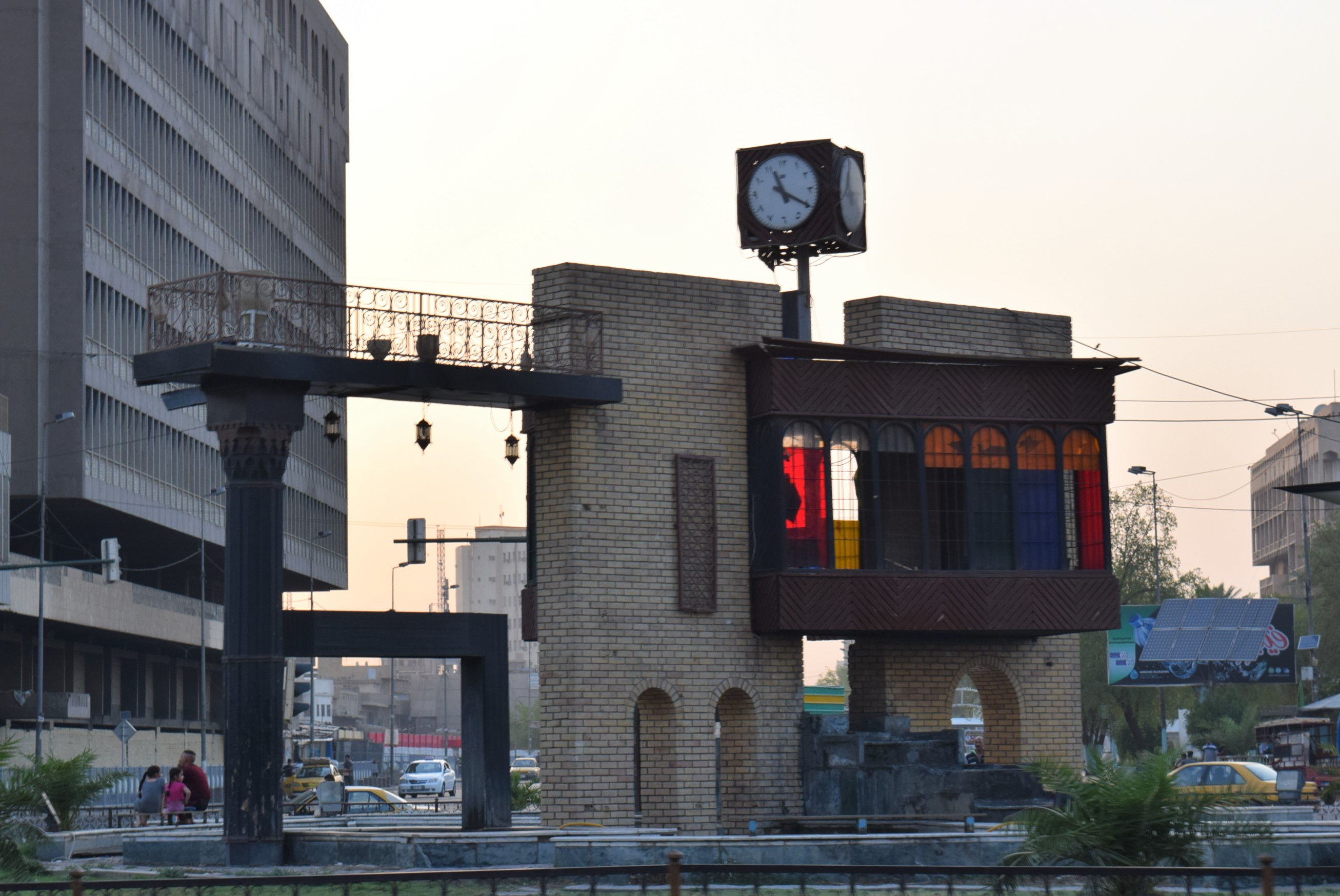
- A historic monument located in the center of the square
- Location: Al-Jumhuriya Street; Baghdad, Iraq
- Interactive map of Al-Khilani Square
- Coordinates: 33.3326°N 44.4052°E

Al-Khilani Square (Arabic: ساحة الخلاني) is a roundabout located in al-Rusafa side of Baghdad, Iraq. The square is home to many markets and departments as well as al-Khilani Mosque where the square got its name. In addition, the square is located in the center of various important streets that lead to important centers such as al-Jumhuriya Street which leads to the Shorja area, the street that leads to al-Sinak Bridge, and al-Tahrir Square which is 500 meters away. In recent years, the square saw many demonstrations taking place in it.

== Historical background ==
The oldest building in the square is al-Khilani Mosque. Despite the fact that the date of the mosque's construction is unknown, the oldest record of the mosque is in the year 1726, by Mustafa bin Kamal al-Din al-Sadiq al-Dimashqi in his travel diary to Baghdad. Al-Khilani Mosque is considered a shared heritage between both Sunni Muslims and Shi'a Muslims. Sunni Muslims attribute the mosque to be the burying ground of Ghulam al-Khallal, a famous Islamic jurist of the Hanbali school of thought. Shi'i Muslims attribute and claim that the entombed is Abu Ja'far Muhammad ibn Uthman, the second of the Four Deputies of the 12th Imam. Hence, the tomb has been taken great care of by Shi'i Muslims since the Kingdom of Iraq period and is regarded as a very important place for them. The square is also located near the ancient Mausoleum of Abdul-Qadir al-Gilani.

The headquarters for the Baghdad Municipality, which manages the public services of the city, is located in al-Khilani Square. Iraqi sculptor and artist Mohammed Ghani Hikmat had once planned for a bronze sculptor of Aladdin's oil lamp from the One Thousand and One Nights as a vision he had in which monuments throughout Iraq would tell the country's history. However, this project never progressed anywhere beyond planning due to Hikmat living abroad at the time.

== Present day ==
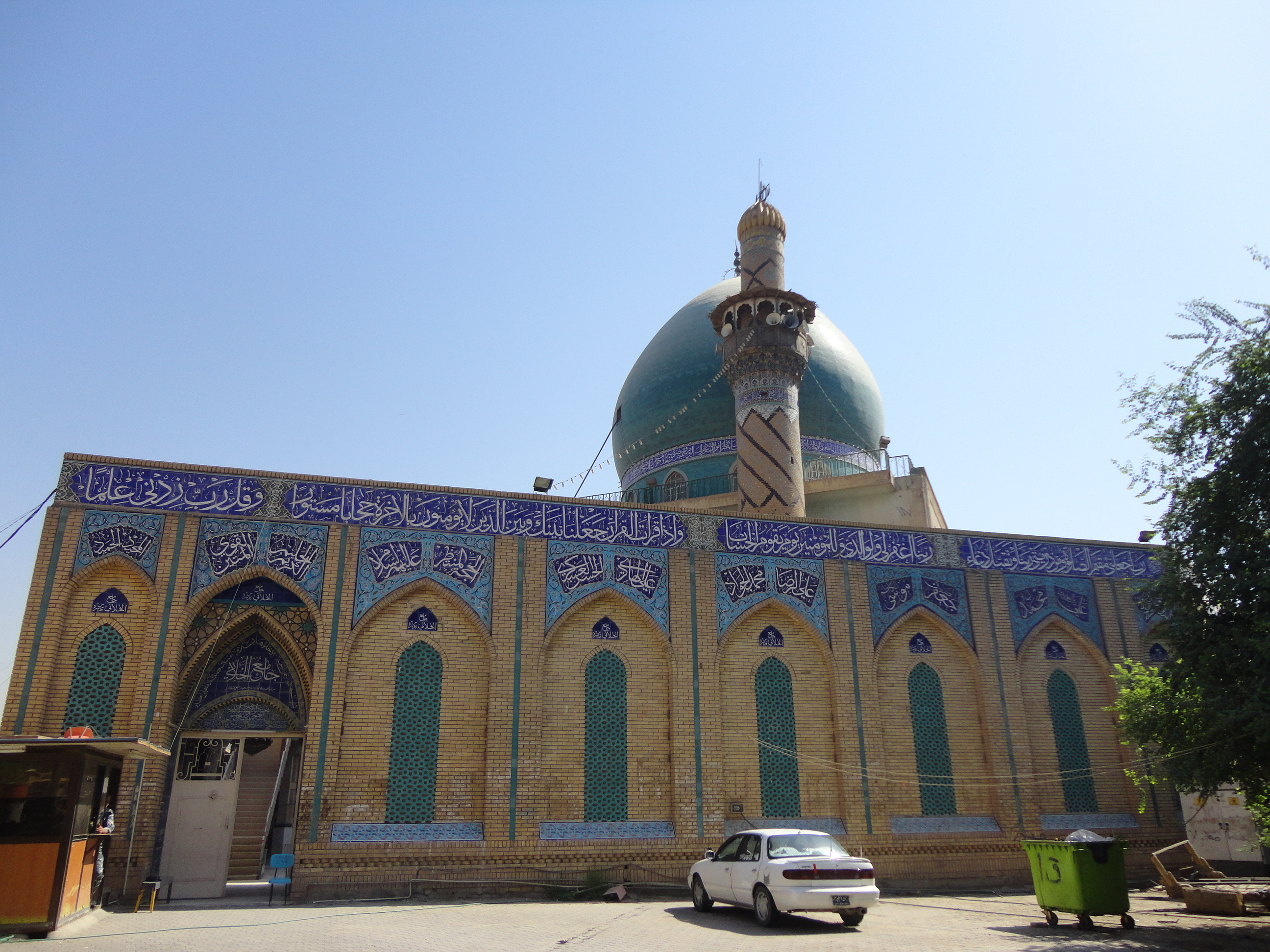
Al-Khilani Mosque is the most well-known building in the square that the square is named after.

During the Iraqi civil war, on 19 June 2007, a truck bomb exploded near al-Khilani Mosque, killing at least 78 people and injuring almost 200 others while they were leaving the mosque. The terrorist attack has been one of the deadliest up to that point and has been a part of a wave of recent attacks by sectarian groups. The walls surrounding the mosque were destroyed, and the cars around the square were set ablaze. Many civilians walking through the square carried the bodies and flesh of the victims away. Prime Minister at the time Nouri al-Maliki issued a statement and blamed the attack on "Saddamists" and "takfiris" who were trying to destroy the landmarks of Baghdad and its image.

During the 2019–2021 Iraqi protests, on 6 December 2019, the square was swept with anti-government demonstrations and protests after power was cut from the area. Unidentified gunmen in white pickup trucks wearing ski masks then arrived from the direction of the Abdul-Qadir al-Gilani Mausoleum and then opened fire on protesters, killing 25 (including three police officers) and injuring around 130 others. Buildings surrounding the square were pockmarked with bullet holes. Activists blamed the attack on Iran-backed militias. At the time of the shooting, one thousand protestors were present, and witnesses recounted that the protesters were gathered peacefully and not threatening any violent acts. Furthermore, the electricity in the square went out for about an hour until after the incident was done, and many eyewitnesses at the event reported strange behaviors from unknown figures who were present at the attack. Two doctors arrived at the square in Tuk-Tuks to treat the wounded protestors. Estimates would later put the death toll to be around 29 to 80 dead, and the death toll of the protests in general had reached 511 since the beginning of the protests three months earlier.

At around noon on 25 January 2020, security forces fired tear gas and live bullets at demonstrators in the square while riot police set fire to a number of protest tents on the nearby Al-Sinak Bridge, creating a large black smoke cloud. That same day, thousands of protestors retook the square.

Around 2022, the Baghdad Municipality rehabilitated the square. The redevelopment of the square included re-implementing fountains, planting green surfaces, constructing walkways around it, and installing a new structure for the canopies in the middle of the square, as well as installing lighting poles and an external fence, and implementing new decorative neon lighting. The goal of the project was to "restore life to the center of the capital" and was a part of a campaign to also rehabilitate nearby sites.

== See also ==
- Al-Tahrir Square
- Al-Firdos Square
- Al-Maidan Square
