= Al-Khilani Mosque =

Shi'ite mosque in Baghdad, Iraq

- جامع الخلاني
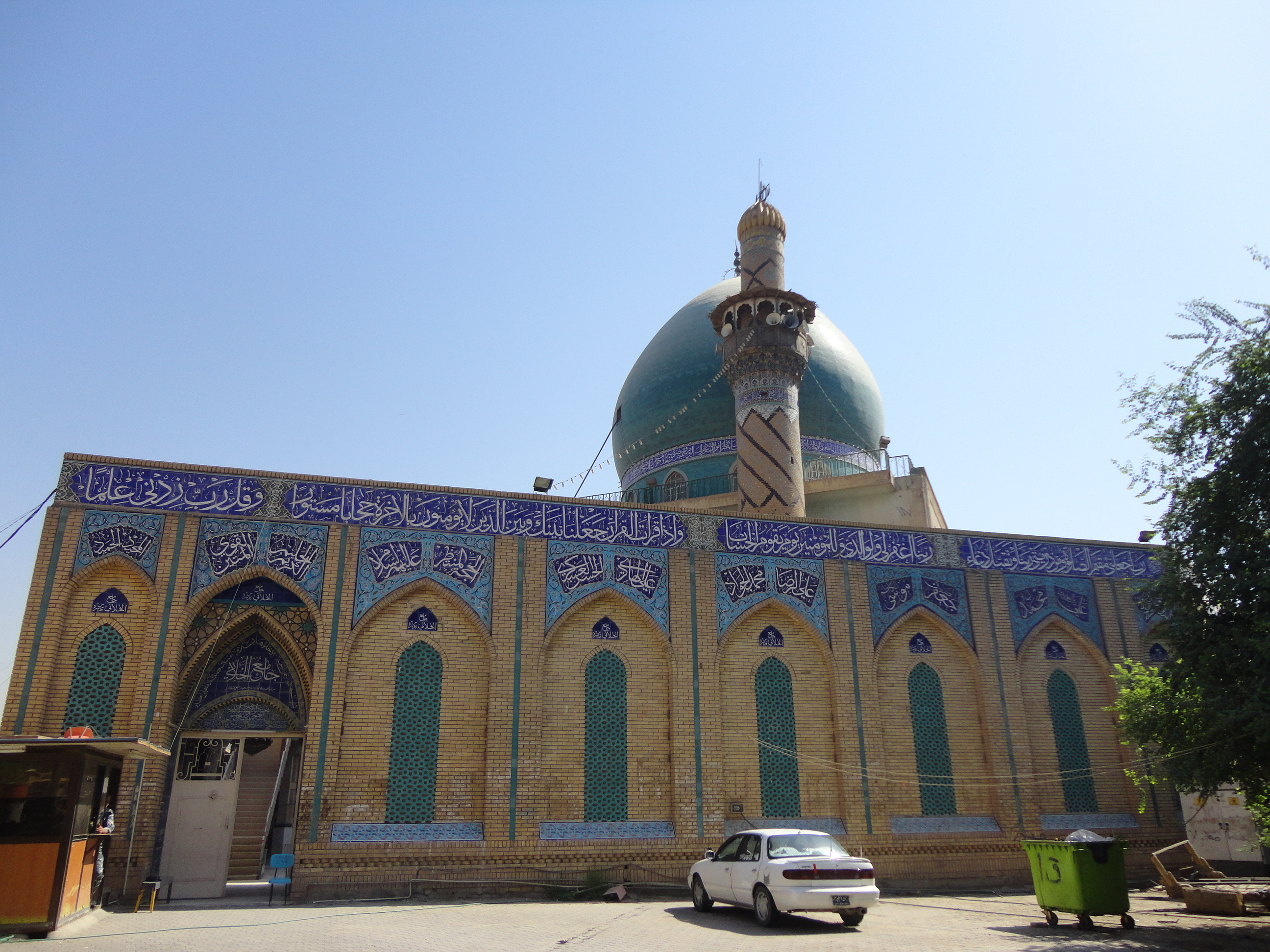

- Location of the mosque in Baghdad

Religion
- Affiliation: Shia Islam
- Ecclesiastical or organizational status: Mosque
- Status: Active

Location
- Location: Baghdad, Baghdad Governorate
- Country: Iraq
- Interactive map of Al-Khilani Mosque
- Coordinates: 33°20′01″N 44°24′19″E

Architecture
- Type: Mosque architecture
- Completed: c. 1726

Specifications
- Dome: One
- Minaret: One
- Shrine: One: disputed

The Al-Khilani Mosque (Arabic: جامع الخلاني) is a Shi'ite mosque located in Baghdad, in the Baghdad Governorate of Iraq. Heading from the direction of al-Jumhuriya Street, the mosque has an old shrine within it, with a tomb of controversial identification.

== History ==
=== Background and shrine ===
The mosque was once located in the Khilani Cemetery, that no longer exists. The exact date of the mosque's construction is unknown, however the earliest record of the mosque is in the year 1726, by Mustafa bin Kamal al-Din al-Sadiq al-Dimashqi in his travel diary to Baghdad.

The shrine is located in the corner of the mosque, where a grave is seen. The grave is covered by a metal zarih. It is disputed over who is buried within the shrine. The commonly agreed on belief is the Shi'ite claim that the entombed is Abu Ja'far Muhammad ibn Uthman, the second of the Four Deputies of the 12th Imam. Hence, the tomb has been taken great care of by Shi'ites and is regarded as a very important place for them, with the management of the mosque being held by the Shi'ites. However, the Sunnis claim that the buried person is the Hadith narrator Ghulam al-Khallal, whose real name is Abu Bakr Abdul Aziz ibn Ja'far, receiving his nickname from his association with the Hanbali jurist Abu Bakr al-Khallal.

Modern historian Imad Abd al-Salam Rauf believes that the mosque contains the grave of Ghulam al-Khallal, stating so in his book Landmarks of Baghdad in the Late Centuries. Historians Mustafa Jawad and Ahmad Soussa, in Detailed Guide to the Map of Baghdad Detailing the Plans of Baghdad, Past and Present, said that the grave is that of a Hanbali jurist.

=== Modern history ===
After World War I, condolence gatherings were held in which the preacher talked about the British occupation of Iraq, which led to the worshippers leaving the mosque in a mass march against the occupying forces at the time. The mosque is currently located in al-Khilani Square. The Square was named after the mosque due to overlooking it and al-Jumhuriya Street.

Al-Khilani Mosque was targeted by a suicide terrorist attack in 2007 which resulted in 78 deaths along with 218 injured in the blast. The attack happened after the bomber rammed a truck full of explosives into the mosque. According to its Imam, Saleh Muhammad al-Haidari, the explosion happened as worshippers were leaving the mosque. The explosion damaged the dome of the mosque and one of the walls of the library.

In 2013, the preacher of the mosque, Saleh al-Haidari, held a sermon in which both Sunni Muslims and Shia Muslims were invited in protest against the Sectarianism that the government was stirring up for its interests. He also accused foreign parties and nearby countries of working to stir up sedition in the country. Due to al-Haidari's activities, the mosque became a symbol of national unity in which many visit daily from both in and out of Iraq.

== Description ==
The mosque overlooks al-Jumhuriya Street. It has one large dome and a single minaret, with a large courtyard. The shrine is located in a corner of the mosque. A library is also present, where many valuable books can be found.

== See also ==
- Islam in Iraq
- List of mosques in Baghdad
