= Mar'i al-Karmi =

Palestinian Islamic Scholar

Shaykh al-Islām Mar'i al-Karmi
- مرعي الكرمي

Personal life
- Born: Mar'i Yusuf Abi Bakr al-Karmi مرعي يوسف أبي بكر الكرمي; 1580 Tulkarm
- Died: 1624 (aged 43–44) Cairo
- Resting place: Tulkarm, Jerusalem, Cairo
- Era: 16th century 17th century
- Region: Arab world
- Main interest(s): Fiqh, Tafsir, Aqeedah
- Notable work: Dalīl al-ṭālib li-nayl al-maṭālib (in Arabic Wikipedia)
- Education: Al-Azhar
- Occupation: Scholar of Islam

Religious life
- Religion: Islam
- Denomination: Sunni
- Jurisprudence: Hanbali
- Creed: Athari

Muslim leader
- Influenced by: Ahmad ibn Hanbal, Uthman ibn Sa'id al-Darimi, Ibn Taymiyya, Mansur al-Buhuti

Marʻī ibn Yūsuf ibn Abī Bakr Aḥmad al-Karmī (Arabic: مرعي بن يوسف بن أبي بكر بن أحمد الكرمي; 1580, Tulkarm – 1624, Cairo), often referred as Marʻī ibn Yūsuf al-Karmī, was a Muslim scholar and one of the most famous Hanbali scholars in the Arab world. He was born in Tulkarm, and died in Cairo. He authored several books and most of them are related to Islam.

== Life ==
Mar'i al-Karmi was born in Tulkarm in Palestine on April 1580 in the sixteenth century. There are differences among Muslim scholars about his year of birth. Karmi grew up in Tulkarm, and he completed his education from Tulkarm, then he studied Islamic sciences in Jerusalem.

After that, he went to Egypt and joined the Al-Azhar. There, he studied with Shaykh Manṣūr al-Buhūtī. Mar'i al-Karmi became one of the famous scholars of Al-Azhar, then he became the main Shaykh in the Mosque of Sultan Hassan.

== Works ==
His works has been collected in "Majmu' Rasail al-'Allamah Mar'i al-Karmi al-Hanbali".

He was the author of more than one hundred books in many subjects such as Fiqh, Aqeedah, Tafsir, history, poetry and Quranic studies. Some of them are:

- Bahjat al-Nazirin wa Ayat al-Mustadillin (The Delight of Onlookers and the Signs for Investigators), a treatise on cosmology and eschatology (the affairs of the Last Judgment and the Afterlife).
- Farāʾid Fawāʾid al-Fikr fī al-Imām al-Mahdī al-Muntaẓar (Unique Benefits of Contemplation on the Awaited Imam Mahdi)
- Dalīl al-ṭālib li-nayl al-maṭālib.
- Shifāʼ al-ṣudūr fī ziyārat Al-Mashāhid wal Qubūr
- Al-Kawākib ad-Duriya fī Manāqib Al-Mujtahid Ibn Taymiyyah
- Aqāwīl al-thiqāt fī tā'wīl al-asmā' wa-al-sifāt wa-al-ayāt al-muhkamāt wa-al-mutashabahāt.
- Taḥqīq al-burhān fī ithbāt ḥaqīqat al-mīzān.
- Lafẓ al-muwaṭṭaʼ fī bayān al-ṣalāh al-wusṭá.
- Dafʻ al-Shubhah.
- Qalāʼid al-marjān fī al-nāsikh wa-al-mansūkh min al-Qurʼān.

== Personal life ==
He was married and had two sons, Yahya and Ahmad.

== Death ==
Mar'i al-Karmi died in Cairo in 1624, and was buried there.
