= Al-Kaafi =

Hanbali Fiqh book by Ibn Qudamah

Al-Kaafi fi fiqh al-Imaam Ahmad bin Hanbal is a book of Hanbali Fiqh written by Imaam Ibn Qudamah.

== Description ==
Al-Kaafi is one of the marvels of Islamic literature. It is from the series of literal accomplishments offered by the author, al-Imaam Ibn Qudamah al-Maqdisi. It is the third book in a series of four books that Ibn Qudamah wrote in order to gradually take a student of knowledge through the different levels of understanding.

‘Umdah for the elementary level

al-Muqni’ for the middle-school level

al-Kaafi for the high-school level

al-Mughni for the university level

Al-Kaafi was authored with the goal of acquainting the student with the sources of the Law and the methodology for extrapolating rules from the revelation. It brings forth the differing opinion with their evidence and explains what is preferred.

Al-Kaafi is a blessed book that contains a huge amount of benefit for the reader even though it is only four volumes. This is the perfect level for the student of knowledge since it deals with evidence but it is not as detailed as al-Mughni. It is very self-explanatory and that might explain why it has not been explained by any scholar in a separate book form, unlike al-`Umdah or al-Muqni`.

== About the author ==
Ibn Qudamah (أبن قدامة) was a distinguished scholar of Islam. He was a major pillar of the Hanbali madhhab and the author of numerous famous books, He was born in Palestine in 541 Hijri, He memorized the entire Quran at an early age, then continued to memorize by heart huge manuscripts of Islamic knowledge.

Al-Haafidh Ibn Kathir said about him: "He was the Shaikh ul Islaam, an Imaam, a Scholar, outstandingly proficient. There was not found in his time or before it by a long span of time, anyone possessing more Fiqh than him."

Al-Haafidh Ibn Rajab al-Hanbali said about his books: "He generated benefit to all the Muslims on a general level, and to the scholars of the (Hanbali) Madhab on a specific level. These books spread widely and grew very popular, according to the nobility of his intention and sincerity when writing them."
