= Ibn Abd al-Hadi =

14th-century Islamic Scholar Muhaddith

Muhammad bin Abd al-Hadi

Personal life
- Born: 705 AH (1305/1306 CE) Damascus, Bahri Mamluk
- Died: 744 AH (1343/1344 CE)
- Era: Medieval era
- Region: Levant
- Main interest(s): Fiqh, Hadith, Nahw

Religious life
- Religion: Islam
- Denomination: Sunni
- Jurisprudence: Hanbali
- Creed: Athari

Muslim leader
- Influenced by: Ahmad ibn Hanbal, Uthman ibn Sa'id al-Darimi, Ibn Taymiyya, Al-Mizzi, Al-Dhahabi, Ibn al-Qayyim
- Influenced: Ibn al-Mibrad

Shams al-Din Abu Abd Allah Muhammad bin Ahmad bin Abd al-Hadi al-Maqdisi al-Hanbali (Arabic: محمد بن عبد الهادي المقدسي) better known as Ibn Abd al-Hadi (Damascus, 1305 (AH 705) - 1343 (AH 744)) was a 14th century Hanbali jurist and Muhaddith from the Levant. He was a student of Ibn Taymiyya. He is not to be confused with Yusuf ibn Abd al-Hadi (d. 909 AH (1503/1504 CE), who was also from the same family as Ibn Abd al-Hadi.
