= Ibn al-Mibrad =

Islamic scholar

Jamāl al-Dīn Yūsuf ibn ʻAbd al-Hādī al-Salihi

Personal life
- Born: 1436 Damascus, Syria
- Died: 1503 (aged 66–67) Damascus, Syria; Mamluk Sultanate
- Main interest: ʾUṣūl al-Fiqh (Islamic jurisprudence)
- Notable work: Ghāyat al-sūl ilā ʿilm al-uṣūl

Religious life
- Religion: Islam
- Denomination: Sunni
- Jurisprudence: Ḥanbalī
- Creed: Atharī

Muslim leader
- Influenced by: Ahmad ibn Hanbal, Ibn Qudama, Ibn Taymiyya, Ibn Abd al-Hadi, Ibn Rajab

Jamāl al-Dīn Yūsuf ibn al-Hasan ibn Ahmad ibn al-Hasan ibn Ahmad ibn ʻAbd al-Hādī al-Salihi (1436–1503), commonly known as Ibn al-Mibrād (Arabic: ابن المبرد) was a Syrian Muslim scholar of the Hanbali school of thought. His magnum opus is considered by later Hanbalis to be the Ghāyat al-sūl ilā ʿilm al-uṣūl, an introductory treatise into principles of Islamic jurisprudence within the context of the Hanbali methodology. He was a direct descendant of the second Rashidun caliph, Umar ibn al-Khattab.

== Works ==
- Ghāyat al-sūl ilā ʿilm al-uṣūl (The Ultimate Goal in the Science of Fundamentals) – A treatise on how ʾUṣūl al-Fiqh is handled in the Hanbali school of thought. It details how the Hanbali scholars derive rulings on what is considered permissible or impermissible, as well as how rulings in general are derived by scholars. It also serves as a guide and dictionary to how things in the Qur'an and related Hadith are interpreted.
- Al-Arbaʿūn al-Mukhtārah min Ḥadīth al-Imām Abī Ḥanīfah (Forty Selected Hadiths from al-Imam Abu Hanifa) – This is Ibn al-Mibrad's book in the Forty Hadith genre of Islamic studies and literature. It compiles Hadith that were transmitted by Abu Hanifa al-Nu'man, the founder of the Hanafi school of thought.
- Jamʿ al-Juyūsh wa-al-Dasākir ʿalā Ibn ʿAsākir (Assembling the Armies and Garrisons Against Ibn ʿAsākir) – A treatise in manuscript form which is a literary criticism of Syrian Muslim scholar Ibn Asakir's works, mainly the polemic book Tabyīn Kadhib al-Muftarī.

== See also ==
- Ibn Qudama
- List of Atharis
- List of Hanbalis
