= Silsalat al-Hadith as-Sahiha =

Book of Hadiths by Al-Albani

- Author: Muhammad Nasir al-Din al-Albani
- Original title: سلسلة الأحاديث الصحيحة
- Language: Arabic
- Subject: Hadith
- Genre: Islamic literature
- Media type: Print (Hardcover & Paperback)

Silsalat al-Hadith as-Sahiha (lit. 'The Series of Authentic Hadiths') is a hadith work compiled by the hadith scholar Muhammad Nasir al-Din al-Albani, in which he collected authentic hadiths (as described in hadith terminology), organized into jurisprudential chapters. It discusses approximately 900 hadiths. Most chapters begin with the benefits of the hadith, then the Islamic rulings (Arabic: أحكام, romanized: aḥkām) derived from it. The last two chapters add, after the benefits and rulings, a discussion of the hadith's overall meaning.

== See also ==
- List of hadith books
