= Muhammad Jamil ash-Shatti =

Muḥammad Jamīl ash-Shaṭṭī (1882–1958) was a Syrian judge, poet, and Islamic scholar of the Hanbali school. As a Hanbali scholar, he held a position as a leading member of the Hanbalis of Damascus and a preacher at the Hanabila Mosque.

== Biography ==
Muhammad Jamil ibn Umar was born in the year 1882 in Baghdad, Iraq during Ottoman rule, but later moved to Damascus, Syria. He was a member of the scholarly Ash-Shatti family and a paternal cousin of Mustafa ash-Shatti, a scholar of the Hanbali school and the former Mufti of Douma who dealt with poetry and combating extremism. In his adulthood, Ash-Shatti studied with his uncle, before moving on to study Hadith under the muhaddith and theologian Bakr al-Attar and later a Shafi'i Ash'ari scholar, Badr al-Din al-Hasani and a Salafi reformist, Jamal al-Din al-Qasimi. In 1918, he was appointed as the Mufti of the Hanbalis of Damascus and allowed to give fatwas based on the school's opinions. He was also given the role of a qāḍī.

In 1934, Ash-Shatti became a preacher at the Hanabila Mosque, where he taught classes and gave sermons. He was also the primary source for Islamic inheritance jurisprudence in Damascus, with the Ministry of Endowments and the financial boards requesting help from him when faced with problems relating to inheritance. Around this time, the Ahmadiyya movement began to enter Syria under Mirza Basheer-ud-Din Mahmood Ahmad, which led to Ash-Shatti writing a treatise exposing the Ahmadis for their core beliefs, which he deemed heretical. Ash-Shatti also published a shorter treatise against Wahhabism, although unlike the Ahmadis, he considered the Wahhabis to be Muslims, just misguided. He later took an interest in poetry, composing sets of poems in reverence of Islam.

Ash-Shatti passed away in 1958 due to old age. He was buried in the Al-Dahdah Cemetery in Damascus.

== Works ==
- Mukhtaṣar Ṭabaqāt al-Ḥanābila: First published in 1921 by Maṭbaʿat al-Taraqqī, this work is a Mukhtaṣar ("abridged version") of the Tabaqat al-Hanabila, a collection of biographies of prominent Hanbali scholars. Ash-Shatti's rendition of the texts are shorter, and omit any detail which he deems unnecessary.
- al-Wasīṭ fī al-Ifrāṭ wa al-Tafriṭ, fī al-Radd ʿalā al-Salafiyyah al-Wahhābiyyah: A book refuting the emerging ideology of Wahhabism and the Salafi movement, which had gained prominence in Damascus at the time. Ash-Shatti criticizes the founder of Wahhabism, Ibn Abdul Wahhab, for his interpretation of takfir and the violence of the Najdis; although he considers them to still be Muslims, just ghulat ("extremist").

== See also ==
- List of Hanbalis
- List of Atharis
