= Al-Albani =

Albanian Islamic scholar (1914–1999)

Imam Shaykh Muhaddith Nasir al-Din al-Albani

Personal life
- Born: Muhamed Nasirudin Nexhati; 16 August 1914 Shkodër, Albania
- Died: 2 October 1999 (aged 85) Amman, Jordan
- Resting place: Amman, Jordan
- Parent: Nuh Nexhati (father)
- Era: Modern
- Main interests: Hadith; Aqida; Fiqh
- Notable work(s): Silsilat al-Ahadith al-Daifa wa al-Mawduwa, Silsalat al-Hadith as-Sahiha
- Occupation: Muhaddith; Faqih; Writer; Carpenter; Watchmaker

Religious life
- Religion: Islam
- Jurisprudence: Ghayr Muqallid
- Creed: Athari
- Movement: Salafism

Muslim leader
- Influenced by: Shaykh al-Hajj Nuh Bin Najati Bin al-Ishqudri al-Hanafi al-Albani al-Arnauti; Ahmad ibn Hanbal; Ibn Taymiyya; Ibn Hazm; Imam Bukhari; Muhammad ibn Abd al-Wahhab; Badi' ud-Din Shah al-Rashidi; Rashid Rida; Shaykh Saeed al Burhani; Ibn al Baghi; 'Izz al-Din al-Tanoukhi; Muhammad Bahjat al-Atar; Ibn Baz
- Influenced: Ibn Baz; Rabi' al-Madkhali; Umar Sulayman al-Ashqar; Al-Wadi'i; Salim Al-Hilali; Shaykh Mashhoor Hasan Salmaan; Muhammad bin Jamil Zeno; Abu Ishaq al-Huwayni; Abdul Qayum; Jusuf Barčić; Salih Ibn S'aad As Suhaymi; Ismail Falah Al Mandakar; Ali Hasan Al Halabi
- Awards: King Faisal International Prize (in 1999)

Muhammad Nasir al-Din al-Albani (Note: Arabic: مُحَمَّد نَاصِر ٱلدِّيْن الْأَلْبَانِي; Albanian: Muhamed Nazir ed-Din) (born Muhamed Nasirudin Nexhati; 16 August 1914 – 3 October 1999), commonly known as al-Albani, (Note: Arabic: الْأَلْبَانِي, lit. 'the Albanian'. Albanian: El-Albani) was an Albanian Islamic hadith scholar (muhaddith), regarded as one of the prominent figures of modern Salafism. He was known for his rigorous re-evaluation of hadith literature and for rejecting adherence to traditional schools of jurisprudence. Al-Albani became a controversial yet-influential reformer within Sunni Islam.

He was twice imprisoned in Syria for his teachings and later lectured at the Islamic University of Madinah at the invitation of Ibn Baz. He authored over 200 works, including Silsalat al-Hadith al-Sahiha and Sifat Salat al-Nabi. His reassessment of canonical hadiths drew both acclaim and criticism, earning him, among Salafis, the title 'al-Bukhari of the contemporary age'.

== Early life and education ==
al-Albani was born on 16 August 1914 in Shkodër, Albania, to a family adhering to the Hanafi school of Jurisprudence within Sunni Islam. His father, Nuh Nexhati, was a jurist of the Hanafi jurisprudence, trained in Istanbul. Fearing the rise of secularism during the rule of Zog I, Nexhati withdrew his son from school in Albania. In 1923, when al-Albani was nine years old, he and his family moved to Damascus, Syria, then under French occupation.

=== Education ===
In Damascus, al-Albani began his religious studies under his father and several local scholars, where he was taught the Qur'an and other Islamic sciences. He learned Arabic at al-Is'af, a non-profit civil school, where he came to be known as al-Albani ('the Albanian') after leaving formal schooling to focus on writing. He studied the renowned Hanafi text Maraqi al-Falah by al-Shurunbulali (d. 1659) under Sa'id al-Burhani and also studied the book Mukhtasar al-Quduri with his native Syrian teachers. During this time, he earned a modest living as a carpenter before joining his father as a watchmaker.

Despite his father's discouragement from pursuing hadith studies, al-Albani became interested in the field around the age of twenty, influenced by the Lebanese-born reformist scholar Muhammad Rashid Rida. Al-Albani studied under a number of scholars, including Muhammad Bahjat al-Baytar, 'Izz al-Din al-Tanoukhi, Sa'id al-Burhani, Ibn al-Baghi, who collectively encouraged his growing focus on hadith. His early scholarly work included a commentary on Mughni 'an haml al-asfar fi al-asfar fi takhrij ma fi al-ahya' min al-akhbar by Abd al-Rahim ibn al-Husain al-'Iraqi, which marked the beginning of al-Albani's scholarly career and brought him recognition within Damascus's religious circles.

== Career ==
Al-Albani began writing a series of lectures, books, and articles, some of which were published in al-Manar magazine. Over time, he began teaching two weekly lessons on Islamic creed (aqidah), jurisprudence (fiqh) and Hadith, attracting students and university professors alike. He also organized preaching and advocacy trips to various cities of Syria and Jordan.

In 1961, he was among many scholars invited by Saudi Arabia to teach at the newly established Islamic University of Madinah. In 1963, al-Albani left Saudi Arabia due to the hostility stemming partly from his views, including his suggestion that Muhammad ibn Abd al-Wahhab was not entirely Salafi due to his adherence to Hanbali school, and criticized him for exaggeration and harshness. Following this, he resumed his studies and work at the Zahiriyya Library in Damascus, leaving his watch shop to one of his brothers.

Al-Albani visited various countries, including Qatar, Egypt, Kuwait, Spain, and the United Kingdom to deliver lectures and engage in preaching. After the intervention of Grand Mufti Ibn Baz, al-Albani was invited again to Saudi Arabia to serve as the head of higher education in Islamic law in Mecca. He later returned to Syria, and eventually settled in Jordan, where he lived for the remainder of his life.

== Views ==
Al-Albani was a prominent proponent of Salafism, and is regarded as one of the foremost 20th-century figures. He criticized the mainstream Sunni legal schools, Hanafi, Maliki, Shafi'i, Hanbali and even Zahiri. He also rejected the traditional view that Muslims should perform taqlid of a madhhab (school of jurisprudence). Instead, he spent much of his life critically re-evaluating hadith literature, arguing that many widely accepted hadith narrations were unsound. His independent rulings often diverged from mainstream Sunni consensus.

Al-Albani's legal and theological positions often ran counter to the wider Islamic consensus. These include his opinions that mihrabs were a religious innovation (bid'ah), and that it was permissible to pray in a mosque while wearing shoes. He also stated that it is prohibited for women to wear gold bracelets, and his 1952 book, Hijab al-Mar'a al-Muslima fi-l-Kitab wa-l-Sunna, argued that it was permissible for a woman's face to remain uncovered.

Most notably, he called on Palestinians to leave the occupied territories, arguing that they could not properly practice their faith there. This stance provoked significant criticism, including from within the Wahhabi movement itself.

=== Critique of reformists and Islamists ===
While he praised Muhammad ibn Abd al-Wahhab for his reformist dawah movement in Najd, he also criticized him for what he described as "exaggeration and harshness" and for being "weak in hadith and jurisprudence". Al-Albani was among the leading Salafi scholars who preached against what they considered the warped literalism of extremists. They believed that Muslims should focus on purifying their beliefs and practice and that, in time, "God would bring victory over the forces of falsehood and unbelief."

Al-Albani criticized influential Islamist thinkers such as Sayyid Qutb, whom he accused of theological deviation for holding the belief in the Oneness of Being. Al-Albani also accused Hassan al-Banna, the leader of the Muslim Brotherhood, of not being a religious scholar and holding positions contrary to the Sunna.

== Criticism ==
Al-Albani's works attracted criticism from a wide range of scholars. In the early 1970s, Syrian hadith scholar Abd al-Fattah Abu Ghudda (d. 1997) published a tract against al-Albani's re-evaluation of Sahih al-Bukhari and Sahih Muslim. The Egyptian hadith scholar Mahmud Sa'id Mamduh, who studied with Abu Ghudda and 'Abdallah b. al-Siddiq al-Ghumari, wrote at least four rebuttals of al-Albani's work on different subjects. In 1987, Mamduh published a work entitled Alerting the Muslim to al-Albani's Transgression upon Sahih Muslim, in which he argued that:

Indeed, I have concluded that his methods disagree with those of the jurists and hadith scholars, and that his methods are creating great disarray and evident disruption in the proofs of jurisprudence both generally and specifically. He lacks trust in the Imams of law and hadith, as well as in the rich hadith and law tradition handed down to us, in which the umma has taken great pride.

The Syrian Ash'ari scholar Muhammad Said Ramadan al-Bouti, criticized al-Albani's anti-madhhab stance and his call for all Palestinians to leave the occupied territories, the West Bank, and Gaza. He wrote two rebuttals of al-Albani entitled Anti-Madhabism: the Dangers of an Innovation that Threaten the Sharia and Salafiyya: a Blessed Historical Period, Not a School of Fiqh. Other critics included Syrian hadith scholars Nur al-Din Itr and Abdullah Sirajuddin al-Husayni Lebanese Sufi scholar Gibril Fouad Haddad, who called al-Albani "the chief innovator of our time," and the Jordanian theologian Hasan b. Ali al-Saqqaf, who composed a book entitled Dictionary of al-Albani's Slanderings.

== Works ==
Emad Hamdeh has described al-Albani as a prolific scholar, authoring more than 200 works on hadith, jurisprudence, and creed. His notable writings include Silsalat al-Hadith as-Sahiha, Silsilat al-Ahadith al-Daifa wa al-Mawduwa and Sifat Salat al-Nabi min al-Takbir ila al-Taslim ka-Annaka Taraha ("Characteristics of the Prophet's prayer, from beginning to end as though you were witnessing it"). Many of his articles were published in al-Manar magazine, and his teachings inspired a generation of students in Syria, Jordan, and Saudi Arabia. His reassessment of canonical hadith collections such as Sahih al-Bukhari and Sahih Muslim sparked both praise and criticism, earning him among Salafis the epithet 'al-Bukhari of the contemporary age'.

Al-Albani's works in Fields of hadith and its sciences
Title	Volumes	Description
Sahih ut-Targhib wat-Tarhib	Volumes 1–4	Re-evaluation of At-Targhib wat-Tarhib by Al-Mundhiri. (Link to the text)
At-Tasfiyah wa't-Tarbiyah wa Haajatul-Muslimeen Ilayhimaa		Based on a lectures by al-Albani.
At-Tawassulu: Anwa'uhu wa Ahkamuhu		Tawassul: Its Types & Its Rulings) (link to English translation)
Irwa al-Ghalil	Volumes 1–9	Verification and commentary on book of Hanbali school Minār as-Sabīl by ad-Duwayyān.
Talkhis Ahkam al-Jana'iz		About the rules and regulations surrounding funerals in Islam.
Sahih wa Da'if Sunan Abu Dawood	Volumes 1–4	Re-evaluation of hadith collection Sunan Abi Dawud
Sahih wa Da'if Sunan at-Tirmidhi	Volumes 1–4	Re-evaluation of hadith collection Sunan al-Tirmidhi
Sahih wa Da'if Sunan Ibn Majah	Volumes 1–4	Re-evaluation of hadith collection Sunan ibn Majah
Al-Aqidah at-Tahawiyyah Sharh wa Ta'liq		Commentary on Al-Aqidah al-Tahawiyyah, originally authored by Abu Ja'far al-Tahawi.
Sifatu Salati An-Nabiyy		Describes Muhammad's method of prayer, from beginning to end. (link to English translation)
Silsilat al-Ahadith al-Daifa wa al-Mawduwa	Volumes 1–14	Widely considered al-Albani's magnum opus, a comprehensive hadith compilation that systematically collects, analyzes, and categorizes weak and fabricated narrations.
Silsalat al-Hadith as-Sahiha	Volumes 1–11	Collection of authentic hadiths (as described in hadith terminology), organized into jurisprudential chapters. It discusses approximately 900 hadiths.
Salat ut-Tarawih		Treatise, whose full title is often cited as Salat ut-Tarawih wa Qiyam Ramadan, deals with the night prayers in Ramadan. Later an abridgment of this book was published by al-Albani – Qiyamu Ramadhan

=== Formula for Salah (Prayer) ===
Among al-Albani's most well known works is his book in which he redefined the proper gestures and formula of Muslim prayer (Salah) based strictly on hadith attributed to the Islamic prophet Muhammad. His conclusions diverged from the prescriptions of all established Sunni schools of jurisprudence. As he argued that several details of the traditional prayer were based on weak hadith, the book provoked considerable controversy.

== Later life and death ==
After decades of teaching and writing, al-Albani eventually settled in Jordan, where he continued to lecture and receive visitors. He died in Amman on 2 October 1999 at the age of 85. His wife was Umm al-Fadl.

== See also ==
- Abdul-Qadir al-Arna'ut
- Shu'ayb al-Arna'ut

== Sources ==
- Brachman, Jarret M. (2008-09-03). Global Jihadism: Theory and Practice. Routledge. p. 33. ISBN 978-1-1340-5541-8.
- Brown, Jonathan (2007). The Canonization of Al-Bukhari and Muslim: The Formation and Function of the Sunni Hadith Canon. Brill Publishers. p. 325. ISBN 978-9004158399.
- Brown, Jonathan A. C. (2014). Misquoting Muhammad: The Challenge and Choices of Interpreting the Prophet's Legacy. Oneworld Publications. p. 129. ISBN 978-1780744209.
- Bruinessen, Martin van; Allievi, Stefano (2013-06-17). Producing Islamic Knowledge: Transmission and Dissemination in Western Europe. Routledge. p. 5. ISBN 978-1-1369-3286-1.
- Cook, David (2015-09-01). Understanding Jihad. University of California Press. p. 123. ISBN 978-0-5209-6249-1.
- Hamdeh, Emad (July 2016). "The Formative Years of an Iconoclastic Salafi Scholar". The Muslim World. 106 (3): 411–432. doi:10.1111/muwo.12157. ISSN 0027-4909.
- Hamdeh, Emad (2017-06-09). "Qurʾān and Sunna or the Madhhabs?: A Salafi Polemic Against Islamic Legal Tradition". Islamic Law and Society. 24 (3): 211–253. doi:10.1163/15685195-00240A01. ISSN 1568-5195.
- Hamdeh, Emad (2021). Salafism and Traditionalism: Scholarly Authority in Modern Islam. Cambridge University Press. p. 41. ISBN 978-1-108-61836-6. "A prolific scholar, he authored 217 books on various topics such as ḥadīth, fiqh, and creed."
- Hegghammer, Thomas; Lacroix, Stéphane (February 2007). "Rejectionist Islamism in Saudi Arabia: The Story of Juhayman al-ʿUtaybi Revisited" (PDF). International Journal of Middle East Studies. 39 (1): 103–122. doi:10.1017/S0020743807002553. JSTOR 4129114. S2CID 163081762.
- Inge, Anabel (2016-01-01). The Making of a Salafi Muslim Woman: Paths to Conversion. Oxford University Press. p. 25. ISBN 9780-1-9061-1675.
- Ismail, Raihan (2021-10-01). Rethinking Salafism: The Transnational Networks of Salafi 'Ulama in Egypt, Kuwait, and Saudi Arabia. Oxford University Press. pp. 160–161. ISBN 978-0-19-094897-9.
- Lacroix, Stephane; Holoch, George (2011-08-15). Awakening Islam. Harvard University Press. pp. 68–220. ISBN 978-0-6740-6107-1.
- Lav, Daniel (2012). Radical Islam and the Revival of Medieval Theology. Cambridge University Press. ISBN 978-1-1070-0964-6.
- Mandaville, Peter G. (2022). Wahhabism and the World: Understanding Saudi Arabia's Global Influence on Islam. Oxford University Press. p. 83. ISBN 978-0-19-753256-0.
- Meijer, Roel (2009-10-01). Global Salafism: Islam's new religious movement. New York, the USA: C. Hurst & Co., Columbia University Press. pp. 63–68. ISBN 9781850659792. "In this way he became a self-taught expert on Islam, learning from the books rather than the ulema. One of his biographers even states that al-Albani was distinguished in religious circles by how few ijazats (certificates) he possessed."
- Norris, Harry Thirlwall (1993). Islam in the Balkans: religion and society between Europe and the Arab world. Columbia: University of South Carolina Press. ISBN 978-0-87249-977-5.
- Pierret, Thomas (2013-03-25). Religion and State in Syria: The Sunni Ulama from Coup to Revolution. Cambridge University Press. p. 106. ISBN 978-1-1070-2641-4.
- Rabil, Robert (2014-10-24). Salafism in Lebanon: From Apoliticism to Transnational Jihadism. Georgetown University Press. p. 3. ISBN 978-1-62616-118-4.
- Thurston, Alexander (2016). Salafism in Nigeria: Islam, Preaching, and Politics. Cambridge University Press. ISBN 978-1-1071-5743-9.
- Wagemakers, Joas (2016). Salafism in Jordan: Political Islam in a Quietist Community. Cambridge, United Kingdom: Cambridge University Press. ISBN 978-1-10716-366-9.
