= Abu Bakr al-Khallal =

Muslim jurist (died 923)

Abu Bakr al-Khallal أبو بكر الخلال

Personal life
- Born: Ahmad bin Muhammad
- Died: 311 AH / 923 CE
- Era: Islamic Golden Age
- Region: Mesopotamia
- Main interest: Fiqh

Religious life
- Religion: Islam
- Denomination: Sunni
- Jurisprudence: Hanbali
- Creed: Athari

Muslim leader
- Influenced by: Ahmad ibn Hanbal
- Influenced: Ghulam al-Khallal

ʾAḥmad ibn Muḥammad ibn Hārūn ibn Yazīd al-Baghdādī (Arabic: أبو بكر الخلال) better known as Abū Bakr al-Khalāl, was a Medieval Muslim jurist.

Al-Khallal was a student of five of Ahmad ibn Hanbal's direct students, including Ibn Hanbal's son Abdullah. His documentation on Ibn Hanbal's views eventually reached twenty volumes and ultimately led to the preservation of the Hanbali school of Islamic law. He was considered the principal Hanbalite scholar of his time.

== Life ==
Al-Khallal's exact date of birth is not known. He died in 923, which means that he would have been born during Ahmad ibn Hanbal's twilight years. The Oxford International Encyclopaedia of Legal History estimates al-Khallal's year of birth as 848.

Aside from his legal efforts, virtually nothing is known of al-Khallal's life. During his efforts to compile the views of Ahmad ibn Hanbal, al-Khallal ended up spending periods of time living in Fars province, Syria and Mesopotamia. According to Muslim historian al-Dhahabi, there was no such thing as an independent Hanbalite school of law prior to al-Khallal's efforts at compiling Ibn Hanbal's views. Al-Khallal's status within the school was not universally accepted, and he and his students were often in conflict with fellow Hanbalite Al-Hasan ibn 'Ali al-Barbahari and his students.

== Reception ==
The historian al-Dhahabi stated that, "Before him (al-Khallal) there were no independent school of the Imam's; not until he followed up Ahmad's texts, wrote them down and checked their proofs after 300."

The 20th century Hanbali jurisprudent Ibn Badran called al-Khallal's collection "the very root of the Hanbali school, from which sprang all later books of Hanbali jurisprudence."
