= Abu Ishaq al-Huwayni =

Egyptian Islamic preacher (1956–2025)

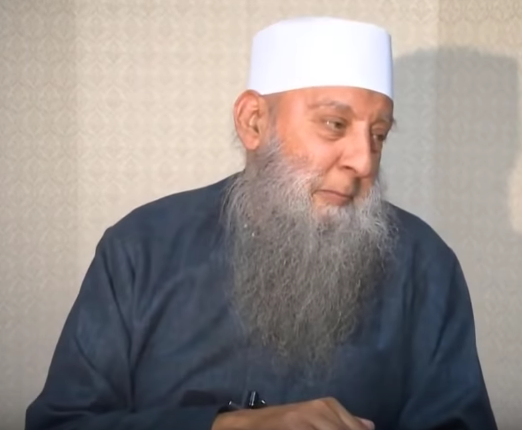
- Abu Ishaq al-Huwayni in 2020

Personal life
- Born: Hijazi Muhammad Yousuf Sharif; 10 June 1956 Hewen, Kafr el-Sheikh Governorate, Egypt
- Died: 17 March 2025 (aged 68) Doha, Qatar
- Region: Egypt
- Main interest: Hadith sciences
- Education: Ain Shams University, Faculty of Al-Alsun, Spanish department

Religious life
- Religion: Islam
- Jurisprudence: Shafi‘i
- Creed: Athari
- Movement: Salafism

Muslim leader
- Influenced by: Ibn Baz, Al-Albani, Ibn Uthaymin, Abd al-Hamid Kishk

Hijazi Muhammad Yusuf Sharif (10 June 1956 – 17 March 2025), better known by his nickname Abu Ishaq al-Huwayni (Arabic: أبو إسحاق الحوينى), was an Egyptian Islamic preacher and scholar. A prominent scholar in the field of Hadith, he authored several books and appeared on several Islamic TV shows on several channels such as Al-Nas, Al-Rahma and Al-Hekma.

== Biography ==
Al-Huwayni was born on 10 June 1956, in the village of Huwain, in Egypt's Kafr El-Sheikh Governorate.

Al-Huwayni was raised in a household of righteousness and virtue. His father was a devout man who loved his religion and revered its laws. As al-Huwayni himself recounted, his father was known for fasting frequently and praying at night. He was also highly respected among the people of the village, who regarded him as their elder. His counsel was often sought in resolving disputes and conflicts among them.

He began seeking knowledge at the age of eleven and attended the lessons of Sheikh Muhammad Najib Al-Muti‘i in Shafi'i jurisprudence.

He graduated from the Faculty of Al-Alsun, Spanish Department, ranking first in his class every year except for the final year, in which he ranked second.

He stayed in Al-Mustafa Library for a long time, striving in the pursuit of knowledge. He would seek it during the day and work at night to support himself. He traveled to Jordan to seek knowledge from Al-Albani and is considered among his earliest students.

Some people controversially claimed that he said "a woman's face is like her genitals," but these words are out of their context, as he was talking about hijab and what should be covered.

== Works ==
al-Huwayni's works in Fields of hadith and its sciences
Title	Description
Takhrij Tafsir Ibn Kathir	Referencing (Verification and Acceptance) all hadith in Tafsir Ibn Kathir
Ath-Thamar Ad-Dani fi Adh-Dhab ‘an Al-Albani	Biography of Muhammad Nasiruddin al-Albani
Tahqiq Ad-Dibaj Sharh Sahih Muslim li As-Suyuti	Referencing (Verification and Acceptance) all hadith in al-Suyuti book on Sahih Muslim
Badhul Ihsan bi Takhrij Sunan An-Nasa’i Abi Abdir-Rahman	Referencing (Verification and Acceptance) all hadith in the book of Al-Nasa'i
Tahqiq An-Nasikh wal-Mansukh li Ibn Shahin	Referencing (Verification and Acceptance) all hadith in An-Nasikh wal-Mansukh
Masis Al-Hajah ila Takhrij Sunan Ibn Majah	Referencing (Verification and Acceptance) all hadith in the book of Ibn Majah
Ithaf An-Naqim bi Wahm Adh-Dhahabi wal-Hakim	Referencing (Verification and Acceptance) all hadith in the book of Al-Hakim al-Nishapuri and Al-Dhahabi
An-Nafilah fil-Ahadith Ad-Da‘ifah wal-Batilah	Miscellaneous rejected Hadith
Tanbih Al-Hajid ila ma Waqa‘ min An-Nazhar fi Kutub Al-Amājid	
Sharh wa Tahqiq Al-Mughni ‘an Al-Hifz wal-Kitab bi Qawlihim Lam Yashih Shay’ fi Hadha Al-Bab In addition to his major works, he has also written numerous short treatises, including: Simt Al-Ali fi Ar-Radd ‘ala Al-Ghazali; Sahih Al-Qisas An-Nabawi; Tahqiq Fada’il Fatimah li Ibn Shahin; Kashf Al-Makhbu’ bi Thubut Hadith At-Tasmiyah ‘ind Al-Wudu’; Nahy As-Suhbah ‘an An-Nuzul bil-Rukbah	

== Death and legacy ==
He died on 17 March 2025, at the age of 68. He is regarded by Muslim devotees as a prominent scholar in the field of hadith and is known for his efforts in calling people to Islam and guiding them to the teachings of the religion.

== Extra links ==
- طلعت, سعيد حجازى وإسراء (14 June 2015). "تبرعات بالملايين من الخليج ورجال أعمال مصريين لـ". الوطن (in Arabic).
