= Al-Mahaqirah =

Al-Mahaqirah متنة
- Village
- Location in Yemen
- Coordinates: 15.21329°N 44.2665°E
- Country: Yemen
- Governorate: Sanaa
- District: Sanhan
- Elevation: 7,657 ft (2,334 m)
- Time zone: UTC+3 (Yemen Standard Time)

Al-Mahaqirah (Arabic: المحاقرة al-Maḥāqirah) is a small village in Sanhan District of Sanaa Governorate, Yemen. It lies about 15 km from Sanaa, just east of the road to Ta'izz.

== History ==
The earliest known mention of Matnah in historical sources is in 1396 (798 AH), in the Ghayat al-amani of Yahya ibn al-Husayn. That year, its fort was destroyed by one Ali ibn Salah al-Din.
