= Mansur al-Buhuti =

Egyptian writer and scholar

Mansur ibn Yunus al-Buhuti al-Hasani al-Hanbali
- Title: Shaykh al-Hanabilah

Personal life
- Born: 1000 A.H / 1591 C.E.
- Died: 1051 A.H / 1641 C.E.
- Main interest: Fiqh
- Notable work(s): Sharh al-Muntaha, Kashshaf al-Qina, al-Rawd al-Murbi, Umdah al-Talib, Manh al-Shafiyat

Religious life
- Religion: Islam
- Denomination: Sunni
- School: Hanbali
- Creed: Athari

Muslim leader
- Influenced by: Ahmad ibn Hanbal, Ibn Taymiyya
- Influenced: Muhammad b. Ahmad b. 'Ali al-Buhūtī al-Khalwati (d. 1088 AH)

Shaykh Manṣūr Ibn Yūnus Al-Buhūtī (c. 1592 – July 1641), better known as al-Buhūtī, was an Egyptian Islamic Jurist. He espoused the Hanbali school of Islam and is widely considered to be the final editor and commentator (Khātimat-al-Muḥaqiqīn). His legal writings are considered well-researched and concise, and are still studied and highly revered in Hanbali circles in Saudi Arabia, Syria, Qatar, Kuwait, UAE, and Egypt. From his most notable works is al-Rawd Al Murbi’ Sharh Zād Al Mustaqni which is studied by intermediate students of Hanbali jurisprudence.

He also wrote commentaries on advanced works of jurisprudence, such as Sharh al-Muntahā, and Kashhaf al-Qina, as well as an abridged text for beginners entitled Umdat al-Talib.

He was born in Buhut, Egypt in 1591 and died in Cairo in July 1641, at the age of 51.
