= Ibn Battah =

Hanbali legal jurist

Ibn Battah al-Ukbari

Personal life
- Born: c. 917 (304 AH) 'Ukbara
- Died: 997 (387 AH)
- Era: Medieval era
- Region: Iraqi scholar
- Notable idea: Al-Ibanah al-Kubra

Religious life
- Religion: Islam
- Denomination: Sunni
- Jurisprudence: Hanbali
- Creed: Athari

Muslim leader
- Influenced by: Ahmad bin Hanbal and al-Barbahaaree
- Influenced: Abu al-Fath al-Fawaris, Ibn Taymiyya, Salafi movement, Ahl al-Hadith

Abu Abdullah `Ubaidullah ibn Muhammad ibn Battah al-Ukbari al-Hanbali, simply known as Ibn Battah al-`Ukbari was a Hanbali theologian and jurisconsult born at 'Ukbara in 304/c. 917. He learned from a number of Hanbali scholars of his time and also personally knew al-Barbahari.

Ibn Battah al-Ukbari was severely attacked by al-Khatib al-Baghdadi though he was defended by Ibn al-Jawzi who was much influenced by him.

== Books ==
- Al-Ibāna (Al-Kubra/Al-Sugra); Kitab al-Sharh wa al-Ibanah Ala Usul al-Sunnah wa al-Dinayah in Henry Laoust, La Profession de foi d'Ibn Batta. Damascus: Institut Francais de Damas, 1958.
- Al-Sunna
- Al-Manāsik
- Taḥrīm al-Namīma
- Ibṭāl al-Ḥiyal

== See also ==
- Hanbali Scholars
