= Ibn Qudama =

Islamic scholar and theologian (1147–1223)

Shaykh al-Islām Ibn Qudama ٱبْن قُدَامَة
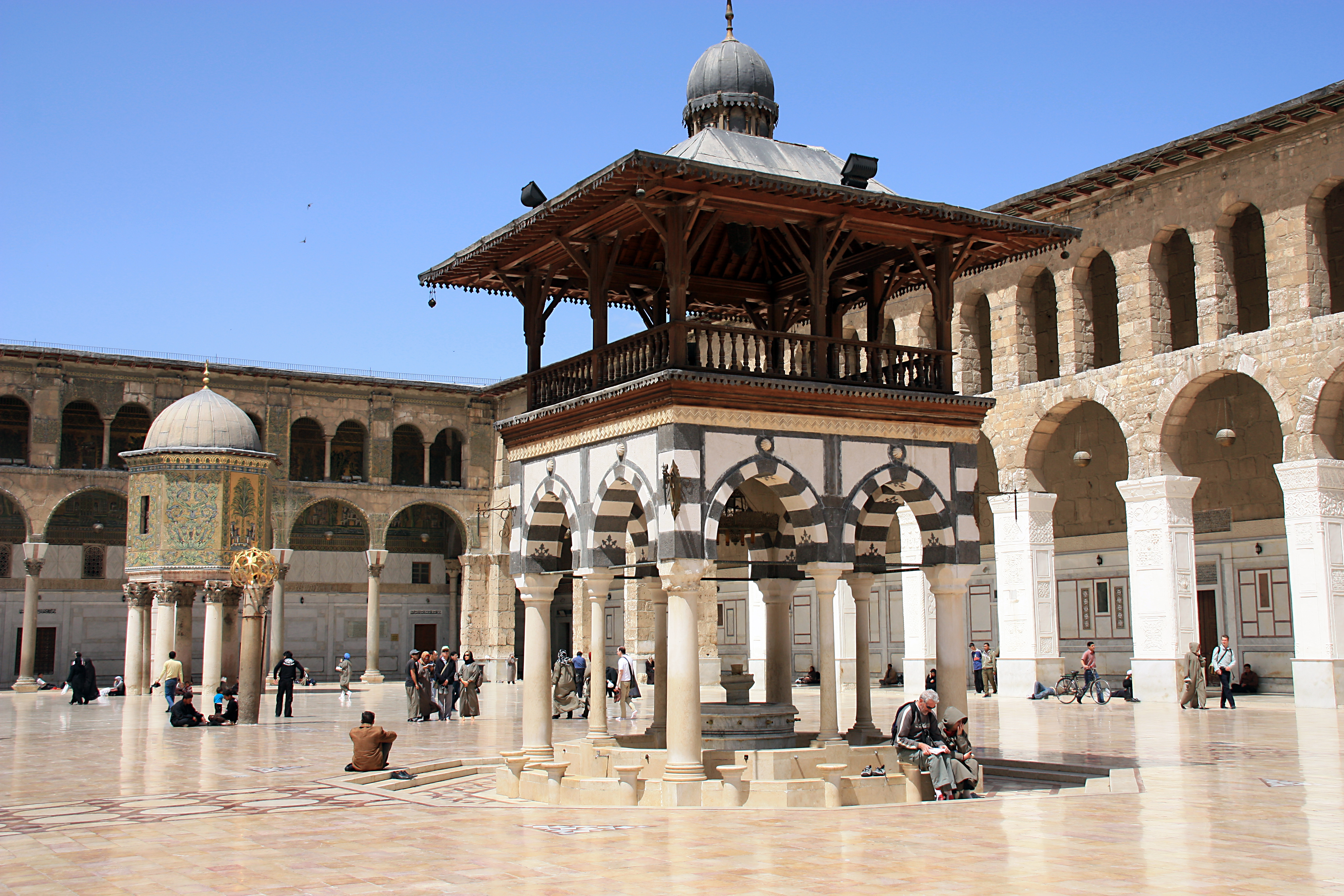
- A 2010 photograph of the Umayyad Mosque in Damascus, Syria, where Ibn Qudama frequently taught and prayed

Personal life
- Born: January–February 1147; 541 AH Jamma'in, Nablus, Kingdom of Jerusalem, Palestine
- Died: July 7, 1223; Shawwal 1, 620 AH (aged 79) Damascus, Ayyubid Levant, Syria
- Resting place: Tomb of Imam Ibn Qudama, Damascus, Syria
- Region: Damascus, Syria
- Main interest(s): Jurisprudence, creed
- Notable work(s): Lumat al-Itiqad, Al-Umdah, al-Muqni', al-Kafi, al-Mughni, al-Wasiyyah
- Occupation: Scholar, jurist, theologian, traditionist, ascetic

Religious life
- Religion: Islam
- Denomination: Sunni
- Jurisprudence: Hanbali
- Tariqa: Qadiri
- Creed: Athari

Muslim leader
- Influenced by: Ahmad ibn Hanbal, al-Barbahari, Abd al-Qadir al-Jilani, Ibn al-Jawzi
- Influenced: Ibn Taymiyya, Ibn al-Qayyim, Ibn Rajab, virtually all later Hanbali scholars

Muwaffaq al-Dīn Abū Muḥammad ʿAbd Allāh ibn Aḥmad ibn Muḥammad ibn Qudāma al-Maqdisī (Arabic: ابن قدامة المقدسي; January–February 1147 – 7 July 1223), commonly known as Ibn Qudāma, was a Sunni Islamic scholar, jurist, Athari theologian, and ascetic of the Hanbali school of Islamic jurisprudence. He is regarded as one of the most authoritative classical figures of the Hanbali tradition and played a significant role in its development and transmission during the medieval period.

Born in the village of Jamma'in near Jerusalem, Ibn Qudāmah migrated in his youth to Damascus, which became the main center of his scholarly activity. He later traveled to Baghdad, then a leading center of Hanbali learning, where he studied under prominent scholars before returning to Damascus to teach and write.

Ibn Qudāmah is best known for his major work al-Mughnī, a comprehensive legal encyclopedia that compares juristic opinions across the Sunni schools while presenting the Hanbali position in detail. He also authored influential works such as ʿUmdat al-Fiqh, al-Kāfī, Rawḍat al-Nāẓir, and Lumʿat al-Iʿtiqād. In theology, he adhered to the Atharī tradition and emphasized adherence to the Qurʾān and Sunnah, and his works remain widely studied in Sunni Islamic scholarship.

== Life ==
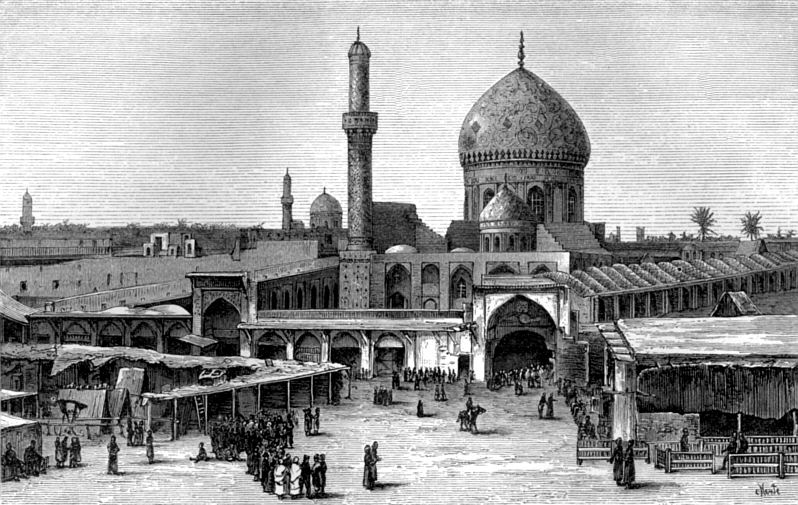
An 1876 wood-engraving of the market-places of Baghdad by John Philip Newman; Ibn Qudama visited this city three times in his life, having studied and taught in many of its most prominent areas in 1166, 1189, and 1196

Ibn Qudama was born in Palestine in Jammain, a town near Jerusalem (Bayt al-Maqdīs in the Arabic vernacular, whence his extended name), in 1147 during the Crusades to the revered Hanbali preacher and mystic Aḥmad b. Muḥammad b. Qudāma (d. 1162), "a man known for his asceticism" and in whose honor "a mosque was [later] built in Damascus." Having received the first phase of his education in Damascus, where he studied the Quran and the hadith extensively, Ibn Qudama made his first trip to Baghdad in 1166, in order to study law and Sufi mysticism under the tutelage of the renowned Hanbali mystic and jurist Abdul-Qadir Gilani (d. ca. 1167), who would go on to become one of the most widely venerated scholars in all of Sunni Islam. Although Ibn Qudama's "discipleship was cut short by the latter’s death ... [the] experience [of studying under Abdul-Qadir Gilani] ... had its influence on the young" scholar, "who was to reserve a special place in his heart for mystics and mysticism" for the rest of his life.

Ibn Qudama's first stay in Baghdad lasted four years, during which time he is also said to have written an important work criticizing what he deemed to be the excessive rationalism of Ibn Aqil (d. 1119), entitled Taḥrīm al-naẓar fī kutub ahl al-kalām (The Censure of Rationalistic Theology). During this sojourn in Baghdad, Ibn Qudama studied hadith under numerous teachers, including three female hadith masters, namely Khadīja al-Nahrawāniyya (d. 1175), Nafīsa al-Bazzāza (d. 1168), and Shuhda al-Kātiba (d. ca. 1175). In turn, all these various teachers gave Ibn Qudama the permission to begin teaching the principles of hadith to his own students, including important female disciples such as Zaynab bint al-Wāsiṭī (d. ca. 1240). Ibn Qudama fought in Saladin's Army during the battle to recapture Jerusalem in 1187. He visited Baghdad again in 1189 and 1196, making his pilgrimage to Mecca the previous year in 1195, before finally settling down in Damascus in 1197, Ibn Qudama died on Saturday, the Day of Eid al-Fitr, on July 7, 1223.

== Views ==
=== God ===
In theological creed, Ibn Qudama was one of the primary proponents of the Athari school of Sunni theology, which held that overt theological speculation was spiritually detrimental and supported drawing theology exclusively from the two sources of the Quran and the hadith. Regarding theology, Ibn Qudama famously said: "We have no need to know the meaning of what God—Exalted is He—intended by His attributes—He is Great and Almighty. No deed is intended by them. No obligation is linked to them except belief in them. Belief in them is possible without knowing their meaning." According to one scholar, it is evident that Ibn Qudama "completely opposed discussion of theological matters and permitted no more than repeating what was said about God in the data of revelation." In other words, Ibn Qudama rejected "any attempt to link God’s attributes to the referential world of ordinary human language," which has led some scholars to describe Ibn Qudama's theology as "unreflective traditionalism," that is to say, as a theological point of view which purposefully avoided any type of speculation or reflection upon the nature of God. Ibn Qudama's attitude towards theology was challenged by certain later Hanbali thinkers like Ibn Taymiyyah (d. 1328), who broke with this type of "unreflective traditionalism" in order to engage "in [bold and unprecedented] interpretation[s] of the meanings of God’s attributes."

=== Heresy ===
Ibn Qudama seems to have been a formidable opponent of heresy in Islamic practice, as is evidenced by his famous words: "There is nothing outside of Paradise but hell-fire; there is nothing outside of the truth but error; there is nothing outside of the Way of the Prophet but heretical innovation."

=== Intercession ===
Ibn Qudama appears to have been a supporter of seeking the intercession of Muhammad in personal prayer, for he approvingly cites the famous prayer attributed to a hadith, cited among others by Ibn Hanbal (d. 855): "O God! I am turning to Thee with Thy Prophet, the Prophet of Mercy. O Muhammad! I am turning with you to my Lord for the fulfillment of my need." Ibn Qudama also relates that which al-’Utbiyy narrated concerning one's visitation to the grave of Muhammad in Medina:

I was sitting by the grave of the Prophet, peace and blessings be upon him, when a bedouin man [a‘rābī] entered and said, “Peace be upon you, oh Messenger of God. I have heard God say [in the Qur’an], ‘Had they come to you [the Prophet] after having done injustice to themselves [sinned] and asked God for forgiveness and [additionally had] the Messenger asked for forgiveness on their behalf, they would have found God to be oft-turning [in repentance] and merciful.’ And I have come to you seeking forgiveness for my sin[s], and seeking your intercession near God.” He [the bedouin man] then said the following poem:

O he who is the greatest of those buried in the grandest land,
[Of] those whose scent has made the valley and hills fragrant,
May my life be sacrificed for the grave that is your abode,
Where chastity, generosity and nobility reside!

Al-’Utbiyy then narrates that he fell asleep and saw the Prophet in a dream and was informed that the bedouin man had indeed been forgiven.

After quoting the above event, Ibn Qudama explicitly recommends that Muslims should use the above prayer when visiting the Prophet. He thus approves of asking the Prophet for his intercession even after his earthly death.

=== Mysticism ===
As is attested to by numerous sources, Ibn Qudama was a devoted mystic and ascetic of the Qadiriyya order of Sufism, and reserved "a special place in his heart for mystics and mysticism" for the entirety of his life. Having inherited the "spiritual mantle" (k̲h̲irqa) of Abdul-Qadir Gilani prior to the renowned spiritual master's death, Ibn Qudama was formally invested with the authority to initiate his own disciples into the Qadiriyya tariqa. Ibn Qudama later passed on the initiatic mantle to his cousin Ibrāhīm b. ʿAbd al-Wāḥid (d. 1217), another important Hanbali jurist, who became one of the primary Qadiriyya spiritual masters of the succeeding generation. According to some classical Sufi chains, another one of Ibn Qudama's major disciples was his nephew Ibn Abī ʿUmar Qudāma (d. 1283), who later bestowed the k̲h̲irqa upon Ibn Taymiyyah, who, as many recent academic studies have shown, actually appears to have been a devoted follower of the Qadiriyya Sufi order in his own right, despite his criticisms of several of the most widespread, orthodox Sufi practices of his day and, in particular, of the philosophical influence of the Akbari school of Ibn Arabi. Due to Ibn Qudama's public support for the necessity of Sufism in orthodox Islamic practice, he gained a reputation for being one of "the eminent Sufis" of his era.

=== Relics ===
Ibn Qudama supported using the relics of Muhammad for the deriving of holy blessings, as is evident from his approved citing, in al-Mug̲h̲nī 5:468, of the case of Abdullah ibn Umar (d. 693), whom he records as having placed "his hand on the seat of the Prophet's minbar ... [and] then [having proceeded to] wipe his face with it." This view was not novel or even unusual in any sense, as Ibn Qudama would have found established support for the use of relics in the Quran, hadith, and in Ibn Hanbal's well-documented love for the veneration of Muhammad's relics.

=== Saints ===
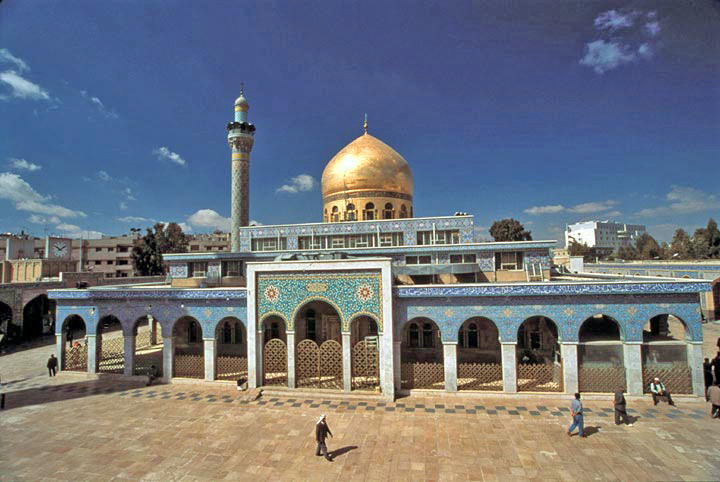
A staunch supporter of the veneration of saints, Ibn Qudama would have frequently seen the Sayyidah Zaynab Mosque in his native Damascus, where Zaynab bint Ali (d. 684) is venerated as the city's patron-saint.

Ibn Qudama staunchly criticized all who questioned or rejected the existence of saints, the veneration of whom had become an integral part of Sunni piety by the time period and which he "roundly endorsed." As scholars have noted, Hanbali authors of the period were "united in their affirmation of sainthood and saintly miracles," and Ibn Qudama was no exception. Thus, Ibn Qudama vehemently criticized what he perceived to be the rationalizing tendencies of Ibn Aqil for his attack against the veneration of saints, saying: "As for the people of the Sunna who follow the traditions and pursue the path of the righteous ancestors, no imperfection taints them, not does any disgrace occur to them. Among them are the learned who practise their knowledge, the saints and the righteous men, the God-fearing and pious, the pure and the good, those who have attained the state of sainthood and the performance of miracles, and those who worship in humility and exert themselves in the study of religious law. It is with their praise that books and registers are adorned. Their annals embellish the congregations and assemblies. Hearts become alive at the mention of their life histories, and happiness ensues from following their footsteps. They are supported by religion; and religion is by them endorsed. Of them the Quran speaks; and the Quran they themselves express. And they are a refuge to men when events afflict them: for kings, and others of lesser rank, seek their visits, regarding their supplications to God as a means of obtaining blessings, and asking them to intercede for them with God."

== Works ==
- Lumat al-Itiqad
- al-Mughnī ( The Enricher )
  The most advanced book of Ibn Qudama: Al-Mughni
- Kitāb ut-Tawwābīn
- Ithbāt Sifat il-`Uluww
- Dhamm ut-Ta'wīl
- Al-Burhān Fī Bayan Al-Qurʿān
- Al-ʿUmdah (“the support”), a beginner's guide to Ḥanbalī Fiqh. A number of commentaries have been written on this including "Sharh Al-`Umdah" of Ibn Taymiyyah.
- Al-Muqniʿ Fi Fiqh Al-Imam Ahmad Bin Hanbal Ash-Shaybānī
- " Kitāb Al-Hādī " or " Umdatul-Hazim fi-l Masail al-Zawa-id 'An Mukhtasar Abi-l Qasim "
- Al-Kaafi
- Rawḍat al-Nāẓir, a book on the Usul al-Fiqh significantly influenced by Al-Ghazali's work, Al-mustasfa.
- Al-Waşiyyah (The Advice)
- Ar-Riqqatu wal-Bukāe (sensibility and tears)
