= Al-Hasan ibn 'Ali al-Barbahari =

Iraqi Muslim theologian and religious leader (252H–329H)

Al-Ḥasan ibn ʻAlī al-Barbahārī
- الحسن بن علي البربهاري

Personal life
- Born: c. 869; 252 AH Baghdad, Abbasid Caliphate (modern-day Iraq)
- Died: 941 (aged 71–72); 329 AH Baghdad, Abbasid Caliphate
- Era: Islamic Golden Age (Middle Abbasid era)
- Main interest(s): Aqidah, Islamic Jurisprudence
- Occupation: Scholar, Theologian, Jurist

Religious life
- Religion: Islam
- Denomination: Sunni
- Jurisprudence: Hanbali
- Creed: Athari

Muslim leader
- Influenced by: Ahmad ibn Hanbal, Sahl al-Tustari
- Influenced: Ibn Battah

Al-Ḥasan ibn ʻAlī al-Barbahārī (Arabic: الحسن بن علي البربهاري) was a Hanbali Sunni Muslim theologian from Iraq. He was a scholar and jurist who played an important role in the Sunni struggle against the Shia missionaries and successfully opposed the progress of Mu'tazilism in the Abbasid Caliphate during the 10th-11th (4th-5th AH) centuries. His books are peppered with stinging remarks that place the Shias, Qadaris, and Mu'tazilis in an extremely negative light. He was responsible for a number of invasive pogroms and instances of sectarian violence in 10th-century Baghdad. Princeton University scholar of Islamic history Michael Cook has described al-Barbahari as a manifest demagogue.

== Biography ==
Al-Barbahari was born in Baghdad, Iraq, and learned from the students of Ahmad ibn Hanbal. Although al-Barbahari was an adherent of the Hanbalite school of jurisprudence, his contributions to the field were negligible.

Al-Barbahari had several widely known students, including the famed scholar Ibn Battah. His status as an authority within the Hanbali school was not universal, however, and al-Barbahari and his students were often in conflict with Abu Bakr al-Khallal, generally considered to be the sole preserver and codifier of the school. While al-Barbahari contributed little to jurisprudence, he was well known as a polemicist. His book Sharh as-Sunnah was written to educate the largely unsophisticated Hanbalites in methods to identify heretics, and advocated a fear-based system of religious worship. According to one scholar, theologian Abu al-Hasan al-Ash'ari's seminal work Ibanah was essentially a critique of the Hanbalite dogmatists in general and al-Barbahari in particular.

Al-Barbahari was notable among early Hanbalites as a defender of the practice of Taqlid, or accepting the statements of clerics without proof.

=== Sectarianism ===
Al-Barbahari was the leader of a number of violent, invasive pogroms during the Abbasid Caliphate in Baghdad due to sectarian views. His audience was strong in the Hanbalite quarter of the city. He was very influential among the urban lower classes, and exploited popular grievances to foment what often turned into mob violence against religious minorities and supposed sinners. Under the influence of al-Barbahari and popular pressure of his followers, the Caliphs al-Muqtadir and Al-Qahir enforced Hanbalism as the state creed, executing al-Barbahari's enemies and even burying renowned Muslim historian Muhammad ibn Jarir al-Tabari, considered a heretic by al-Barbahari as well as most Hanbalites at the time, in secret due to fears of mob violence were a funeral to be held at the public graveyard.

The efforts of al-Barbahari and the Baghdad Hanbalites were put to an end in 935 by the new Caliph al-Radi. Al-Barbahari had ordered mobs to break into any homes suspected of containing wine or musical instruments and organized groups of men to interrogate couples in public streets to ensure conservative conduct in public. The mobs looted shops, not all necessarily selling illegal contraband, and physically attacked female entertainers.

== See also ==
- Islamic scholars
- Notable Hanbali Scholars
