= Hanbali school =

School of Islamic jurisprudence

The Hanbali school (Note: Arabic: ٱلْمَذْهَب الْحَنْبَلِي, romanized: al-maḏhab al-ḥanbalī; pl. ٱلْمَذْهَب حَنْبَلِيّ, al-maḏhab al-ḥanbaliyy.) or Hanbalism is the smallest of the four major schools of Islamic jurisprudence within Sunni Islam. Named after and based on the teachings of Ahmad ibn Hanbal, the school belongs to the Ahl al-Hadith historical tradition.

Like the other Sunni schools, it primarily derives sharia from the Quran, hadith and views of Muhammad's companions. In cases where there is no clear answer in the sacred texts of Islam, the Hanbali school does not accept juristic discretion or customs of a community as sound bases to derive Islamic law on their own—methods that the Hanafi and Maliki schools accept. Most Hanbalis traditionally adhere to the Athari school of theology.

Hanbalis are the majority only in Saudi Arabia and Qatar, comprising barely 1% of the Sunni Muslim population worldwide. With the rise of the 18th-century conservative Wahhabi movement, the Hanbali school experienced a great reformation. The Wahhabi movement's founder, Muhammad ibn Abd al-Wahhab, collaborated with the House of Saud to spread Wahhabi teachings around the world. However, British orientalist Michael Cook argues that Ahmad ibn Hanbal's own beliefs played "no real part in the establishment of the central doctrines of Wahhabism", and that "the older Hanbalite authorities had doctrinal concerns very different from those of the Wahhabis". Wahhabi scholars such as al-Albani, Muqbil al-Wadi'i and Ibn Baz eventually began to criticize taqlid to any of the four schools, including the Hanbali school.

== History ==
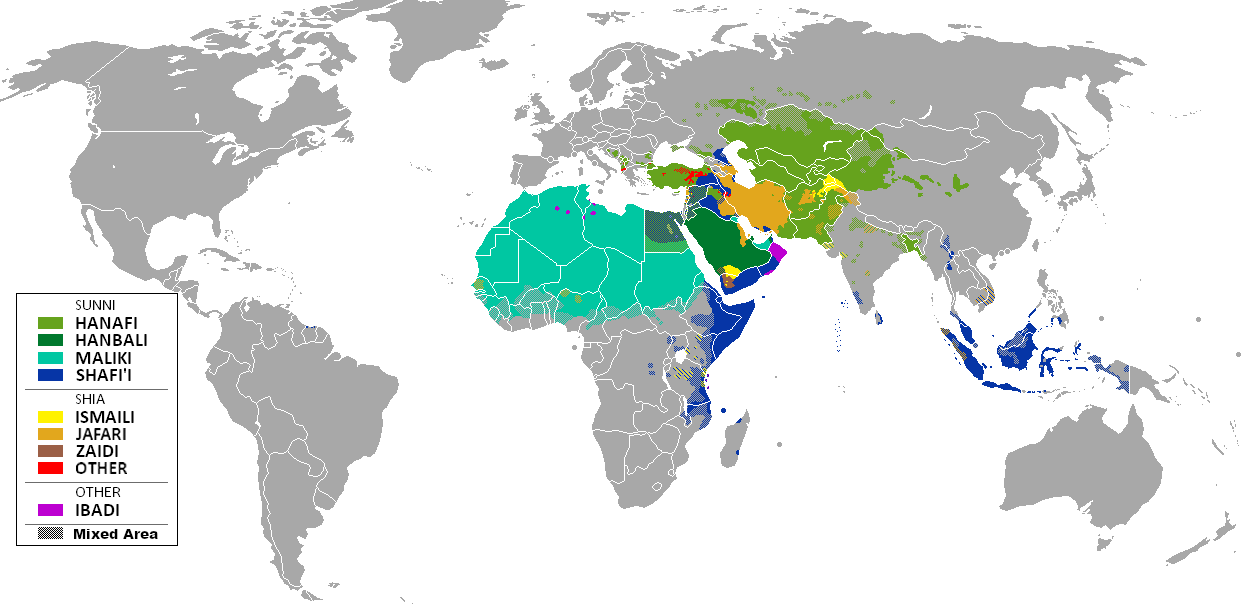
Map of the Muslim world.

Ahmad ibn Hanbal, the founder of Hanbali school of thought (madhhab), was a disciple of the Sunni Imam Al-Shafi‘i, who was reportedly a student of Imam Malik ibn Anas, who was a student of the Imam Ja'far al-Sadiq, like Imam Abu Hanifa. Thus all of the four great Imams of Sunni Fiqh are connected to Imam Ja'far al-Sadiq from the Bayt (Household) of Muhammad, whether directly or indirectly.

Like Al-Shafi'i and Dawud al-Zahiri, Ahmad was deeply concerned with the extreme elasticity being deployed by many jurists of his time, who used their discretion to reinterpret the doctrines of Qur'an and Hadiths to suit the demands of Caliphs and the wealthy. Ibn Hanbal advocated for a literal interpretation of Qur'an and Hadiths. Influenced by the debates of his time, he was known for rejecting religious rulings (fatwas) from the 'Ijma (consensus) of jurists of his time, which he considered to be speculative theology (Kalam). He associated them with the Mu'tazilis, whom he despised and referred to as heretical apostates. When asked whether or not people should pray behind them in congregation, he said "One does not pray behind them, such as the Jahmiyyah and the Mu’tazilah." Ibn Hanbal was also hostile to the discretionary principles of rulings in jurisprudence (Usul al-fiqh) mainly championed by the people of opinion, which was established by Abu Hanifa, although he did adopt al-Shafi'i's method in usul al-fiqh. He linked these discretionary principles with kalam. His guiding principle was that the Quran and Sunnah are the only proper sources of Islamic jurisprudence, and are of equal authority and should be interpreted literally in line with the Athari creed. He also believed that there can be no true consensus (Ijma) among jurists (mujtahids) of his time, and preferred the consensus of Muhammad's companions (Sahaba) and weaker hadiths. Imam Hanbal himself compiled Al-Musnad, a text with over 30,000 sayings, actions and customs of Muhammad.

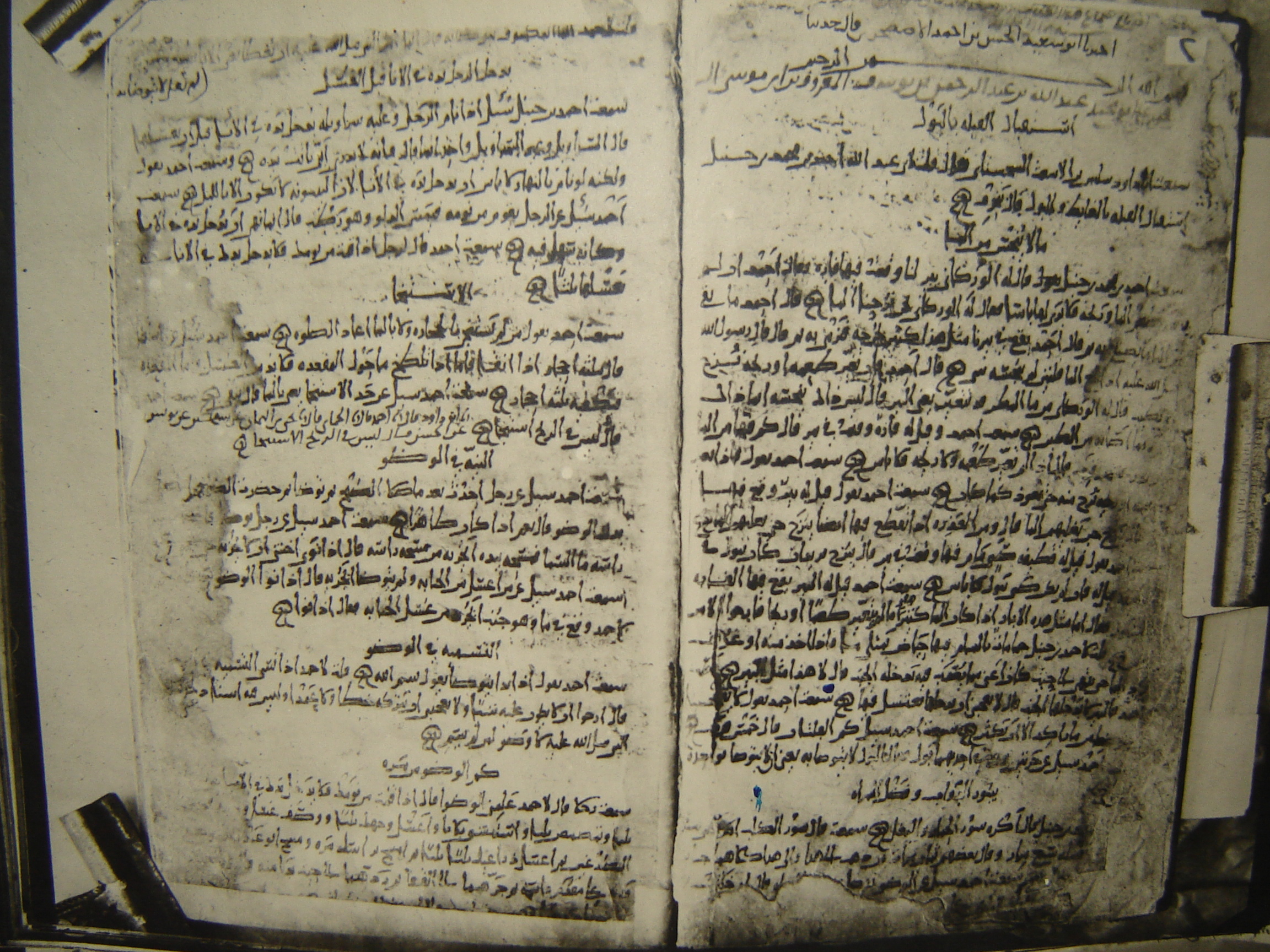
Legal questions of Abu Dawud al-Sijistani addressed to Ibn Hanbal, produced October 879

Ibn Hanbal never composed an actual systematic legal theory on his own, and was against setting up juristic superstructures. He devoted himself to the task of collection and study of Hadith; and believed that legal rulings must be derived by referring directly to the Qur'an and Sunnah; instead of referring to a body of religious jurisprudence. However; his followers would later establish a systematic legal methodology some generations after Ibn Hanbal's death. Much of the work of preserving the school based on Ibn Hanbal's method was laid by his student Abu Bakr al-Khallal; his documentation on the founder's views eventually reached twenty volumes. The original copy of the work, which was contained in the House of Wisdom, was burned along with many other works of literature during the Mongol siege of Baghdad. The book was only preserved in a summarized form by the Hanbali jurist al-Khiraqi, who had access to written copies of al-Khallal's book before the siege.

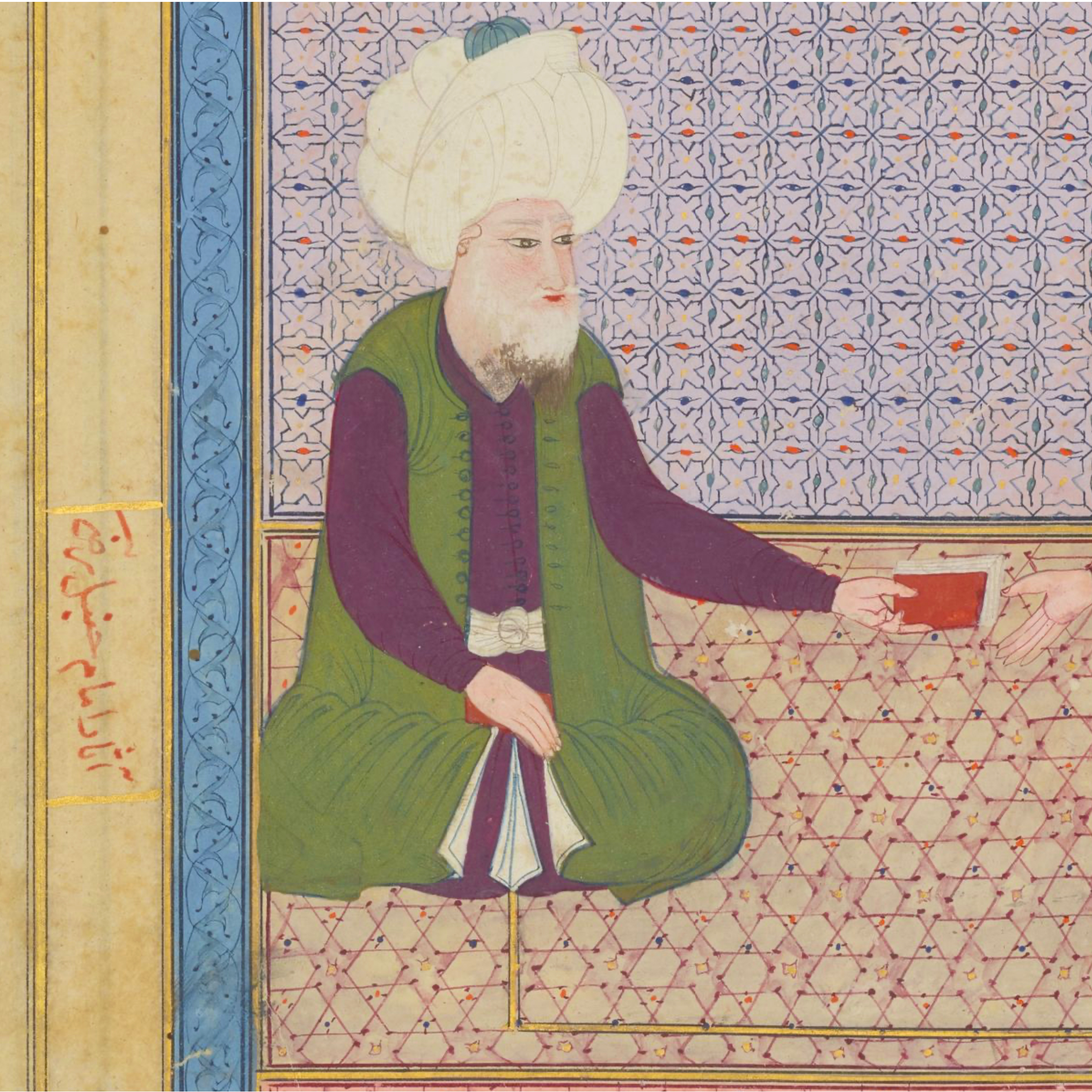
Miniature in a 1585-1590 Ottoman manuscript depicting Ahmad ibn Hanbal

Relations with the Abbasid Caliphate were rocky for the Hanbalites. Led by the Hanbalite scholar Al-Hasan ibn 'Ali al-Barbahari, the school often formed mobs of followers in 10th-century Baghdad who would engage in violence against fellow Sunnis suspected of committing sins and the Shias. During al-Barbahari's leadership of the school in Baghdad, shops were looted, female entertainers were attacked in the streets, popular grievances among the lower classes were agitated as a source of mobilization, and public chaos in general ensued. Their efforts would be their own undoing in 935, when a series of home invasions and mob violence on the part of al-Barbahari's followers in addition to perceived deviant views led to the Caliph Ar-Radi publicly condemning the school in its entirety and ending its official patronage by state religious bodies.

According to Christopher Melchert, medieval Hanbali literature is rich in references to saints, grave visitation, miracles, and relics. Historically, the Hanbali school has been seen as one of the four major Sunni madhahib (schools of law), and many prominent medieval Sufis, such as Abdul Qadir Gilani, were Hanbali jurists and mystics at the same time.

At some point between the 10th and 12th centuries, some Hanbali scholars began adopting the term “Salafi". The influential 13th century Hanbali theologian Ibn Taymiyya advocated Salafi thought as a theological endeavour and his efforts would create a lasting impact on the subsequent followers of the Hanbali school.

== Demographics ==
Hanbali school is the smallest out of the four schools. It is the majority only in Saudi Arabia and Qatar where the Wahhabi movement has grown. However, Qatar has a sizeable Shafi'i minority with the most well-known Qatari scholar Ali al-Qaradaghi belonging to the Shafi'i school. Hanbalis form barely 2% of the global Muslim population.

== Principles ==
=== Sources of law ===
Like all other schools of Sunni Islam, the Hanbali school holds that the two primary sources of Islamic law are the Qur'an and the Sunnah found in Hadiths (compilation of sayings, actions and customs of Muhammad). Where these texts did not provide guidance, Imam Hanbal recommended guidance from established consensus of Muhammad's companions (Sahabah), then individual opinion of Muhammad's companions, followed in order of preference by weaker hadiths, and in rare cases analogy (Qiyas). The Hanbali school, unlike Hanafi and Maliki schools, rejected that a source of Islamic law can be a jurist's personal discretionary opinion or consensus of later generation Muslims on matters that serve the interest of Islam and community. Hanbalis hold that this is impossible and leads to abuse.

Ibn Hanbal rejected the possibility of religiously binding consensus (Ijma), as it was impossible to verify once later generations of Muslims spread throughout the world, going as far as declaring anyone who claimed as such to be a liar. Ibn Hanbal did, however, accept the possibility and validity of the consensus of the Sahaba the first generation of Muslims. Later followers of the school, however, expanded on the types of consensus accepted as valid, and the prominent Hanbalite Ibn Taymiyya expanded legal consensus to later generations while at the same time restricting it only to the religiously learned. Analogical reasoning (Qiyas), was likewise rejected as a valid source of law by Ibn Hanbal himself, with a near-unanimous majority of later Hanbalite jurists not only accepting analogical reasoning as valid but also borrowing from the works of Shafi'ite jurists on the subject.

Ibn Hanbal's strict standards of acceptance regarding the sources of Islamic law were probably due to his suspicion regarding the field of Usul al-Fiqh, which he equated with speculative theology (kalam). While demanding strict application of Qur'an and Hadith, Hanbali Fiqh is nonetheless flexible in areas not covered by Scriptures. In issues where the Qur'an and the Hadiths were ambiguous or vague; the Hanbali Fuqaha (jurists) engaged in Ijtihad to derive rulings. Additionally, the Hanbali madh'hab accepted the Islamic principle of Maslaha ('public interest') in solving the novel issues. In the modern era, Hanbalites have branched out and even delved into matters regarding the upholding (Istislah) of public interest (Maslaha) and even juristic preference (Istihsan), anathema to the earlier Hanbalites as valid methods of determining religious law.

=== Theology ===
Ibn Hanbal taught that the Qur'an is uncreated due to Muslim belief that it is the word of God, and the word of God is not created. The Muʿtazilites taught that the Qur'an, which is readable and touchable, is created like other creatures and created objects. Ibn Hanbal viewed this as heresy, replying that there are things which are not touchable but are created, such as the Throne of God. Unlike the other three schools of Islamic jurisprudence (Hanafi, Maliki, and Shafi), the Hanbali madhab remained largely traditionalist or Athari in theology and it was primarily Hanbali scholars who codified the Athari school of thought.

== Distinct rulings ==
=== Purity (tahara) ===
==== Ablution (wudu) ====
- Saying "with the name of God" (bi-smi llāh) is necessary, but waived if one forgets or is ignorant.
- It is obligatory and a pillar (rukn) to wash the mouth and nose, and is not waived.
- It is obligatory and a pillar to wipe the entire head, including the ears, and is not waived. Wiping the neck is not recommended.
- It is recommended to lengthen the whiteness that will appear on the Day of Judgement by washing to the top of the arms and shins.
- Impurities, such as blood, pus, and vomit, nullify ablution if they come out the body in large amounts, but not small amounts. If they come out the front or back private parts, it nullifies it regardless of the amount. Also, urine and stool nullify it regardless of the amount and where it came out from.
- Light sleep when standing or sitting does not nullify ablution.
- Touching someone of the opposite sex with any part of the body nullifies ablution if done with lust (shahwah). The hair, teeth, and nails are not included.
- Touching the front or back private part with the hand nullifies ablution. The testicles are not included.
- Wind passing from the woman's front private part nullifies ablution.
- Eating camel meat nullifies ablution, whether raw or cooked. All other parts, such as its fat, liver, or pancreas, do not.
- Washing the dead nullifies ablution.
- Apostasy nullifies ablution.

==== Impurities (najasa) ====
- A minimum of three wipes is obligatory to cleanse the impurity after relieving oneself, and any less will not suffice. If there is still impurity after that, more wipes must be used until the effect is achieved. Microscopic amounts are excused.
- Washing the hands three times is obligatory after awakening from a night's sleep. Naps during the day are not included.
- Impurities must be washed seven times with water to be rendered pure. Nothing can cleanse impurities except purifying (ṭahūr) water.
- Transforming one substance into another does not render it pure, even if it changes its chemical properties, except alcohol (khamr).
- If an impurity falls into pure (ṭāhir) water less than two qullahs in volume, all of it is rendered impure (najis). If it is more than two qullahs, it remains pure. If the liquid the impurity falls into is other than water, it will be rendered impure regardless of the amount.
- Semen (madī) is pure.
- Blood, pus, vomit, pre-ejaculate fluid (madhī), and white discharge after urinating (wadī) are impure. However, a small amount of blood and pus is excused.
- Cat hair and saliva are pure.
- All seafood is generally pure and permissible.
- Pigs, dogs, donkeys, predators larger than a cat, birds with talons, and all animals derived from them are all impure and impermissible.
- Leather from unslaughtered animals is impure, even if tanned.
- Rennet from unslaughtered animals is impure and impermissible.
- Vinegar made with human intervention is impure and impermissible, but pure and permissible if formed naturally.

=== Prayer (salah) ===
==== Standing (qiyam) ====
- It is recommended to grasp (qabd) the hands below the navel, as stated in Kashshaf al-Qina by Mansur al-Buhuti, al-Mughni of Ibn Qudamah, and other works. This is also the position of the Hanafi school, as well as Abu Hanifa and his students, Sufyan ath-Thawri, Ishaq ibn Rahuyah, Ibrahim an-Nakha'i, and other scholars among the predecessors (salaf).

Other views on where to place them do exist in the school, due to conflicting narrations from Ahmad:

1. Above the navel and below the chest
2. On the navel
3. A choice wherever to place them
4. Letting them hang free (ṣadl)
5. Grasping them in obligatory prayers, but letting them hang free in voluntary prayers
- Reciting another chapter (sūrah) after reciting the chapter al-Fatihah is recommended and not obligatory.
- It is recommended to look at the place of prostration when standing and throughout the entire prayer, except the testimony.

==== Bowing (ruku) ====
- It is recommended to raise the hands (rafʿ al-yadayn) when going into bowing and rising from it.
- It is obligatory to recite the remembrance, "Glory be to my Lord, the Most Great" (subḥāna rabbiya l-ʿaẓīm), once, and recommended to do so three or more times.
- When standing after bowing, it is obligatory to recite the remembrance, "Our Lord, to you is all praise" (rabbanā laka l-ḥamd). One has a choice whether to grasp the hands like before or not.

==== Prostration (sujud) ====
- The fingers should be closed together and facing the direction of prayer (qiblah), including the thumb, and the tips should be align with the top of the shoulders.
- It is obligatory to recite the remembrance, "Glory be to my Lord, the Most High" (subḥāba rabbiya l-aʿlā), once, and recommended to do so three or more times.

==== Sitting (jalsa) ====
- It is obligatory to recite the supplication, "Lord, forgive me" (rabbi ghfir lī) once, and recommended to do so three or more times.

==== Testimony of faith (tashahhud) ====
- The little and ring fingers of the right hand should be folded in, a circle should be made with the middle finger and thumb, and the index finger should be pointed when saying the name of God (Allāh).
- It is recommended to look at the finger.
- It is permissible to raise the hands when rising.
- Peace and salutations upon Muhammad and extra supplications are only done in the sitting of the final testimony.
- It is recommended to sit in the outstretched (at-tawarruk) position in the sitting of the final testimony when the prayer has more than one.

==== Greeting of peace (taslim) ====
- Two are obligatory and pillars which are not waived. The exact wording must be used: "All peace be on you and the mercy of God" (as-salāmu ʿalaykum wa-raḥmatu llāh). It is not permissible to omit a single letter, not even the definite article al-, or to replace alaykum with alayk.

==== Voluntary prayers ====
===== Odd prayer (salah al-witr) =====
- It is recommended to pray two cycles (rakʿatayn) consecutively, and then separately. It is recommended to recite the special supplication (qunūt) after bowing, while raising the hands. However, other ways to perform it are permissible.
- After reciting the special supplication, it is recommended to raise the hands when going into prostration.

==== Congregational prayer ====
- In the absence of a valid excuse, it is obligatory for adult men to pray in congregation rather than individually.

=== Other ===
- Most Hanbali scholars consider admission in a court of law to be indivisible, that is, a plaintiff may not accept some parts of a defendant's testimony while rejecting other parts. This position is also held by the Zahiri school, though opposed by the Hanafi and Maliki schools.

== Reception ==
The Hanbali school has traditionally enjoyed a smaller following than the other schools. In the earlier period, Sunni jurisprudence was based on four other schools: Hanafi, Maliki, Shafi'i and Zahiri; later on, the Hanbali school supplanted the Zahiri school's spot as the fourth mainstream school. Hanbalism essentially formed as a traditionalist reaction to what they viewed as bid'ah (innovations) on the part of the earlier established schools.

Historically, the school's legitimacy was not always accepted. Muslim exegete Muhammad ibn Jarir al-Tabari, founder of the now extinct Jariri school of law, was noted for ignoring the Hanbali school entirely when weighing the views of jurists; this was due to his view that the founder, Ibn Hanbal, was merely a scholar of Hadith (prophetic traditions) and was not a Faqih (jurist) at all. The Hanbalites, led by al-Barbahari, reacted by stoning Tabari's home several times, inciting riots so violent that Abbasid authorities had to subdue them by force. Upon Tabari's death, the Hanbalites formed a violent mob large enough that Abbasid officials buried him in secret, in an attempt to prevent further riots. Similarly, the Andalusian Malikite Jurist and theologian Ibn 'Abd al-Barr made a point to exclude Ibn Hanbal's views from the books on Sunni Muslim jurisprudence.

Eventually, the Mamluk Sultanate and later the Ottoman Empire codified Sunni Islam as four schools, including the Hanbalite school at the expense of the Zahirites. The Hanafis, Shafi'is and Malikis agreed on important matters and recognized each other's systems as equally valid; this was not the case with the Hanbalites, who were recognized as legitimate by the older three schools but refused to return the favor.

== Differences with other Sunni schools ==
By the end of the classical era, the other three remaining schools had codified their laws into comprehensive jurisprudential systems; enforcing them far and wide. However, the Hanbalis stood apart from the other three madh'habs; by insisting on referring directly back to the Qur’an and Sunnah, to arrive at legal rulings. They also opposed the codification of sharia (Islamic law) into a comprehensive system of jurisprudence; considering the Qur'an and Hadith to be the paramount sources.

== Relationship with Sufism ==
Sufism, often described as the inner mystical dimension of Islam, is not a separate "school" or "sect" of the religion, but, rather, is considered by its adherents to be an "inward" way of approaching Islam which complements the regular outward practice of the five pillars; Sufism became immensely popular during the medieval period in practically all parts of the Sunni world and continues to remain so in many parts of the world today. As Christopher Melchert has pointed out, both Hanbalism and classical Sufism took concrete shapes in the ninth and early tenth-centuries CE, with both soon becoming "essential components of the high-medieval Sunni synthesis." The Hanbali school of Sunni law historically had a very intimate relationship with Sufism throughout Islamic history.

There is evidence that many early medieval Hanbali scholars were very close to the Sufi martyr and saint Hallaj, whose mystical piety seems to have influenced many regular jurists in the school. This is likely due to Al-Hallaj himself being a fanatical follower of Hanbali school with reports saying he would pray 500 time a day outside the tomb of Ahmed Bin Hanbal. Hallaj was also saved by many Hanbalis during the multiple times he was arrested in Baghdad prior to his execution. Tustari was also known to be a Hanbali and was the Sufi teacher of the Hanbali polemicist al-Barbahari. Many later Hanbalis, meanwhile, were often Sufis themselves, including figures not normally associated with Sufism, such as Ibn Taymiyyah and Ibn Qayyim al-Jawziyyah. Both these men, sometimes considered to be completely anti-Sufi in their leanings, were actually initiated into the Qadiriyya order of the celebrated mystic and saint Abdul Qadir Gilani, who was himself a renowned Hanbali Faqih. As the Qadiriyya Tariqah is often considered to be the largest and most widespread Sufi order in the world, with many branches spanning from Turkey to Pakistan, one of the largest Sufi branches is effectively founded on Hanbali school. Other prominent Hanbalite scholars who praised Sufism include Ibn 'Aqil, Ibn Qudamah, Ibn Rajab al-Hanbali, Muhammad Ibn Abd al-Wahhab.

Although Muhammad Ibn Abd al-Wahhab is sometimes regarded as a denier of Sufism, both he and his early disciples acclaimed Tasawwuf; believing it to be an important discipline in Islamic religion. Ibn 'Abd al-Wahhab prescribed various Sufi spiritual exercises to his followers for attaining Zuhd (asceticism), in accordance with Qur'an and Hadith. Extolling the virtuous Sufi Awliya (saints) who attained Ma'rifa (highest stage of mystical awareness in Sufism) as exemplars to his followers, Ibn 'Abd al-Wahhab stated:

" “From among the wonders is to find a Sufi who is a faqih and a scholar who is an ascetic (zahid).” For indeed those who are concerned with the piety of the heart are often associated with a lack of ma‘rifah, which would necessitate abstinence from wrong and make jihad necessary. And those who are in-depth in knowledge at times mention such wickedness and doubts that place them in err and deviation... So, His love itself is the basis of His worship, and assigning equals (shirk) in love is the basis of polytheism in His worship... This is why the ‘arif Sufi shaykhs would advise many to pursue knowledge. Some of them would say: “A person only leaves a single Sunnah due to the pride in him.” "

== List of Hanbali scholars ==
- Abu Ishaq Ibrahim ibn Ya'qub ibn Ishaq al-Sa'di al-Juzajani (Arabic: أبو إسحاق إبراهيم بن يعقوب بن إسحاق السعدي الجوزجاني, born around 796 CE/180 AH – died 872 CE/259 AH) was a Muslim hadith scholar, one of the imams of al-jarh wa al-ta'deel and a student of Ahmad ibn Hanbal. Some of the hadith scholars who transmitted his narrations include Abu Dawood, al-Tirmidhi and al-Nasa'i.
- Abu Dawud al-Sijistani - was a scholar of prophetic hadith who compiled the third of the six "canonical" hadith collections recognized by Sunni Muslims, the Sunan Abu Dāwūd.
- Abu Bakr al-Khallal (d. 311 AH) – Jurist responsible for the school's early codification.
- Sahl al-Tustari (d. 283 AH), a Persian scholar and ascetic from Shushtar in Iran.
- Al-Hasan ibn 'Ali al-Barbahari (d. 329 A.H.), an Iraqi traditionist and a jurist, author of the book Sharh al-Sunnah.
- Abu al-Hasan 'Abd al-'Aziz b. al-Harith b. Asad b. al-Layth al-Tamimi (929–981/2 CE; 317–371 AH) (Arabic: أبو الحسن عبد العزيز بن الحارث بن أسد بن الليث التميمي) was a Muslim saint who belonged to the Junaidia order.
- Abū al-Faḍl al-Tamīmi (952–1020 CE/341–410 AH) Abd al-Wāḥid b. ʿAbd al-ʿAzīz b. al-Ḥārith b. Asad al-Tamīmī or Abū al-Faḍl al-Tamīmī (Arabic: أبو الفضل التميمي) was a 10th-century Muslim saint who belonged to the Junaidia order.
- Abd al-Ghani ibn Abd al-Wahid al-Maqdisi (Arabic: عبد الغني بن عبد الوحيد المقدسي, romanized: ʿAbd al-Ghāni ibn ʿAbd al-Waḥīd al-Maqdisī; 1146 – 1203) was a classical Sunni Islamic scholar and a prominent hadith master.
- Abū 'Alī al-Ḥasan ibn Aḥmad ibn 'Abd Allāh ibn al-Bannā' al-Baghdādī al-Ḥanbalī
- Abū Ismāʿīl al-Harawī (d. 397–398 A.H.), an Iranian scholar from Herat, Afghanistan.
- Ibn Battah al-Ukbari (d. 387 A.H.), an Iraqi theologian and jurisconsult, author of the book Al-Ibaanah.
- Abū al-Qāsim ʿUmar ibn al-Ḥusayn al-Khiraqī al-Baghdadi (c. 911 – 945/46) was a prominent Sunni jurist of Hanbali school.
- Abū 'Abdullāh Muhammad Ibn Manda (d. 395 A.H.), hadīth master, biographer and historian from Isfahan.
- Al-Qadi Abu Ya'la (d. 458 A.H.)
- Ibn Aqil (d. 513 A.H.)
- Awn al-Din ibn Hubayra (d. 560 A.H.)
- Abdul Qadir Gilani (d. 561 A.H.) a Persian scholar, jurist and Sufi master from Gilan province in Iran.
- Abu-al-Faraj Ibn Al-Jawzi (d. 597 A.H.) – A famous jurist, exegete, critic, preacher and a prolific author, with works on nearly all subjects.
- Hammad al-Harrani (d. 598A.H.) – A jurist, critic and preacher who lived in Alexandria under the reign of Salahudin.
- Abd al-Ghani al-Maqdisi (d. 600 A.H.) – A prominent hadith master from Damascus and the nephew of Ibn Qudamah.
- Ibn Qudama (d. 620A.H.) – One of the major Hanbali authorities and the author of the profound and voluminous book on Law, al-Mughni, which became popular amongst researchers from all juristic backgrounds.
- Diya al-Din al-Maqdisi (d. 643 A.H.)
- Ibn Hamdan, Ahmad al-Harrani (d. 695 A.H.) - A jurist and judge born and raised in Harran and later practised in Cairo.
- Ibn Muflih al Maqdisi (d. 763 A.H.)
- Taqi al-Din ibn Taymiyya (d. 728 AH), a well-known Syrian theologian, jurist and scholar.
- Ibn al-Qayyim (d. 751 A.H.) – The closest companion and student of Ibn Taymiyya, also a respected jurist in his own right.
- Ibn Rajab (d. 795 A.H.) – A prominent jurist, traditionist, ascetic and preacher, who authored several important works, largely commenting upon famous collections of traditions.
- Ibn al-Mibrād (d. 909 A.H.) - a Syrian jurist who specialized in ʾUṣūl al-Fiqh and wrote an intermediate treatise on it, Ghāyat al-sūl ilā ʿilm al-uṣūl. This work is considered to be his magnum opus and is a widely recognized work by later Hanbali scholars.
- Mar'ī al-Karmī (d. 1033 A.H.) - The main jurist of Hanbali Madhhab of his time in Al-Azhar University, Egypt and authority from the later generation of Hanbali Scholars. He was a scholar, the most knowledgeable person, a researcher, an interpreter of the Qur’an, a narrator of Hadith, an Islamic jurist, al-Usuli, a grammarian and one of the most prominent Hanbalis in Egypt.
- Shams al-Din al-Saffarini (d.1701- 1774)
- al-Buhūtī (d. 1051 A.H.) - The leading jurist of Hanabilah of his time in Egypt and authority from the later generation of Hanbali Scholars.
- Muhammad ibn Abd-al-Wahhab – A Hanbalī jurist and traditionalist. He is the patronym of the Wahhabi movement.
- Muhammad Jamil ash-Shatti (1882–1958) – A Hanbali scholar and leading authority of the Hanbalis in Damascus.

== See also ==
- Outline of Islam
- Adhan
- Islamic schools and branches
- Islamic views on sin
- Salat
- The four Sunni Imams
- Wudu
