= Islam and magic =

Divination, magic, and occultism in Islam

Belief and practice in magic in Islam is "widespread and pervasive" and a "vital element of everyday life and practice", both historically and currently in Islamic culture. Magic range from talisman inscribed with Divine names of God, Quranic verses, and Arabic letters, and divination, to the performance of miracles and sorcery. Most Muslims also believe in a form of divine blessing called barakah. Popular forms of talisman include the construction of Magic squares and Talismanic shirts, believed to invoke divine favor by inscribing God's names. While miracles, considered to be a gift from God, are approved, the practise of black magic (siḥr) is prohibited. Other forms of magic intersect with what might be perceived as science, such as the prediction of the course of the planets or weather.

Licit forms of magic call upon God, the angels, prophets, jinn, and saints, while illicit magic is believed to call upon evil jinn and demons. Magic, with the purpose to heal, is permissible and used by means of shielding against the evil eye, sickness, jinn, and demons. The prohibition of magic lies in its alleged effect to cause harm, such as bestowing curses, summoning evil spirits, and causing illnesses. In the past, some Muslim scholars have rejected that magic has any real impact. However, they disapproved of sorcery nonetheless, as it is a means of deceiving people. Despite the disapproval of (black) magic, there has been no notable violence against people accused of practicing magic in the pre-modern period. However, in the modern period, various Islamic movements have shown a more hostile attitude to what is perceived as practise of magic.

== Quran ==
Sixty-six Quranic verses reportedly relate to the subject of magic. Surah 2:102 and many other verses describe magic in a negative light. Its practices are secrets that the humans "ought not to have known"; devils/fallen angels teach it; its practitioners will end up in hell; other verses condemn it as a pagan practice. But the Quran does not forbid magic or prescribe punishment for its practice. In Verse Q.10:2 Muhammad is falsely accused of being a magician by his opponents ('Yet the disbelievers said, "Indeed, this ˹man˺ is clearly a magician!"'). Not all verses make negative references to supernatural powers or those that use them. Surah al-Isra suggests that the Quran itself bestows barakah (magical blessings) upon hearers and heals them. In An-Naml (Surah 27), Solomon is described as having the power to speak with animals and jinn, and command birds and devils.

Aside from what the text of the Quran says about magic, it is thought to have supernatural properties and is used as a source of supernatural protection and healing.

Surah Al-Falaq (Surah 113) is used as a prayer to God to ward off black magic, and according to hadith-literature, was revealed to Muhammad to protect him against Jann, the ancestor of the jinn. Surahs Al-Fatiha (Surah 1) and An-Nas (Surah 114) are also thought to have the ability to generate barakah. There are also individual verses claimed to have power (such as the healing verses 9:15, 19:57, 16:69, 26:80, 41:44).

== Talismanic magic ==
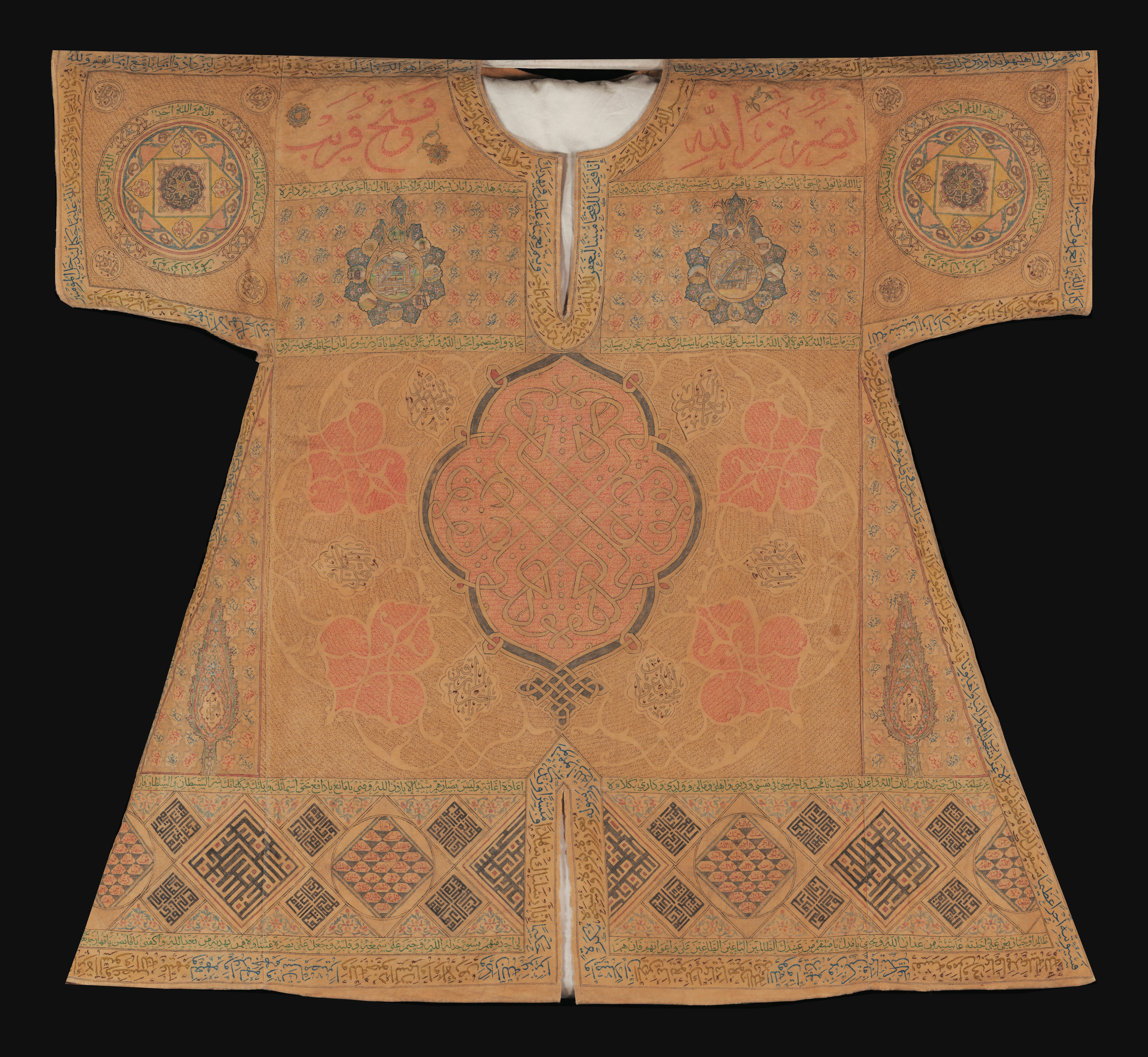
Talismanic shirt inscribed with Qur'anic verses, the Asma' al-Husna, and prayers, with views of Mecca and Medina; 17th century Turkey, Khalili Collection of Hajj and the Arts of Pilgrimage

The use of symbols, letters, and numbers for magical purpose are deeply embedded in Islamic tradition. They are not only used for means of protection against the evil eye, misfortune, jinn, and demons, but also to bring good fortune, increase fertility, therapeutic means, and to preserve attractiveness. Talisman (or amulets), inscribed with mystical symbols, often contain one of God's 99 names, the names of angels, or prophets. While virtually all Muslim scholars permit the use of talisman evoking God or one of His intercessors (Muhammad, Ali, saints, etc.), it is prohibited to address jinn or demons. As such, talisman magic differs from European charms, which usually address minor deities or demons rather than God. Islamic talisman usually contain Quranic verses, pious phrases, or invocations, and function, as has been described, "a supercharged prayer".

Until the ninth century, talisman often reflect pre-Islamic artistry. For still unknown reasons, beginning with the 12th century, pre-Islamic designs drop out in favor of other symbolic designs, such as a pentagram, the Seal of Solomon, zodiacal signs. However, most prominent at that time were magical squares (wafq). The earliest magical squares were 3x3 squares in which the numerals from 1 through 9 were arranged in a way that all numbers, horizontally, vertically, and diagonally, were arranged in a way that the sum equals 15. This square in particular gained great popularity and was often associated with the four Islamic archangels. 6x6 squares are attested as early as the late 10th century, however, they did not enter magical vocabulary until the 13th century. Magical symbols are also engraved in shirts, known as talismanic shirts, painted with symbols of the Quran. The only preserved today are from the 15th century.

== Black magic (Siḥr) ==
The word usually translated as "magic" in the Quran is siḥr. (Note: The root sin-ha-ra Arabic: سحر appears 20 times in the Quran (found with a search of "magic" in English in Dr. Mustafa Khattab, the Clear Quran)) According to Adam Silverstein, the "Arabic word for 'magic' is siḥr, ... in the Qur'an Siḥr means ... 'black magic,' but in modern Arabic the same word is used for 'entertaining magic'". The Hans Wehr Dictionary of Modern Written Arabic defines siḥr as "bewitchment, beguilement, enchantment, fascination"; and the plural form (ashar) as "sorcery, witchcraft, magic". Emilie Savage-Smith gives a very broad definition including "anything wondrous, including elegant and subtle poetry, ... sleight-of-hand tricks, ... the healing properties of plants, ... invocations to God for assistance, ... invocations to jinn or demons or the spirits of the planets, and on occasion even to the divinatory art of astrology."

Toufic Fahd in the Brill Encyclopedia of Islam usually uses "magic as the translation of sihr", but "occasionally uses sorcery or witchcraft". Fahd himself first defines sihr as that which leads its subject to "believe that what he sees is real when it is not", but also includes "everything that is known as 'white' or 'natural magic'". According to Fahd, magic (siḥr) is part of ʿUlūm al-Ghayb, "the occult sciences"; Theurgy (ʿilm al-khawāṣṣ wa ṭ-ṭalāsim), which Radcliff Edmonds describes as the practice of rituals to invoke action or the divine presence, especially to achieve henosis (unity with the divine) and perfecting oneself); White or natural magic (ʿilm al-ḥiyal wa-ash-shaʾwadhah); and Black magic or sorcery (ʿilm as-siḥr).

Michael Dols note that siḥr is mostly referring to sorcery evoking demons, and thus forbidden. In his examination of about sihr in contemporary Islamic society is that it refers to prohibited (haram) magic. Remke Kruk defines the practice of siḥr as magic or sorcery, and translates material objects called siḥr as "charms".

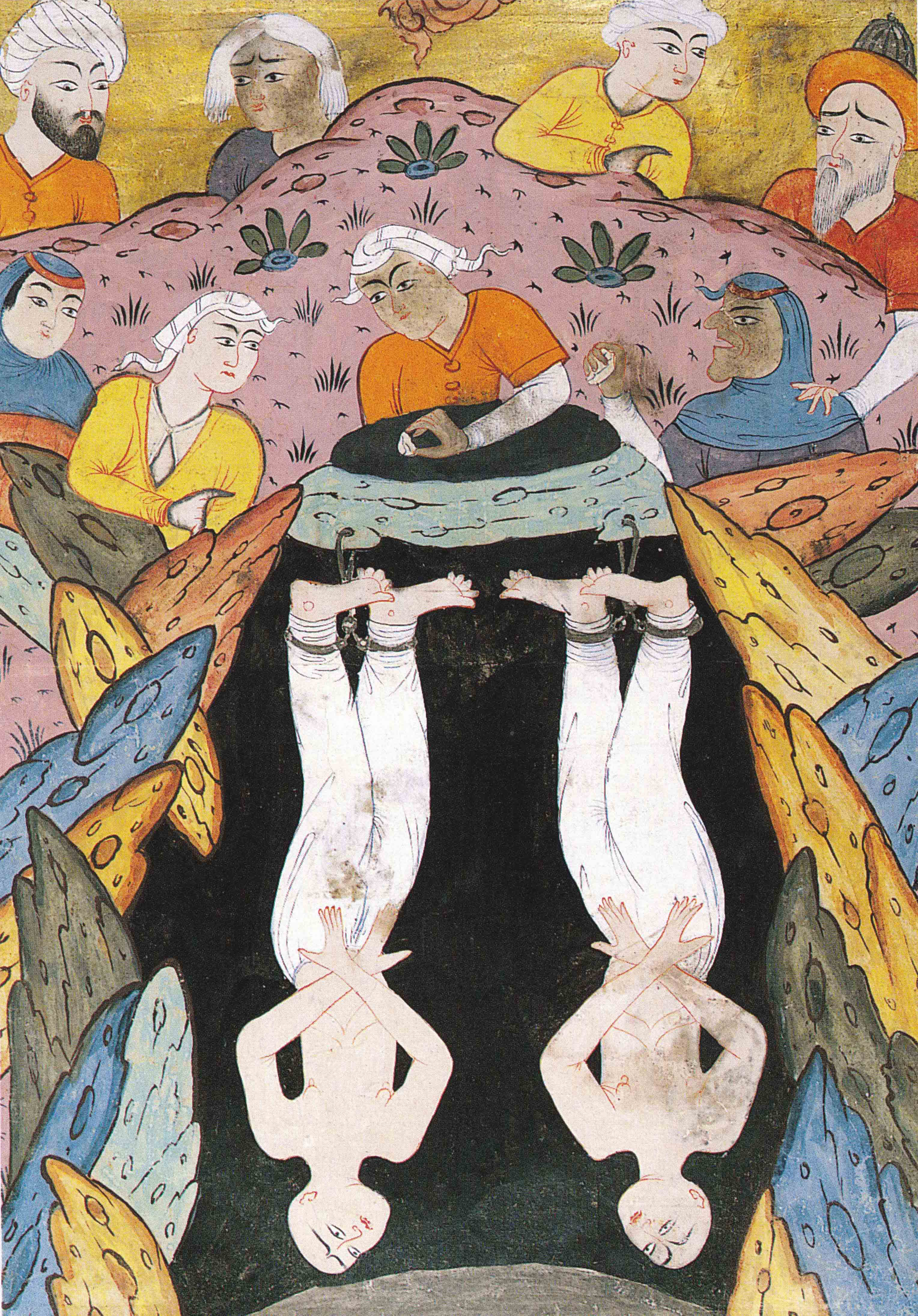
Harut and Marut in Their Forever Well (1703)

The Quran provides overall the following picture: When God (Allah) creates Adam, God orders the angels to bow down before the new creature. Those of the followers of Iblis, who opposed the creation of Adam, refused and whereupon became devils; tempters and testers for humanity in order to obstruct them from gaining Divine favor. According to 2:102 siḥr is then taught by the fallen angels Hārūt and Mārūt:

They ˹instead˺ followed the magic promoted by the devils during the reign of Solomon. Never did Solomon disbelieve, rather the devils disbelieved. They taught magic to the people, along with what had been revealed to the two angels, Hârût and Mârût, in Babylon. The two angels never taught anyone without saying, "We are only a test ˹for you˺, so do not abandon ˹your˺ faith." Yet people learned ˹magic˺ that caused a rift ˹even˺ between husband and wife; although their magic could not harm anyone except by Allah's Will. They learned what harmed them and did not benefit them—although they already knew that whoever buys into magic would have no share in the Hereafter. Miserable indeed was the price for which they sold their souls, if only they knew!

The description of black magic (siḥr) in the Quran as revealed by the fallen angels/devils suggests it is (in the words of Toufic Fahd), a "fragment of a celestial knowledge ..." and not forming a separate party among the Jahiliyyah (pagan Arabs). Based on the verse, Irmeli Perho describes magic as "part of God's creation, like good deeds and bad deeds; like belief and unbelief". Since the magicians "evil actions will only take place if God allows it", magic is accommodated in the Islamic doctrine of "an omnipotent God".

In hadith, siḥr develops into a more hostile concept. In an examination of hadith on magic and witchcraft, Irmeli Perho writes that "magic is seen as a power distinct from God, whereas in the Qurʾān magic is a power that is ultimately subject to God's will". In prophetic biographies and hadith, where Muhammad becomes ill because of a magicical charm which is hidden "in a well"; the Prophet suffered from the magic but receives a dream or a visit from Gabriel to tell him how to be cured.

One scholar, Irmeli Perho, notes that all versions of the hadith (and all hadith dealing with witchcraft) signify Islamic belief in the power of magic to harm even so great a man as the Prophet of Islam, but the many different variants of the hadith include different solutions to the curse of the charm—in some God's power against the charm is so great Muhammad does not bother to take the magic object(s) out of the well; in others he is asked if he took them out, if he burned them, if he made a counter spell against the charm. In many hadith he answers "God, He is powerful and great, has already cured me", but in one version that statement is absent and Muhammad is only cured after the charm (a knot) is taken and disassembled—these variants representing to Perho how Muslims don't all believe magic has the same level of power. In the hadith where Muhammad says "God has already cured me", God's power is described as "sufficient to counter the power of magic" and only an outsider/enemy is involved in magic, whereas in the latter hadith "human action" was required to counter the magic. Believers in human action against harmful witchcraft will indicate support for use of "protective spells" and counter spells.

== Religious permissibility ==
=== Classical period ===
According to Tobias Nünlist, rather than condemning magic and occultism as whole, Muslim writers on the subject usually distinguished between licit and illicit magical practises. According to Henrik Bogdan, Gordan Djurdjevic, contrary to Western esotericism and occultism, there is no clear conflict between orthodoxy and occultism in Islam. Traditionally, Islam distinguishes between magical miracles bestowed by God as a blessing, and demonic magic. Whether or not sorcery/magic is accessed by acts of piety or disobedience is often seen as an indicator whether sorcery/magic is licit or illicit.

Hadith allows the usage of magic for the purpose of healing as long as they do not contain acts of shirk (lit. associating something [with God]; i.e. polytheism). Another hadith narrates about a practitioner of magic who sought to heal Muhammad from an alleged spirit-possession, but then he meets Muhammad, he learns that Muhammad is inspired by the Holy Spirit and converts to Islam. The story describes the general attitude of magic in Islam: magic is not evil, but inferior to Islam. Ahmad Ibn Hanbal (780-855 CE) "refrained from condemning" those who used magic to heal, to "the same class as sahirs". Tabasi (d. 1089) offered a wide range of rituals to perform sorcery, but also agreed that only magic in accordance with sharia is permissible. Ibn al-Nadim (932-995) -- a "bookish" pious Muslim, concedes the permissibility of white magic and but condemns the practice of black magic. He traces licit magic back to King Solomon (the prophet Sulaimān ibn Dāwūd in Islam) and illicit to Iblis (leader of the devils in Islam). The licit magicians included exorcists. They obeyed Islamic law and invoked God's name. Illicit magicians or sorcerers, controlled by or controlling demons by deeds or offerings that were displeasing to God. According to Ibn Khaldūn, Miracles (karāmāt), belong to licit magic and are considered gifts of God and distinct from illicit magic (siḥr):

The difference between miracles and magic is this: a miracle is a divine power that arouses in the soul [the ability] to exercise influence. The [worker of miracles] is supported in his activity by the spirit of God. The sorcerer, on the other hand, does his work by himself and with the help of his own psychic power, and, under certain conditions, with the support of devils. The difference between the two concerns the idea, reality, and essence of the matter.

Since the early stages of Islam, Muslim scholars from "multiple theological and legal schools" who disapproved of magic and sorcery did not necessarily considered magic to be evil or sinful, but rather nonsensical or deceptive. Rejection of sorcery by Classical scholars was not based on reason so much as Quranic exegesis. One example is the exegesis on Surah al-Falaq by early scholars, such as Zamakshari (1074 –1143). Hanafi jurist Abu Bakr al-Jaṣṣās, argued that if magic was actually real, its practitioners would be rich and powerful rather than impoverished hustlers of common people in the marketplace. Al-Jahiz's Kitāb al-Hayawān offers a variety of psychological explanations for alleged encounters with jinn (ghul) and devils (waswas). The Mu'tazilite rationalists held that magic and sorcery is mere image-making without reality. Ibn Sina (c. 980–1037) and Fakhr al-Din al-Razi (1149 or 1150–1209), describe magic as merely a tool with the outcome of an act of magic determining whether it is legitimate or not. Al-Razi (c. 1150–1209) "includes under sorcery the use (isti'ana, seeking help) of the hidden properties (khawass) of foodstuffs, medicines and unguents"; but traditional medicines are both widely practiced in the Islamic world and "never subject to religious censorship".

=== Contemporary period ===
Criticism on the supernatural was adopted in modern times. Salafi scholars, such as Muhammad Abduh, Rashid Rida, Muhammad Asad, and Sayyid Qutb, reject magic and associated traditions, interpretating references to sorcery and witchcraft in a metaphorical way.

Muhammad ibn Abd al-Wahhab (1703–1792), founder of Wahhabism, considered sorcery as one of the few sins where killing was a "divinely sanctioned punishment". 20th century scholar Muhammad Nasiruddin al-Albani stated that those who have "the conviction that sorcery has effect of its own accord, and not because of God's decision and will", will not enter paradise.

As of 2013, "stricter laws, arrests, and executions have resulted in efforts to deter magical practices" in "Afghanistan, Gaza, Bahrain, and Saudi Arabia". According to Ahmed Ferky Ibrahim, (professor of Islamic law at McGill University), while "capital punishment for magic is rooted in Islamic history", it was seldom applied historically. "When you read 16th- through 19th-century Ottoman court records, for instance, you realize there was no inquisition of magicians, no witch hunts, as was the case in Christian Europe ...The frequent persecution of magicians is indeed a recent phenomenon". Sorcery is also a crime in Nigeria. Wahhabi preacher Bilal Philips has attempted to distinguish between allowed and forbidden use of magic by referring to a hadith where a surah with supposedly supernatural properties were recited but not written down and used as charms.

On an occasion when a spell had been cast on him, [Prophet Muhammad] told Ali ibn Abi Talib to recite the two chapters [al-Falaq and an-Nas] verse by verse, and when he became ill he used to recite them on himself

as an example of licit magic and noted that Muhammad "did not write them down and hang them around his neck, tie them on his arm or around his waist", as examples of what is illicit.

Modern Asharites and Maturidites usually argue against the rejection of magic and a distinction between the natural and supernatural in general. Adhering to Occasionalism, there would be no restriction on God designing the natural law. God could deviate from the generally assumed order and bestow magical abilities on someone anytime and changing natural laws. Asserting that only God's will exists, they reject the dichotomy of supernatural and natural.

In contemporary Shia Islam, the cleric Sayyid Abdul Husayn Dastghaib Shirazi, considers the ability to perform licit magic to happen because of great "piety and abstinence". The miracle worker must "invoking the name of God", is "the most righteous and knowledgeable person of his time", and "does not claim to be a prophet".

== Divination ==
In the early and classical Islamic world divination (gaining information about future events or things unseen by occult methods) encompassed a range of techniques, "grouped roughly" into those "largely intuitive" (for example, water diviners observed the behaviour of animals, such as the hoopoe, to discover "the presence of underground water") and those employing "numerical or mechanical methods". interpreting the will of God by examining "the conformation of animal parts"; the patterns appearing on the "surface of water, oil, or ink, (hydromancy); dream interpretation (oneiromancy); "Few details remain of the specific methods" used in these intuitive techniques. Predicting changes in weather patterns "based on the visibility of important star-groups", was the subject of a tract by al-Kindi c. 801–873 CE) and another tract "is still in circulation today, at least in Iraq".

Historian Emilie Savage-Smith translates divination from the term Kaḥanat. Divination (i.e. "prediction of future events or gaining information about things unseen" by way of an occultic, standardized process or ritual), has been called "a branch of magic" by "Muslim encyclopedists, such as al-Afkānī, Tāshköprüzade, and Ḥājjī Khalīfah".

Toufic Fahd describes the difference between divination and magic as blurred. Both share a "practical and nontheoretical character"; use "supernatural means to predict natural elements", and share the technique of obtaining knowledge from "demonic inspiration"; but in "Islamic magical literature", the two "run parallel without mingling".

=== Physiognomy ===
Divining using "specific parts of the human body" (physiognomy), such as twitching eyelids or other involuntary movements, "the shape and appearance of the hands, joints, and nails" (`ilm al-kaff) and chiromancy or palmistry (employing lines on the hands - ʿilm al-asārīr), "were, and still are popular" in the Muslim world. Physiognomy does not try to align "physical characteristics with character traits" but to use them to read the future. Twitching eyelids, for example, would not indicate a nervous personality but might foretell "the success or failure of an enterprise".

=== Astrology ===
In Islamic history, Astrology (ʿilm al-nujūm, "the science of the stars"), was "by far" the most popular of the "numerous practices attempting to foretell future events or discern hidden things", according to Savage-Smith. It has several sub categories:

- the relatively simple "non-horoscopic astrology" that involves "the prediction of events based upon the rising or setting of certain star groups";
- "judicial astrology" involving "calculating the positions of planets and the mathematical production of horoscopes"
  - to determine the fate of individuals, countries, or dynasties,
  - of "auspicious and inauspicious days"; and
  - to answer specific questions—the location of lost objects, buried treasure, or "the diagnosis and prognosis of disease".

=== Conjuration ===
According to various folktales, it is possible for a pious person to summon jinn, spirits, or devils and force them to do their biddings. This practice derives from the Islamic legend of the prophet Solomon.

Some magical practice attempt to bring spirits, angels, jinn, and devils, at the magicians service. Istinzāl refers to the practice of making angels and jinn perceptible. However, only the prophets could perceive the celestial angels. According to Ḥād̲j̲d̲j̲ī Ḵh̲alīfa ordinary humans could only perceive the terrestrial angels and even this is disputed.

=== Sortilege ===
Sortilege, or practice of casting lots and interpreting the results produced by chance (qurʿa), was used both to predict the future, and "as a means of determining a course of action or deciding between courses of action". While casting lots was "considered legitimate" in Islam, according to Savage-Smith, two practices involving chance are prohibited by the Quran:

- istiqsam—a pre-Islamic "use of rods to settle disputes or give simple omens";
- maysir ("the game of the left-handed"), "involving arrows and the slaughtering of animals".

=== Letter number interpretation ===
Using the "numerical values of letters" to form a word (ʿilm al-ḥurūf) has been used as divination. Treatises on divination maintained that "the victor and vanquished" of some battle or event could be determined by "calculating the numerical value of the names of the contenders, dividing each by nine, and finding the remainders on the chart". More complicated techniques involved combining the letters of one of the 99 names of God "with those of the name of the desired object" (jafr). An "even more" complicated form involved creating an "intricate circular chart ... concentric circles, letters of the alphabet, elements of astrology, and poetry" and calculating "the degree of the ecliptic on the eastern horizon".

=== Quranic treatment ===
"Quranic treatment" is made up of practices based "exclusively" on "reciting Qur'anic texts, and defining exactly what this implies". Elements of the 'Qur'anic treatment include "talking about the patient's troubles", recitation of ruqyah—i.e specific Quranic verses (and dua) (see notes below) and prolonging the treatment "if no progress is observed". Though based on revealed scripture and religious belief, parts of the treatment also have "obvious psychotherapeutic value"—recitation of scripture the patient believes to be divine, emphasis on the patient talking about their problems, "repetition of simple rituals within a well-defined time schedule over a certain period of time"—and as of 2005, was "highly fashionable" even among the Muslim elite in places like Cairo.

== Works about magic ==
Ibn al-Nadim, Muslim scholar of his Kitāb al-Fihrist, describes a book that lists 70 ʿafārīt led by Fuqṭus (Arabic: فقْطس), including several ʿafārīt appointed over each day of the week. A collection of late 14th- or early 15th-century magico-medical manuscripts from Ocaña, Spain describes a different set of 72 jinn (termed "Tayaliq") again under Fuqtus (here named "Fayqayțūš" or Fiqitush), blaming them for various ailments. According to these manuscripts, each jinni was brought before King Solomon and ordered to divulge their "corruption" and "residence" while the jinn-king Fiqitush gave Solomon a recipe for curing the ailments associated with each jinni as they confessed their transgressions.

As a "good representative" of the kind of literature attacking the practice of magic, Kruk cites a popular, widely available book (al-Sarim al-Battar fi tasaddi li-l-sahara al-ashrar), on "how to deal with sorcery and its evil effects", written from a Wahhabi viewpoint, by Saudi shaykh Wahid 'Abd al-Salam (or Ibn al-Salam) Bali. (Note: Bali's first book --Wiqayat al-insan min al-jinn wa-l-shaytan -- was more narrowly on the dangers of jinn and how to protect yourself from them) The book calls for

- treating sihr al-junan (madness-sorcery), sihr al-khumul (apathy-sorcery), various sexual afflictions, by incantations to drive out the jinn that is occupying the victim's brain or other parts of his body; or
- treating inability to have intercourse with your wife by urinating on the heated blade of a sharp axe.
- treating a stomach ache by drinking water "over which Qur'anic passages have been recited".
- describing sihr al-nazif (sorcery which allegedly causes vaginal bleeding outside menstruation and may go on for months) as being brought about by 'a trampling of the devil on one of the veins in the womb'. Its treatment is drinking water over which a "Qur'anic incantation has been recited", and taking baths in the water "for three days".
- treating the evil eye (which is not caused by jinn) with "ritual bathing" and "pious incantations".
- "foremost" among the ruqa (spells and incantations) allowed to be recited into the ear of the afflicted by Islamic healers is the ruqya; an incantation made up of 41 "Quranic verses, formulas and short chapters". (Note: the ruqya consists of the following Qur'anic verses, formulas and short chapters: 1. a'aidhu-formula; 2. al-Fatiha; 3. a 'iidhu-formula; 4. al-Baqara 1-5; 5. a'aidhu- formula; 6. al-Baqara 102; 7. a 'aidhu; 8. al-Baqara 163-4; 9. a 'adhu; 10. al-Baqara 285-6; 11. a'aidhu; 12. al-Baqara 255; 13. a'aidhu; 14.Al-'Imran 18-9; 15. a'adhu; 16. al-A 'raf54, 56; 117-122; 17. 30x the Qur'anic words: waalqd al-sahara sdjidina; 18. a'aidhu; 19. Yunus 81-2, repeated; 20. a'adhu; 21. Taha 69; 22. a'aidhu; 23. al- Mu'minuna 115-8; 24. a 'aidhu; 25. al-Safat 1-10; 26. a'acdhu; 27. al-Ahqaf29-32; 28. a 'aidhu; 29. al-Rahman 33-6; 30. a 'aidhu; 31. al- hashr 21-4; 32. a 'aidhu; 33. al-Jann 1-9; 34. a'adhu; 36. basmala; 37. al-Ikhlas; 38. basmala; 39. al-Falaq, repeated a number of times; 40. basmala; 41. an-Nas)

Shia cleric Sayyid Abdul Husayn Dastghaib Shirazi, who states on his webpage on Al-Islam that "a Muslim who indulges in magic and does not repent is punished by death", goes on to affirm that "many" Islamic jurists are of the opinion that "countering one magic spell by another is permitted", and gives examples of how

- 'ʿAlī ibn Abī Ṭālib (the first Shia Imam and fourth Rashidun caliph) told a victim of witchcraft to carry a prayer of invocation/supplication written "on the skin of deer" and always keep it with him;
- how Abbas the Safawid compelled a Christian to convert to Islam using tasbih (prayer beads) "made of dust from Imam Husain (a.s.)'s grave", (both sounding very much like magic charms).

== In Muslim society ==
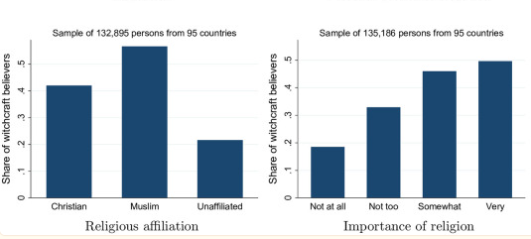
Share of population group believing in witchcraft, based on PEW Surveys from 2008 to 2017

According to a Pew Research Center survey conducted in 2011–2012 of Muslims around the world, a majority of Muslims surveyed in the Middle East North Africa, Turkey, South Asia, and Southeast Asia believe in Jinn—However, less than 20% of those surveyed thought that making offerings to jinn was an "acceptable part of Islamic tradition". Belief in talismans, witchcraft and spiritual healers, was not as widespread, ranging from one half to a quarter of Muslims in these regions. More religious Muslims are more likely to believe in the existence of jinn (spirits), talismans and other supernatural entities such as angels.

A study by Boris Gershman based on surveys conducted by the Pew Research Center (PRC) between 2008 and 2017 of 95 countries (predominantly in the Muslim world, Europe and the Western Hemisphere) found that more than half of Muslims believed in witchcraft (a higher rate than Christians and even higher than religiously unaffiliated respondents), and that the more religious the person surveyed was the more likely they were to believe in witchcraft.

According to Dawn Perlmutter, writing in 2013, "an entire industry of professional exorcists" has arisen in "the Middle East and among Western Muslims", performing Qur'anic healing, posting on YouTube and advertising on Facebook and Twitter. In Islamic literature there are detailed treatises that include "entire exorcism rites and purification rituals for the destruction of amulets and other magical items" to neutralize black magic.

=== Popular practices v. religious orthodoxy ===
==== Branches of magic ====
Some of "the more commonly used branches" of the art of magic listed by Dastghaib Shirazi and/or schools of the occult listed by the Ottoman-Turkic theologian Taşköprüzade:

- ʿIlm akham an nugum—Astrology
- ʿIlm as-Simiya—combines "will-power with particular physical and material forces for manipulating the natural order", and includes "eye-enchantment". Magic based on imagination, such as enchantments and magic of letters.
- ʿIlm al-Limiya or "the knowledge of subjugation of the spirits"—uses the psyche to bring "higher and stronger spirits" (such as "the spirits of the stars") under the control of the magician.
- ʿIlm al-Himiya or talisman—combines "the powers of the higher spiritual world" with the base elements of nature to "produce awe-inspiring effect".
- ʿIlm ar-Rimiya or ash-Sha'badhah—such as "sleight of hand, jugglery", creates the illusion of super-natural effects.
- ʿIlm al-firasa—Predicting the character of a person by his outer appearance.
- ʿIlm ta'bir ar-ru'ya—Interpreting dreams
- ʿIlm at-tillasmat—Talisman

Supplementary fields of magic are:

- ʿIlm al-Kimiya or alchemy—the transmuting (i.e. the attempt to transmute) base metals into gold or silver.
- ʿIlm al-Khafiyah or the hidden knowledge—discovers the names of "the angels or the satans" to be used to invoke those beings.

Still others are:

- ʿIlm Shoabada—is the creating of an illusion (such as by moving a burning ball in circles so that it appears to be a circle of fire).
- ʿIlm Taskhirāt—"the method of controlling Angels, Jinns, souls or various wild animals".
- ʿIlm Qayafa—the art of determining the lineage of an individual by use of magic.

Scholar Remke Kruk found books on magic and sorcery "extremely well represented" in "street stalls and bookshops" in the Muslim world from Marrakesh to Cairo to Yemen circa 2005. Practical handbooks on the subject were common, but with the "conservative" (called "orthodox" by Kruk) Islamic revival, "religious pamphlets condemning various practices" also became popular, starting around 1990. G. Hussein Rassool states that

Throughout the Muslim world, there are sorcerers, fortune tellers and traditional healers; many are in violation of interpretations of the Shari'ah (Islamic law). This leads the magicians or healers that use magic or witchcraft into the realm of major Shirk which refers to the association of a partner with Allah, the summoning other than God and relying on others beside Allah.

Kruk writes that "over the centuries" the Islamic scholars of "official Islam" have worked to forbid magical practices, but despite their efforts magic practices have "become intricately interwoven with religious elements and practices" in Islamic culture. Consequently, the line between forbidden and allowed "is so blurred that neither the practitioner nor the client" are often aware of when they are crossing that line.

On the one hand, practices approved by strict Islamic conservatives (called "orthodox" by Kruk) and revivalists to counteract magic include things like the use of water "over which the Quran has been recited" or to which have been added "salt, rose essence, oil of black caraway, or the leaves of the lote tree". On the other, in traditionally practised "magic and sorcery" now under attack from those strict conservatives, recitation of the 99 names of God and verses of the Quran play "a major part".

The practice of many Islamic healers who claim to talk to jinn for the purpose of curing and preventing the evil eye and exorcism of possession by jinn, is believed to be the extremely serious sin of shirk by some conservative Muslims. Kruk points out how fine the differences between approved and disapproved practices can be—it is acceptable to get in touch with jinn "in exorcisms" to threaten them, but it is shirk to ask their help in a healing; dissolving Quranic texts written on paper in water is forbidden, but "writing in bowls with ink that is washed off by the water poured into the bowl", is recommended by the well known conservative, Wahabbi-oriented cleric Wahid 'Abd al-Salam Bali. Kruk worries that the rise of stricter forms of Islam has led to an attack on healing "practices that used to be well integrated into Islamic life".

=== Afghanistan ===
Religious clerics (mullah) are consulted to ward off evil magic by means of good magic. Practitioners of black magic are said to rely upon evil spirits to cast sorcery, whereas the cleric use shamanistic rites in order to combat evil. Furthermore, there are several demonic creatures supposedly harassing the Afghan life, including jinn, ghosts, and demons. White magic is used to defend against such spirits and referred to as nuri (divine light), whereas evil magic is related to Satan and called nari (fiery).

=== Malaysia ===
Malays make a distinction between white and black magic. The latter falls within the fields of Islam and does not violate any Islamic principle. It relies on Islamic purity rituals such as Islamic chanting (dhikr), the Quran, and mastery of the soul. Sorcery, on the other hand, are said to fall outside the folds of Islam and believed to call upon either foreign spirits (jinn) —which may include a variety of Indian deities— or the devils of the Islamic religion (shayāṭīn). Others also believe that magic roots in the intention (niyet) of a magically gifted person; either to heal or to harm.

=== Saudi Arabia ===
In Saudi Arabia (prior to the reign of Muhammad bin Salman), Harry Potter books were "forbidden" and men and women who tend to be drawn from expatriate communities have been beheaded on charges of sorcery. In 2009, a special "Anti-Witchcraft Unit" was "created and formalized", not only to investigate and pursue alleged witches, but to "neutralize their cursed paraphernalia, and disarm their spells". In that year, in just one region (Makkah) alone, "at least 118 people were charged with 'practicing magic' or 'using the book of Allah in a derogatory manner'". By 2011, the Anti-Witchcraft Unit had established nine witchcraft-fighting bureaus in cities across the Saudi, and processed "at least 586 cases of magical crime". In 2007, an Egyptian pharmacist, Mustafa Ibrahim, was beheaded in Riyadh after being convicted on charges of "practicing magic and sorcery" as well as other charges. In 2008, police went to the trouble of luring a well-known Lebanese television psychic, Ali Hussain Sibat, into a sting operation while he was in Saudi on hajj (pilgrimage to Mecca). He was sentenced to death but had his sentenced reduced to 15 years in prison "after outcry from international human rights organizations". In September 2011 a Sudanese man was beheaded, having been caught in another sting operation "set in motion by the religious police". Human rights workers allege that accused in Saudi Arabia are often foreign domestic workers from Africa and Southeast Asia who often are simply practicing folk medicine from their country or who are charged with witchcraft by their employers in retaliation for taking those employers to court for refusal to pay wages. (The power of the Committee for the Prevention of Vice and Promotion of Virtue that oversees the anti-witchcraft unit has been sharply curtailed under the reign of crown prince Muhammad bin Salman.)

=== Iran ===
In Iran in 2011, 25 advisers and aides of the then President Mahmoud Ahmadinejad and his chief of staff Esfandiar Rahim Mashaei were arrested on charges of practising sorcery and black magic. According to "the top sorcerer among Iran's ruling elite" (top "according to associates clients and government officials"), Ahmadinejad met with him "at least twice" (Ahmadinejad denies the charges), and was just one among "dozens" of high Iranian government officials" who consult him on "matters of national security". The "top" sorcerer (claims to) regularly contact Jinn who "work for Israel's intelligence agency, the Mossad, and for the U.S. Central Intelligence Agency", and has had 'a long battle to infiltrate the Israeli jinn and find out what they know.'" The sorcerer also claimed that not only did jinn work for the U.S. and Israel, but that some were being used by him "to infiltrate" Israeli and U.S. intelligence agencies.

=== Gaza ===
In Gaza, exorcism is not illegal but treated with considerable suspicion by the Islamist ruling Hamas party, which claimed to have "exposed thirty cases of fraud" in one year, 2010.

=== Dubai ===
The BBC relates the story of a charismatic Mali-born confidence artist (Foutanga Babani Sissoko) who convinced the bank manager at Dubai Islamic Bank (Mohammed Ayoub) that he, Sissoko, using black magic, "could take a sum of money and double it" ("... he saw lights and smoke. He heard the voices of spirits. Then there was silence"). Between 1995 and 1998 Ayoub made 183 transfers into bank accounts of Sissoko—eventually totaling 890 million dirhams or $242 million—"expected it to come back in double the amount." However, after a time the Bank's auditors "began to notice that something was wrong" and Sissoko (who had left Dubai for the U.S. and then Mali) stopped answering Ayoub's calls. Eventually the Dubai government covered the banks loses and Ayoub was convicted of fraud and sentenced to three years in prison. Rumour had it "he was also forced to undergo an exorcism, to cure him of his belief in black magic."

=== Pakistan ===
In Pakistan it is common to slaughter an animal to ward off evil and bad luck, it is especially efficacious is sacrificing a black goat. In December 2016, after 48 people died in the crash of a propeller-driven Pakistan International Airlines plane, a group of airline staff were seen slaughtering a black goat on the tarmac of Islamabad's airport. This practice is not restricted to the lower echelon of Pakistani society. When he was President of Pakistan, Asif Ali Zardari had a black goat sacrificed at his house every day to ward off black magic and the evil eye. (61% of Pakistani Muslim surveyed believe in the evil eye according to a 2012 Pew report.) Zardari was also known to seek the advice of a spiritual healer on when and where it was auspicious to travel.

== See also ==
- Alchemy in the medieval Islamic world
- Astrology in the medieval Islamic world – Islamic astrology of the Golden Age
- Islam and astrology
- Simiyya – Doctrine of Sufism
- Spirit possession and exorcism in Islam
- Sufism – Mystic practices in Islam
- Superstitions in Muslim societies
