= Duhaym =

Islamic scholar (787–859)

Imam Duhaym دحيم

Personal life
- Born: April 787 (170 AH)
- Died: December 859 (245 AH)
- Region: Middle East
- Occupation: Scholar, Traditionist, Jurist

Religious life
- Religion: Islam
- Denomination: Sunni
- Jurisprudence: Awza'i

Muslim leader
- Influenced: Ibn Hanbal, Yahya ibn Ma'in

Abu Sa'id Abd al-Rahman ibn Ibrahim ibn Amr ibn Maymun al-Dimashqi (Arabic: أَبُو سَعِيد عَبْد الرَّحْمَن ٱبْن إِبْرَاهِيْم ٱبْن عَمْرِو ٱبْن مَيْمُون الدِّمَشْقِيّ, romanized: ʾAbū Saʿīd ʿAbd al-Raḥmān ibn ʾIbrāhīm ibn ʿAmr ibn Maymūn al-Dimashqī; April 787 – December 859), commonly known by the laqab Duhaym (Arabic: دُحَيْم, romanized: Duḥaym), was an Islamic scholar and judge. He is mentioned by al-Bukhari. Duhaym is one of the most renowned scholars by Sunni Muslims.

== Biography ==
Abd al-Rahman ibn Ibrahim was born in 787 CE. He belonged to a family of mawali of the Quraysh, thus his nisba al-Qurashī. He was also known as Ibn al-Yatīm (son of al-Yatim), in reference the freedman al-Yatim.

Duhaym was associated with the Awza'i maddhab (school of thought). He occasionally visited Baghdad and was deeply respected by the prominent scholars Ibn Hanbal and Yahya ibn Ma'in. He was either a pupil or teacher of Ibn Hanbal. Amongst Duhaym's students include the renowned Hanbalis Ibrahim al-Harbi and Hanbal ibn Ishaq. Abu Dawud al-Sijistani is reported to have said about Duhaymː "Duhaym is reliable. No one in Damascus was like him in his time".

== Bibliography ==
- Hurvitz, Nimrod (2001). The Formation of Hanbalism: Piety Into Power. RoutledgeCurzon. ISBN 9780700715077.
