= Saleeg =

Saudi white-rice dish

Saleeg - سليق
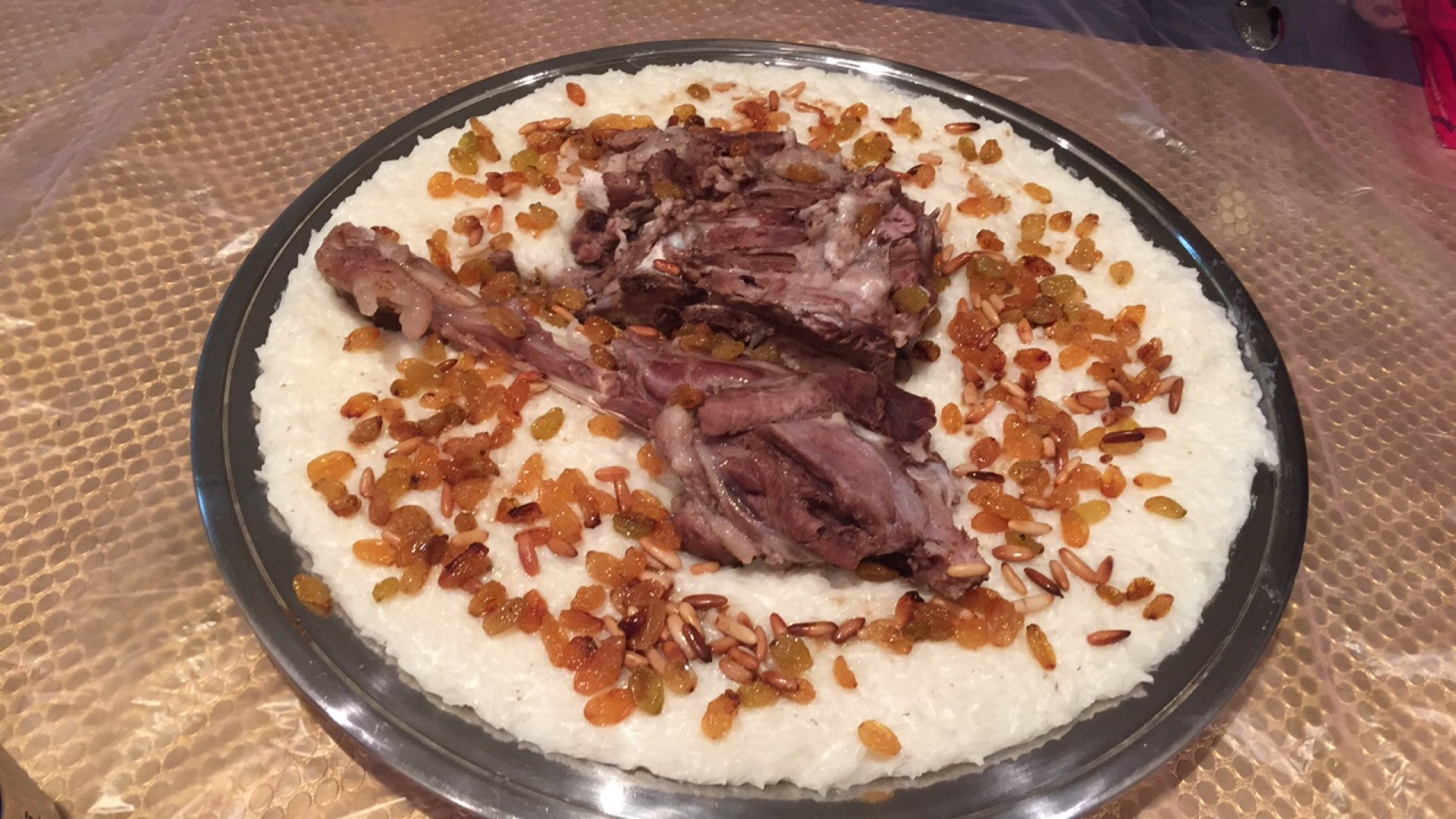
- Course: Main
- Place of origin: Saudi Arabia
- Region or state: Hejaz
- Associated cuisine: Saudi cuisine
- Serving temperature: Hot
- Main ingredients: rice, broth, butter, milk

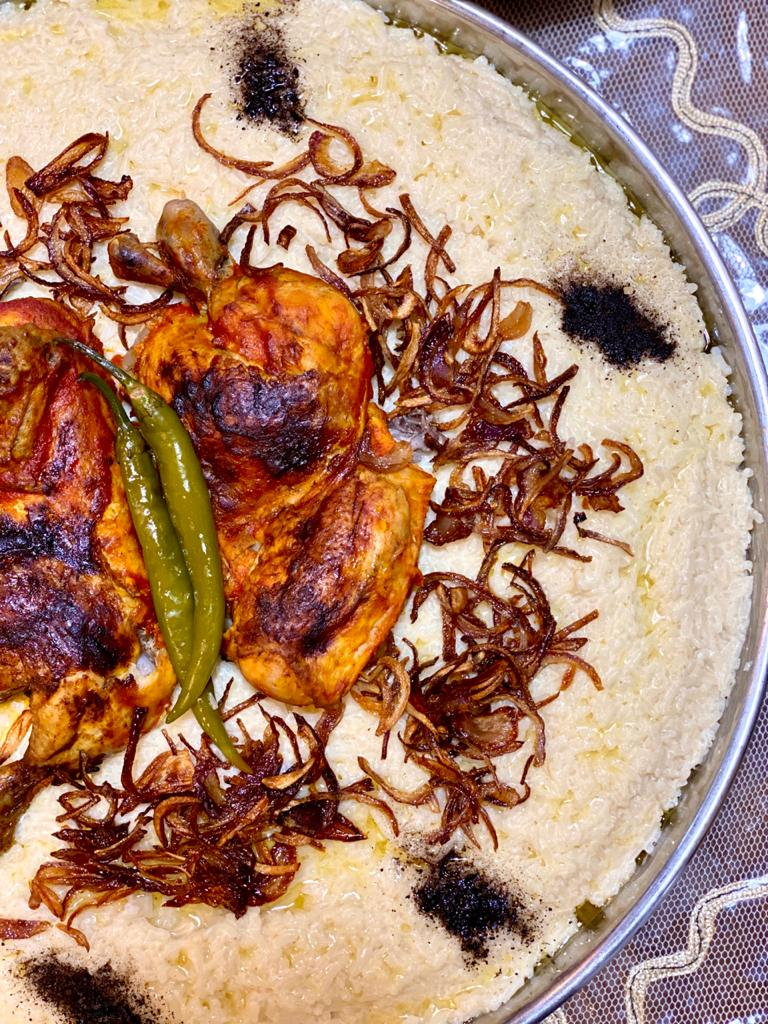
A picture of Chicken Saleeg

Saleeg (Arabic: سَلِيق, romanized: Salīg, Hejazi Arabic pronunciation: [saˈliːg]) is a white-rice dish, cooked with broth (chicken or other meat) and milk. It originates in Hejaz region in the west of Saudi Arabia, where it is commonly regarded as a national dish of the region. The dish is very popular in the city of Taif. Saleeg originated in the Hijaz region but is now popular all over the Arab world. Some people say that it tastes like the Italian risotto. It is usually eaten during traditional celebrations such as Shabana. A traditional large plate called tabasi is regularly used for serving Saleeg, and the roasted meat is usually on top of the rice. Saleeg is generally accompanied by a Daggus salad, a spicy tomato sauce, and decorated with ghee.

== Etymology ==
The name comes from the word salīq (Arabic: سليق), literally meaning "boiled", referring to the technique used in the cooking where the ingredients are all boiled.

== History ==
Ibrahim Alyamani is the oldest Saudi chef that introduced Saleeg to the people. He inherited this recipe from his father. Ibrahim was the first chef that opened a local restaurant that offered Saleeg in Taif in 1936. Taif is a city where it is cold all year round since it is at an elevation of 1,879 m (6,165 ft); thus, Saleag became well-known since it is warm and filling for people in Taif.

== Ingredients ==
Saleeg is traditionally made with rice (usually long-grain), milk, butter, olive oil, and a mixture of spices. The spices that are often used in Saleeg are cardamom pods, salt, black pepper, cinnamon, bay leaf, mastic. The meat that is usually used in Saleeg is chicken, beef, or lamb.

The usual ingredients for daggus salad are red onions, coriander, tomatoes, lemon, salt, black pepper, olive oil, and red chili.
