= Arif Agha Mosque, Iraq =

Mosque and mausoleum in Baghdad, Iraq

Arif Agha Mosque
- مسجد عارف آغا
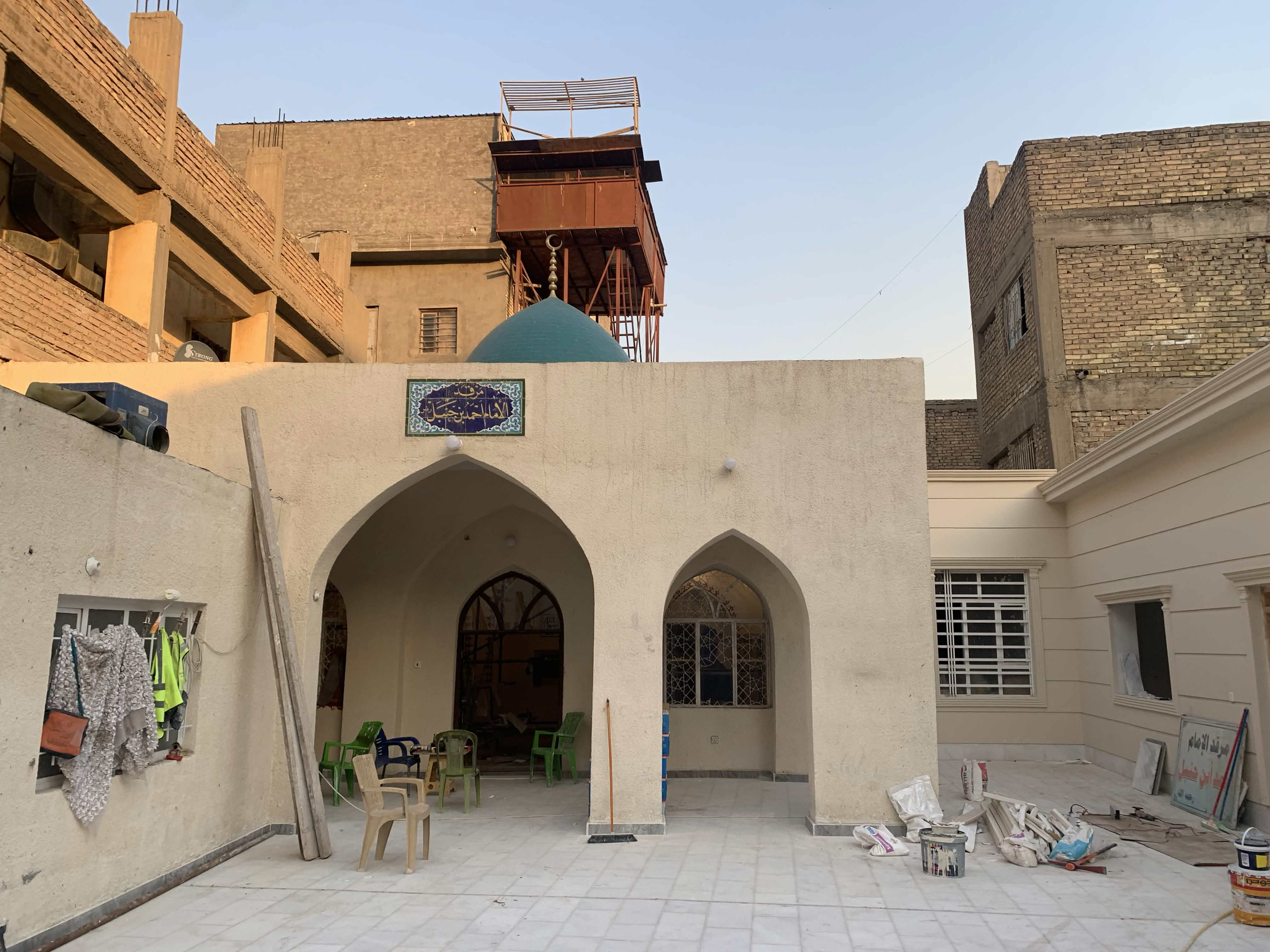
- The mosque in 2026 during reconstruction

- Location of the mosque in Baghdad

Religion
- Affiliation: Sunni Islam
- Ecclesiastical or organizational status: Mosque and mausoleum
- Status: Active

Location
- Location: Rusafa, Baghdad, Baghdad Governorate
- Country: Iraq
- Interactive map of Arif Agha Mosque
- Coordinates: 33°20′40″N 44°23′17″E

Architecture
- Type: Mosque architecture
- Style: Ottoman
- Completed: Before 1937

Specifications
- Capacity: 30 worshippers
- Interior area: 300 m^{2} (3,200 sq ft)
- Dome: One
- Shrine: One: Ahmad ibn Hanbal

The Arif Agha Mosque (Arabic: مسجد عارف آغا), later known as the Imam Ahmad ibn Hanbal Mosque (Arabic: مسجد الإمام احمد بن حنبل), is a small Sunni mosque, located in the Rusafa area of the city of Baghdad, Iraq. The mosque was built during the Ottoman period, and it contains a small mausoleum which is purported to be the burial place of Ahmad ibn Hanbal, the founder of the Hanbali school of thought, whose body was moved from its original place of burial to the mosque during a damaging flood.

== Historical background ==
=== Ahmad ibn Hanbal ===
Ahmad ibn Hanbal (780–855) was an early Muslim scholar, muhaddith and the founder of the Hanbali school of thought. He was buried in the cemetery at Bab al-Harb alongside other Muslim scholars and ascetics like Bishr al-Hafi. In the 13th century, the traveller Yaqut al-Hamawi mentioned the existence of the grave of Ahmad ibn Hanbal in the cemetery. The location of Bab al-Harb has been identified to be located in the Kadhimiyya area, near the tombs of Musa al-Kadhim and Bishr the Barefoot.

=== 19th and 20th-century ===
==== Arif Agha ====
The name, Arif Agha Mosque, possibly comes from the Iraqi noble family of the same name dating back to Dawud Pasha's reign. The family's name comes from Arif Agha who owned a majlis in which he and his friends discuss several topics. The majlis' leadership would be succeeded by his son, Mahmud Effendi Arif Agha, after his father's death in 1864. The majlis, alongside the family's house, was located in the Haydar-Khana locality near a mosque which was at the time called the Nazanda Khatun Mosque. Mahmud Effendi passed away in 1940.

==== The mausoleum ====
In 1937, the remains of Ahmad ibn Hanbal were supposedly transferred to the Arif Agha Mosque after the cemetery he was buried in was flooded by the Tigris. Later historians have doubted the story, saying that it is inaccurate and erroneous. Before this, a domed mausoleum had been built over the grave of Ahmad ibn Hanbal, but it was destroyed repeatedly.

According to the traveler Ibn Battuta, there had been many attempts to construct a mausoleum over the grave of Ahmad ibn Hanbal, but zealous locals would demolish the structure after it had been erected. The current mausoleum was established in a room in the Arif Agha Mosque. It was then reconstructed in 1998.

Local tradition narrates that in 1937, the cemetery of Bab al-Harb had been flooded and hence the bodies had to be reburied; with Ahmad ibn Hanbal's body taken to the Arif Agha Mosque and reburied in a room there. However, no evidence has been found for this story, leading to modern historians doubting it. Additionally, the historian and scholar al-Bandaniji (d. 1866) stated that Ahmad ibn Hanbal was buried in an unmarked grave at the Bab al-Harb that had its marker swept away over time, leaving no trace of its existence; the cemetery did not survive as well according to al-Bandaniji himself.

== Architecture and description ==
The mosque was completed in the Iraqi-Ottoman style, most likely before 1937, and is located in the Haydar-Khana locality. It consists of a prayer hall, courtyard, and a small room topped by a dome which serves as a mausoleum. The total area of the mosque is approximately 300 square metres (3,200 sq ft), and the mausoleum room cannot hold more than 30 visitors. It has a small courtyard. The main entrance to the mosque is very narrow, and the inside can only fit 30 people.

Inside, the tomb of Ahmad ibn Hanbal is located in the main room behind the qibla wall. The marble tombstone atop the grave is covered with layers of cloth and silk, all of which were donated over time by the various pilgrims visiting the site.

== Present day ==
The current building receives no attention from the general Iraqi population, who adhere to the Ahl al-Bayt traditions and the Hanafi school of thought more. As well as the mausoleum being located in an obscure part of the neglected Haydar-Khana locality.

The mausoleum had entered a rather dilapidated and unfurnished state over time, with the only visits being pilgrims who had come to perform ziarat to the graves of the holy saints in Baghdad. In 2021, al-Jazeera reported that the mausoleum received less visits than usual due to the COVID-19 pandemic. Additionally, al-Jazeera stated that the last renovation of the mausoleum was in 2010 with the locals refusing to restore it due to the Hanbali school's prohibition on domed mausoleums. In late December 2025, however, the Sunni Endowment Office, approved funding to restore the mausoleum due to its importance.

== See also ==
- List of mosques in Baghdad
- Islam in Iraq
