= Tabasi =

Tabasi or al Tabasi (Persian: طبسی) is a surname. Notable people with the surname include:

- Abu al-Fadl Muhammad al Tabasi (died 1089), Sunni Islamic author based in Nishapur
- Mohammad Reza Tabasi, Iranian scholar
- Najm al-Din Tabasi (b. 1955), Iranian Ayatollah
