= Sunni Endowment Office =

Iraqi government agency

The Sunni Endowment Office, or Sunni Endowment Diwan (Arabic: ديوان الوقف السني, romanized: Diwan al-Waqf al-Suniyi), is an Iraqi agency created by the Iraqi Governing Council after the fall of Saddam Hussein in 2003. It was created from the dissolution of the Ministry of Awqaf and Religious Affairs under former Ba'ath rule, separating from it the religious endowments (awqaf) of Shiite Islam and non-Islamic religions.

Its function is the administration of mosques and other endowments of Sunnis in Iraq.

== Creation ==
The creation of the Office occurred through Resolution No. 29 of 30 August 2003, which ordered the dissolution of the Ministry of Awqaf and Religious Affairs (Wizarat al-Awqaf) and the creation of three new endowment offices (Diwan al-Waqf) for the administration of the religious endowments of Sunnis, Shiites and other religions:

- Sunni Endowment Office
- Shiite Endowment Office
- Endowment Office of non-Muslim communities

The majority of the endowments of the former Ministry of Awqaf were of Sunni mosques, while the number of Shiite endowments was low, because under the previous government only Sunni Islam was protected by law.

The President of the Office is chosen by the head of government. In October 2012 the Iraqi General Assembly, with the Laws No. 56 and 57, for the Sunni Waqf and the Shiite Waqf respectively, stated that before appointment by the Iraqi Prime Minister, the President of the Office should be approved by the Fiqh Council of Senior Scholars for Preaching and Fatwas, as representative of the Sunnis, and the President of the Shiite Endowment Office by the Great Ayatollah, as representative of the Shiites.

== History ==
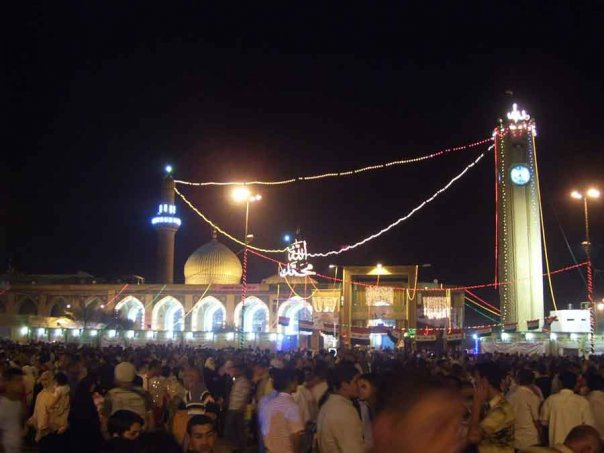
Abu Hanifa Mosque, in the Sunni-dominated neighborhood of Adhamiyah in Baghdad, headquarters of the Sunni Endowment Office

Since the separation of the holy places of Shiite Muslims and of other religions, the Sunni Endowment Office is responsible only for Sunni mosques and endowments. The office has also a new section for cultural moderation.

On 22 October 2003, the Iraqi Governing Council appointed Adnan al-Dulaimi as Office President.

In July 2005, the Iraqi Islamic Party, only Sunni party to participate in the new Iraqi General Assembly, appointed its deputy Ahmad Abd al-Ghafur al-Samarrai as Office President.

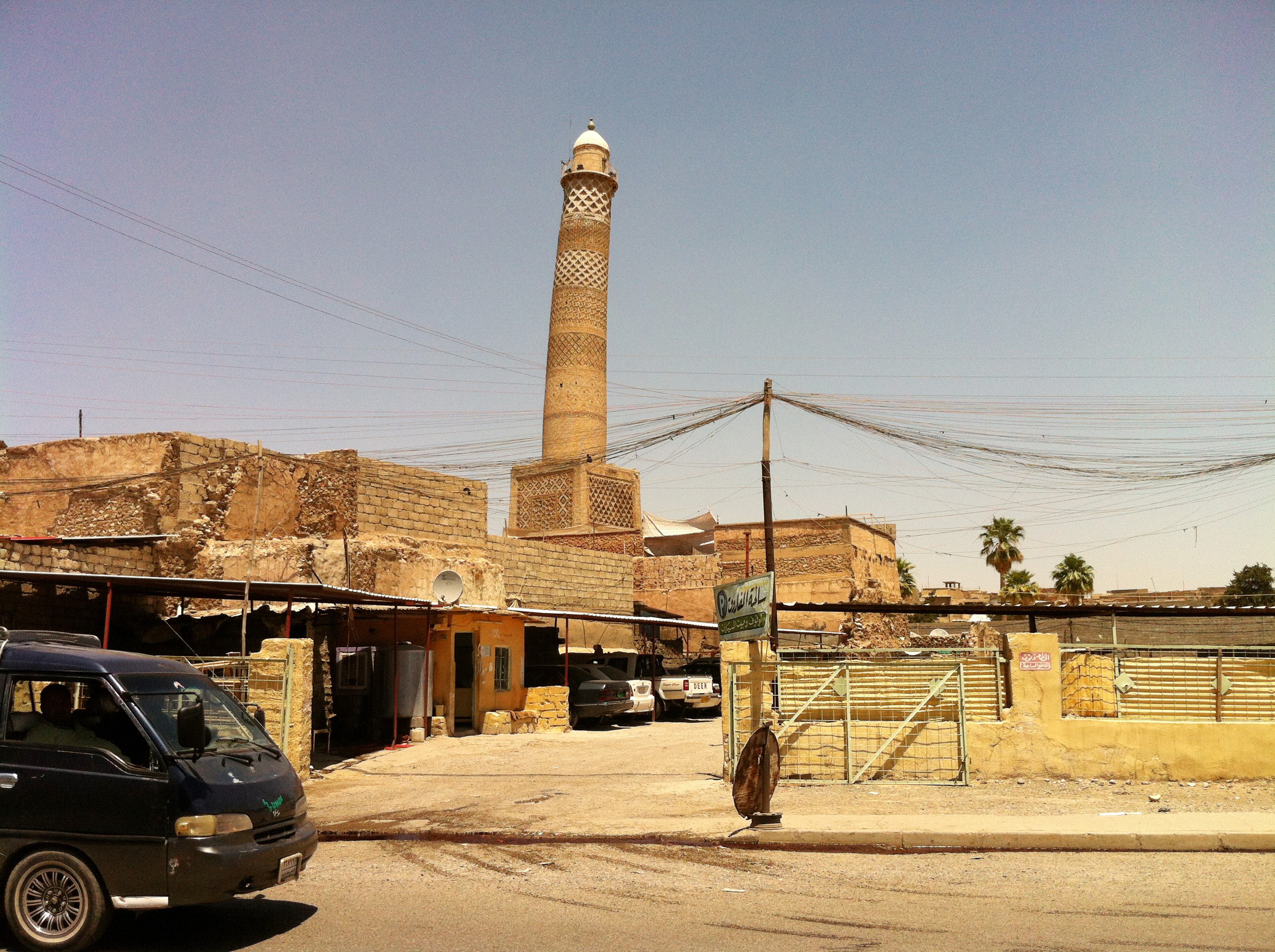
The minaret of the Great Mosque of al-Nuri in Mosul, 2013. The mosque was destroyed in 2017. Its reconstruction is planned within the next five years by the Sunni Endowment Office

In the following years, as soon as the Iraqi insurgency was defeated, the mosques administrated by the insurgents were transferred by the Iraqi Army to the Office.

In November 2013, during a new escalation of Sunni insurgency, the Shiite prime minister Nouri al-Maliki suspended Office President Samarrai and appointed deputy Mahmud al-Sumaydai, considered a more moderate Muslim.

In June 2015, new Iraqi Prime Minister Haider al-Abadi, head of a broad government coalition, appointed Abd al-Latif al-Humaym as Office President, despite the veto of the Fiqh Council of Sunni Ulema, of Islamist tendency, and the opposition of the Sunni Iraqi Fatwa Council, linked to the Popular Mobilization Forces and to Shiite parties.

As soon as the Iraqi Army recaptured areas from Daesh, Office President Humaym cooperated to rebuild places destroyed by the war, such as the town of Ramadi after its liberation in 2016, and the Great Mosque of al-Nuri of Mosul in 2018.

== List of presidents ==
- Adnan al-Dulaymi (April 2003 to July 2005)
- Ahmad Abd al-Ghafur al-Samarrai (July 2005 to November 2013)
- Mahmud al-Sumaydai (November 2013 to June 2015)
- Abd al-Latif al-Humaym (June 2015 to February 2020)
- Saad Kambash (February 2020 to March 2022)
- Abdul Khaleq Al-Azzawi (since March 2022)

== See also ==
- Imam Ahmad Bin Hanbal Shrine, under the endowment office
- Shiite Endowment Office
