= Shi'ite Endowment Office =

Iraqi governmental agency

Republic of Iraq Shi'ite Endowment Diwan
- ديوان الوقف الشيعي

Agency overview
- Formed: 2003
- Type: Independent
- Jurisdiction: Government of Iraq
- Headquarters: Baghdad, Iraq
- Agency executive: Haider al-Shammari, President
- Website: sed.gov.iq

The Shi'ite Endowment Office or Shi'ite Endowment Diwan (Arabic: ديوان الوقف الشيعي) is an Iraqi government agency created by the Iraqi Governing Council after the fall of Saddam Hussein in 2003. It was created as a result of the dissolution of the Ministry of Awqaf and religious Affairs in former Baath rule, separating from it the Holy Shrines, the mosques, the hawzas and all religious endowments of Iraqi Shias. It is a financially and administratively independent institution attached to the Council of Ministers.

== Overview ==
Its purpose is to promote cultural development of the Iraqi Shia community and manage heritage belonging to it including mosques, shrines, libraries, schools, and other real estate.

== Formation ==
The Office was created through the Resolution No. 29 of 30 August 2003, which stated the dissolution of the Ministry of Awqaf and religious Affairs (Wizarat al-Awqaf) and the creation of three new Endowments offices (Diwan al-Waqf) for the administration of the religious endowments of Sunnis, Shiites and Other religions:

- Sunni Endowment Diwan
- Shiite Endowment Diwan
- Christian, Ezidian and Sabian-Mandaean Endowment Diwan.

As of 2003, the majority of the endowments of the former Ministry of Waqf passed to the Sunni Endowment Office, because in the former rule only Sunni Islam was protected by law and only Sunni endowments were administrated by the State, but with the so-called Atabat law of December 2005 the major Islamic Shrines passed to the Shiite endowment administration, and later also many mosques formerly administrated by Sunnis.

The President of each Office should be appointed by the Head of the Government, but the Atabat law of 2005 stated that the major decisions concerning the Shiite endowment, as the appointment of the President of the office, should be approved by the Great Ayatollah Ali al-Sistani as a representative of Shiites, while noting the lack of a similar authority among the Iraqi Sunnis. Later, in October 2012, the Law No. 57 about the Shiite Waqf, confirmed that the president of the Shiite endowment office, before the appointment by the Iraqi Premier, should be approved by the Shiite Marja', while the Law No. 56 about the Sunni Waqf gave a similar power to a Council of Sunni ulemas, the "Fiqh Council of the ulemas".

== History ==
During Saddam Hussein's rule, the politics of the Ministry of Awqaf and religious Affairs was seen by Shiites as discriminatory towards them. So it was suppressed in August 2003 by the Iraqi governing council, in order to give religious freedom to the different religious components of Iraq. This created the problem to assign each religious site to a confession, causing rivalry among the different groups in order to gain the control of these sites. In 2004, a Committee was formed, including both Shiite and Sunni scholars, to determine the founders and donors of each endowment, through the State records of the former Ministry, thus definitely separating the formerly neutral Islamic endowments, who became matter of sectarian contention.

In December 2005 the so-called Atabat law conceded to the Shiite endowment the administration of the five major Iraqi Shrines of Shia, but was contested by the president of Sunni Endowment Office al-Sumarrai, who claimed that they had been administrated until then by Sunni families, as in particular the Shrine of Samarra, thus opening a legal dispute which ended in 2012 confirming the assignment to the Shiite Waqf.

Many mosques, especially those built during the Baath rule, had furthermore very profitable commercial endowments, thus determining also an economic competition for their parceling. During the first Sunni insurgency, many Sunni Imams were driven out by force from the mosques they had received by the Baath administration, and thus these mosques were added to the Shia endowment. A second legal Committee was created in 2008 in order to resolve the disputes concerning the sites claimed by both the confessions, but it stalled when the Shiite endowment office contested the validity of the documents dating back to Saddam Hussein.

In recent times, during the civil war, some disputes concerning ancient mosques in Baghdad with vestiges of both Islamic confessions, and thus not clearly recognized as belonging to only one of them, had been finally resolved in favor of Shiite Waqf. After the fall of Mosul, also ancient mosques of this town have become matter of contention.

== List of presidents ==
- Hussein al-Shami, 2003-2005
- Salih Muhammed al-Haidari, 2005-2015
- Ala’ al-Mussawi, 2015-2020
- Haider al-Shammari, 2020-present

== See also ==
- Ali al-Sistani
- Marja'
- Sunni Endowment Office

== Bibliography ==
- [1]: Stefan Talmon, The Occupation of Iraq: Volume 2: The Official Documents of the Coalition Provisional Authority and the Iraqi Governing Council, Bloomsbury Publishing, 8 February 2013 - 1572 pages
