= Bishr the Barefoot =

9th-century Muslim hermit and saint

Theologian
- Born: c. 767; Merv, Abbasid Caliphate (present-day Turkmenistan)
- Died: 841 (aged 73–74); Baghdad, Abbasid Caliphate
- Venerated in: Islam
- Influences: Prophets of Islam
- Influenced: Ahmad Ibn Hanbal

Bishr ibn al-Ḥārith (Arabic: بشر بن الحارث) better known as Bishr al-Ḥāfī (Bishr the Barefoot) (Arabic: بشر الحافي) was a Muslim saint born near Merv in about 767 C.E. He converted and studied Muslim tradition under Al-Fozail ibn Iyaz. Bishr became famous as one of the greatest saints in the area.

== Biography ==
Bishr was born in Merv and settled in Baghdad

=== Conversion Stories ===
==== Encounter with Musa al-Kadhim ====
One account of Bishr's conversion involves an encounter with Musa al-Kadhim. While passing by Bishr's house in Baghdad, Musa al-Kadhim saw a slave girl and asked her whether the owner of the house was a free man or a servant. She replied that he was a free man, to which Musa al-Kadhim responded, "If he were a servant, he would fear his Lord."

Upon hearing this account from the slave girl, Bishr ran barefoot to find Musa al-Kadhim, but he had already left. Bishr eventually caught up with him and asked him to repeat his words. Upon hearing them again, Bishr was deeply moved, fell to the ground in tears, and declared, "No, I am a slave, I am a slave!" From that moment, Bishr chose to walk without shoes, earning him the nickname Bishr al-Haafi (the Barefooted One). When asked why he remained barefoot, he would reply, "My master Allah guided me when I was barefooted, and I will remain in this condition till death."

==== Story from the Memorial of the Saints ====
Another story, narrated by Attar in the Memorial of the Saints, describes Bishr as having led a life of dissipation. One day, while drunk, he found a piece of paper inscribed with “In the Name of God, the Merciful, the Compassionate.” Bishr bought rose attar to perfume the paper and placed it reverently in his house. That night, a venerable man had a dream instructing him to tell Bishr:

"Thou hast perfumed My Name, so I have perfumed thee. Thou hast exalted My Name, so I have exalted thee. Thou hast purified My Name, so I have purified thee. By My Majesty, I will surely perfume thy name in this world and the world to come."

The man, perplexed by the dream, slept again and had the same dream two more times. The next morning, he sought out Bishr, finding him at a drunken party, and relayed the message from his dreams. Bishr immediately understood and told his companions, "I have had a call. I am going. I bid you farewell. You will never see me again at this business."

From that day forward, Bishr lived a saintly life, earning a reputation for his righteousness. He customarily walked barefoot, which led to his name "Bishr the Barefoot."

=== Acquaintances ===
Bishr the Barefoot was known to have been acquainted with Ahmad al-Muhajir, the grandson of Jafar al-Sadiq.

== Education ==
To learn hadiths, Bishr travelled to Kufa, Basra and Mecca. He learned hadiths from individuals such as Hamad b. Zayd, 'Abd Allah b. Mubarak, Malik b. Anas and Abu Bakr al-'Ayyash. He also learned from Ibrahim b. Sa'd al-Zuhri, Sharik b. 'Abd Allah, al-Fudayl b. Ayaz and Ali b. Khushram (uncle of Bishr). People including Abu Khuthayma, Zuhayr b. Harb, Sirri al-Saqati, 'Abbas b. 'Abd al-'Azim and Muhammad b. Hatam transmitted hadiths from him.

== See also ==
- Ali al-Uraidhi ibn Ja'far al-Sadiq
