= Ahmad ibn Hanbal =

Muslim scholar, jurist, and theologian (780–855)

Imam Shaykh al-Islam Master of Hadith Ahmad ibn Hanbal
- أحمد ابن حنبل
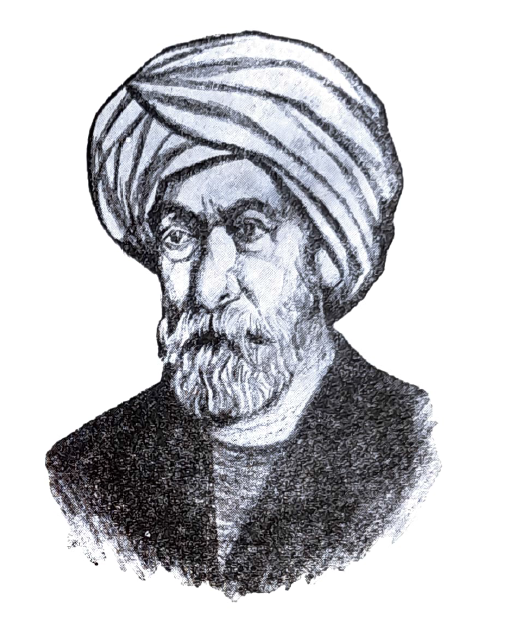
- A sketch representing Ahmad ibn Hanbal from a book entitled Sayr mulhimah: min al-Sharq wa-al-Gharb by unknown author, 1961
- Title: Shaykh al-Dunya ('Shaykh of the world')

Personal life
- Born: November 780 CE / Rabi' al-Awwal 164 AH Baghdad, Abbasid Caliphate (modern-day Iraq)
- Died: 2 August 855 CE / 12 Rabi' al-Awwal 241 AH (aged 74) Baghdad, Abbasid Caliphate (modern-day Iraq)
- Resting place: Mausoleum of Ahmad ibn Hanbal, Baghdad, Iraq; 33°20′40″N 44°23′17″E
- Spouse: ‘Abbasah bintul Fadl; Rayhanah; Husn (Concubine)
- Children: Abd Allah; Salih; Zainab; Al-Hasan (Died soon after birth); Al-Hussain (Died soon after birth); Al-Hasan; Muhammad; Sa'eed
- Parents: Muhammad Ibn Hanbal (father); Saffiyah bint Maimoonah bint 'Abdul Malik (mother)
- Era: Islamic Golden Age (early Abbasid)
- Region: Abbasid Caliphate
- Main interests: Jurisprudence; theology; hadith
- Notable idea: Hanbali school
- Notable works: Kitab as-Sunnah; Usul al-Sunna; al-Asami wa-l-Kuna; al-Ashriba; al-Zuhd; Fada'il al-Sahaba; Al-Musnad; Risala fi al-Salah li-Ahl al-Qibla
- Occupation: Scholar; jurist; theologian; traditionist
- Relatives: Hanbal Ibn Ishaq (Cousin) Ishaq Ibn Hanbal (Uncle)

Religious life
- Religion: Islam
- Denomination: Sunni
- Jurisprudence: Independent (eponym of the Hanbali school)
- Creed: Athari
- Movement: Ahl-al-hadith

Muslim leader
- Influenced by: Malik Ibn Anas; Sufyan ibn ʽUyaynah; Abd Allah ibn al-Mubarak; Abd al-Razzaq al-Sana'ani; Abu Thawr; Al-Shafi'i; Ishaq ibn Rahuyah
- Influenced: All Hanbalis
- Arabic name
- Personal (Ism): Aḥmad أحمد
- Patronymic (Nasab): Ibn Muḥammad ibn Ḥanbal ibn Hilāl ibn Asad ibn Idrīs ibn ʿAbd Allāh ibn Ḥayyān ابن محمد ابن حنبل ابن هلال ابن اسد ابن إدريس ابن عبد الله ابن حيان
- Teknonymic (Kunya): Abū ʿAbd Allāh أبو عبد الله
- Toponymic (Nisba): al-Shaybānī al-Dhuhlī الشيباني الذهلي

Ahmad ibn Hanbal (Note: Full name Abū ʿAbd Allāh Aḥmad ibn Muḥammad ibn Ḥanbal ibn Hilāl ibn Asad ibn Idrīs ibn ʿAbd Allāh ibn Ḥayyān al-Shaybānī al-Dhuhlī (Arabic: أبو عبد الله أحمد ابن محمد ابن حنبل ابن هلال ابن أسد ابن إدريس ابن عبد الله ابن حيان الشيباني الذهلي); he is known by the title Shaykh al-Islam.) (Arabic: أحمد ابن حنبل, romanized: Aḥmad ibn Ḥanbal; 780 – 855) was an Arab jurist and founder of the Hanbali school who is widely recognized as the scholar who memorized the most Hadiths (Note: Ibn Hanbal is renowned as the most prolific memoriser of hadith in history, having committed to memory over one million hadiths — a figure that includes not only the core texts of prophetic traditions but also their numerous variations in chains of transmission (isnads).) in Islamic history. One of the most venerated Islamic intellectual figures, Ibn Hanbal is notable for his unmatched memorization of over one million prophetic narrations, (Note: Abū Zurah mentioned that Aḥmad ibn Ḥanbal knew a million Hadith reports.” When asked how he knew, he replied: “He and I recited them to each other, and we went through the different topics.”) an unprecedented number that has never been claimed by any other muhaddith. (Note: Ibn Abī Ḥātim testified to his unmatched memory and retention. Al-Tustarī and other scholars also attested to Ibn Hanbal’s extraordinary memory, noting that he could recall the names of transmitters for each hadith without needing to write them down) Ibn Hanbal also compiled the largest hadith collection, al-Musnad, which has continued to exercise considerable influence on the field of hadith studies up to the present time, shaping the methodological framework later employed in both Sahih Bukhari and Sahih Muslim. Imam al-Dhahabi described him as “the true Imam, the proof of the religion, the master of hadith, and the leader of the Sunnah”. Imam Ali ibn al-Madini said: “Truly, Allah supported this religion through two men, to whom there is no third: Abu Bakr during the Ridda Wars, and Ahmad ibn Hanbal during the Mihna”.

Having studied jurisprudence and hadith under many teachers during his youth, Ibn Hanbal became famous in his later life for the crucial role he played in the Mihna instituted by the Abbasid caliph al-Ma'mun toward the end of his reign, in which the ruler gave official state support to the Mu'tazili doctrine of the Quran being created, a view that contradicted the orthodox position of the Quran being the eternal, uncreated word of God. Living in poverty throughout his lifetime working as a baker, and suffering physical persecution under the caliphs for his unflinching adherence to the traditional doctrine, Ibn Hanbal's fortitude in this particular event only bolstered his "resounding reputation" in the annals of Sunni history.

Heralded as one of the mujaddids, Ibn Hanbal later came to be venerated as an exemplary figure in all traditional schools of Sunni thought, both by the exoteric scholars and ascetic Sufis, with the latter often designating him as a saint in their hagiographies. Ibn al-Jawzi relates he "was the foremost in collecting the prophetic way and adhering to it."

In the last century, Ibn Hanbal's reputation became subject of debate in certain quarters of the world, as the Hanbali reform movement known as Wahhabism has cited him as a principal influence along with the 13th-century Hanbali reformer Ibn Taymiyya. However, it has been argued by certain scholars that Ibn Hanbal's own beliefs actually played "no real part in the establishment of the central doctrines of Wahhābism," as there is evidence, according to the same authors, "the older Hanbali authorities had doctrinal concerns very different from those of the Wahhabis," due to medieval Hanbali literature accordingly being rich in references to saints, grave visitation, miracles, and relics. Other scholars maintain he was "the distant progenitor of Wahhabism", who also immensely inspired the similar conservative reform movement of Salafism.

== Biography ==
=== Birth ===
Ahmad ibn Hanbal was born in November 780 CE. This was mentioned by his son Abdullah. Ibn Hanbal's family was originally from Basra, and belonged to the Arab Banu Dhuhl tribe. His father was an officer in the Abbasid army in Khorasan and later settled with his family in Baghdad.

Historians differ about his place of birth. Some say he was said that he was born in Merv, located near Mary, Turkmenistan today, where his father and grandfather had also previously worked. While according to others he was born in Baghdad after his mother came pregnant with him from the city of Merv, where his father was. The latter opinion is the most accepted one.

=== Upbringing ===
Ibn Hanbal lost his father when he was a young child. His father died young at the age of only thirty. His mother raised him under the care of those who remained from his father's family. His father had left him a property in Baghdad in which he lived, and another which yielded him a small rental income sufficient for his living. The reports are conflicting about whether it was large or small. Ibn Kathir mentioned its amount, saying: "His income from his property was seventeen dirhams each month, which he spent on his family, and he was content with that, seeking the mercy of Allah, patiently and seeking reward." It is also narrated that a man asked Imam Ahmad about the property he was using on which he made a house on. He replied: "This is something I inherited from my father. If a man comes to me and confirms that this is his, I will get rid of it and give it to him".

=== Marriage and children ===
Ahmad ibn Hanbal did not marry until he reached the age of forty. It is said that this was because he was busy with seeking knowledge and because he traveled a lot and was away from his country for a long time. When he reached the age of forty and became closer to settling down than before, he thought about marriage.

His first wife was "Abbasa bintul Fadl", an Arab woman from the suburbs of Baghdad, and she lived with Ahmad ibn Hanbal for thirty years (or twenty years according to some reports), and bore him their son "Salih", and hence her she was known by her title Umm Salih. Ibn Hanbal remarked about her: "In the 30 (or 20) years we were together, we never had a disagreement." After she died, Ahmad married his second wife, "Ummu 'Abdillah Rayhana bintu 'Uma" known simply as "Rayhana", and she bore him one son, "Abdullah". She was known for having only one eye, and Ibn Hanbal married her because he was impressed by her religious commitment. Reports suggest that they were together for seven years. He also had a concubine named "Husn", who bore him a female girl "Zainab", then twins, "Al-Hasan" and "Al-Hussein", who died after their birth. Then she bore "Al-Hasan" and "Muhammad", and then she bored him "Saeed". Among his sons, Salih and Abdullah excelled in jurisprudence, while Saeed later became the judge of Kufa.

=== Education and work ===
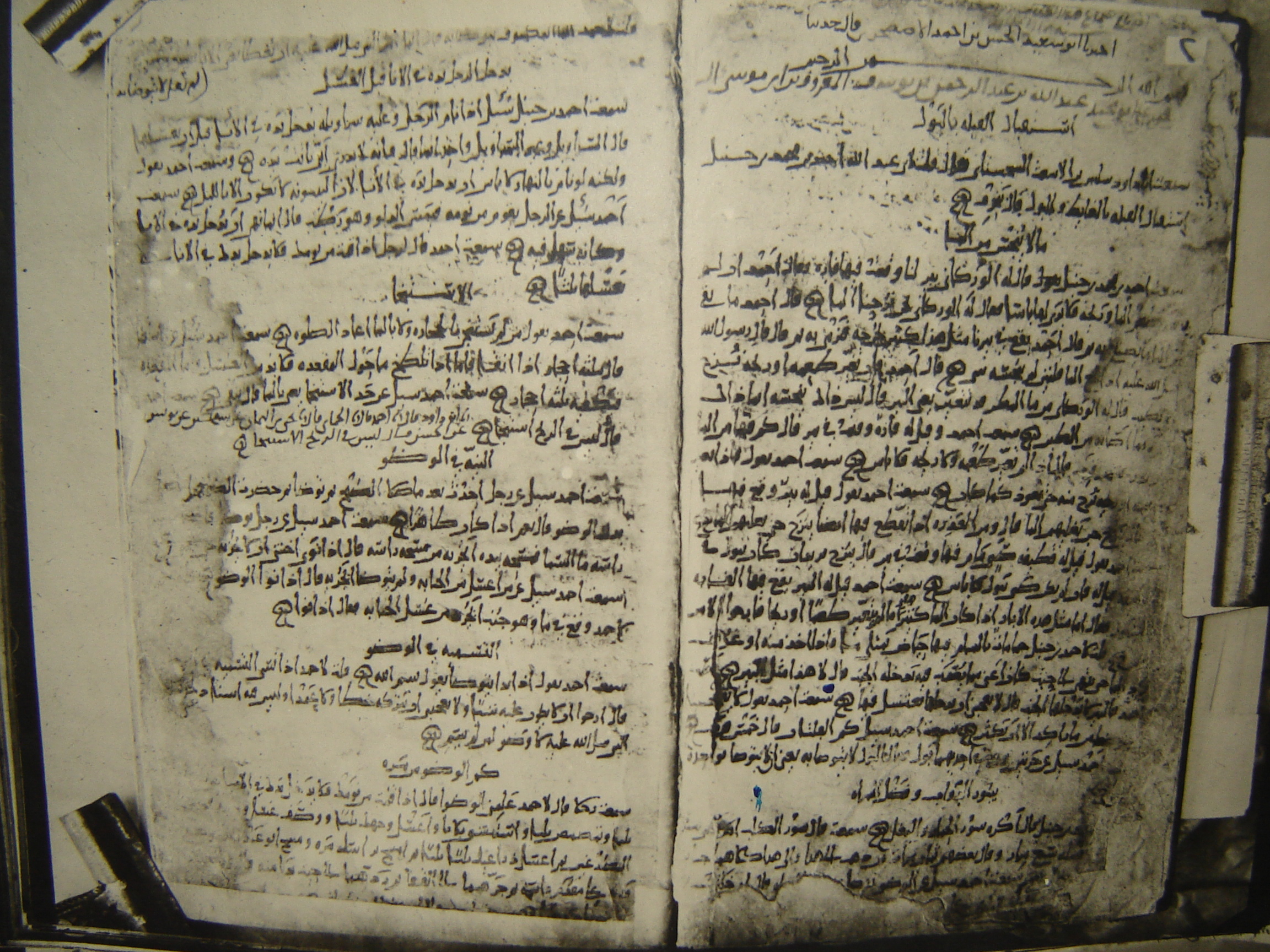
A manuscript of Ibn Hanbal's legal writings, produced October 879

Ibn Hanbal studied extensively in Baghdad, and later traveled to further his education. At the age of fourteen, he began to work as a scribe in Divan. He learnt the Qur'an from Yahya ibn Adam, and jurisprudence under the celebrated judge of Hanafi jurisprudence, Abu Yusuf, a student of Abu Hanifa. He learnt Quran from Yahya ibn Adam. After completing his studies with him, Ibn Hanbal began traveling throughout Arabia to collect narrations of Muhammad. Ibn al-Jawzi stated Ibn Hanbal had 414 traditionists from whom he narrated from. With this knowledge, he became a leading authority in the field, leaving behind an immense encyclopedia of narrations, al-Musnad. After several years of travel, he returned to Baghdad to study Islamic law under al-Shafi'i, with whom he formed a close bond with.

Ibn Hanbal became a judge in his old age. Through his students, the Hanbali school of jurisprudence was established, which is now most dominant in Saudi Arabia and Qatar. Unlike the other three schools—Hanafi, Maliki, and Shafi'i—the Hanbali school remained largely Athari in its theology.

In addition to his scholastic enterprises, Ibn Hanbal was a soldier in the war frontiers and performed pilgrimage five times in his life, twice on foot.

=== Inquisition ===
Ibn Hanbal is known to have been called before the Mihna of the Abbasid caliph al-Ma'mun, who wanted to assert his religious authority by pressuring scholars to adopt the Mu'tazili doctrine of the Quran being created, rather than uncreated. According to Sunni tradition, Ibn Hanbal was one of the foremost scholars in resisting the caliph's interference and his imposed doctrine. Ibn Hanbal's stance led to the Hanbali school establishing itself firmly as not only a school of jurisprudence, but theology as well.

Because Ibn Hanbal refused to accept the Mu'tazili doctrine, he was imprisoned in Baghdad throughout the reign of al-Ma'mun. In an incident during the rule of al-Ma'mun's successor, al-Mu'tasim, Ibn Hanbal was flogged to unconsciousness; however, this caused great upheaval in Baghdad and forced al-Mu'tasim to release him. After al-Mu'tasim's death, al-Wathiq became caliph and continued his predecessors' policies of enforcing the Mu'tazili doctrine and, in this pursuit, banished Ibn Hanbal from Baghdad. It was only after al-Wathiq's death and the ascent of his brother al-Mutawakkil, who was much more tolerant of the traditional Sunni beliefs, that Ibn Hanbal was welcomed back to Baghdad.

=== Illness and death ===
At the end of his life, Ibn Hanbal became severely ill. His son Salih describes his illness as:

"On the first day of Rabi' al-Awwal in the year 241 AH, my father developed a fever on Tuesday night. I visited him on Wednesday while he was feverish and breathing heavily. I was familiar with his ailment and had taken care of him whenever he fell ill. I asked him, 'Father, what did you break your fast on last night?' He replied, 'On broad bean water.' Then, he attempted to get up and said, 'Take my hand.' I held his hand, but as he reached the restroom, his legs weakened, and he leaned on me for support. Several physicians, all Muslims, visited him. A doctor named Abdul Rahman prescribed for him a roasted gourd to be eaten and its water to be drunk. This was on Tuesday, and he passed away on Friday."

Ibn Hanbal died on Friday, 2 August 855, at the age of 74–75 in Baghdad. He was buried after the afternoon prayer. Historians relate his funeral was attended by 800,000 men and 60,000 women, and 20,000 Christians and Jews converted to Islam on that day. His grave is located in the premises of the Ahmad ibn Hanbal Mosque in al-Rusafa District. It is reported among the people of Baghdad that during the flood of the Tigris in 1937, the remains of Imam Ahmad ibn Hanbal were supposedly relocated to Arif Agha Mosque. However, later historians have doubted the story, stating that it to be erroneous.

=== Will ===
His son Salih read his will to him at his deathbed, which he confirmed.

"In the name of Allah, the Most Gracious, the Most Merciful.

This is what Ahmad ibn Muhammad ibn Hanbal bequeaths. He testifies that there is no god but Allah, alone with no partner, and that Muhammad is His servant and messenger. He sent him with guidance and the true religion to make it prevail over all religions, even if the polytheists dislike it.

He advises his family and relatives who obey him to worship Allah among the worshipers, to praise Him among those who praise, and to be sincere to the Muslim community.

I declare that I am content with Allah as my Lord, with Islam as my religion, and with Muhammad peace and blessings of Allah be upon him as my prophet.

I bequeath to Abdullah ibn Muhammad, known as Fawran, approximately fifty dinars. He is to be trusted in what he claims, and what I owe him shall be settled from the revenue of my house, God willing. Once that is settled, my son Salih’s children—both male and female—are to be given ten dirhams each."

=== Appearance and personality ===
Ibn Hanbal is described as having a good-looking face and a brown complexion. Reports on his height vary, with some describing him as relatively tall while others describe him as of medium height. He used to trim his moustache and dye his beard with unripe non-reddish Henna. His beard is also described as having some black strands. He would wear average garments, reportedly costing around one Dinar. Oftentimes, he is described as wearing a Thawb, with an Ammama. He used to keep extremely clean and was meticulous about his personal Hygiene.

== Views and thought ==
Ibn Hanbal's principal doctrine is what later came to be known as "traditionalist thought," which emphasized the acceptance of only the Quran and hadith as the foundations of orthodox belief. He did, however, believe that it was only a select few who were properly authorized to interpret the sacred texts.

=== Theology ===
==== God ====
Ibn Hanbal understood the perfect definition of God to be that given in the Quran, whence he held that proper belief in God constituted believing in the description which God had given of Himself in the Islamic scripture. To begin with, Ibn Hanbal asserted that God was both Unique and Absolute and absolutely incomparable to anything in the world of His creatures. As for the various divine attributes, Ibn Hanbal believed that all the regular attributes of God, such as hearing, sight, speech, omnipotence, will, wisdom, the vision by the believers on the day of resurrection etc., were to be literally affirmed as "realities" (ḥaqq). As for those attributes called "ambiguous" (mutas̲h̲ābih), such as those which spoke of God's hand, face, throne, and omnipresence, vision by the believers on the day of resurrection, etc. they were to be understood in the same manner. Ibn Hanbal treated those verses in the scriptures with apparently anthropomorphic descriptions as muhkamat (clear) verses; admitting to only a literal meaning.

Furthermore, Ibn Hanbal "rejected the negative theology (taʿṭīl) of the Jahmiyya and their particular allegorizing exegesis (taʾwīl) of the Quran and of tradition, and no less emphatically criticized the anthropomorphism (tas̲h̲bīh) of the Mus̲h̲abbiha, amongst whom he included, in the scope of his polemics, the Jahmiyya as unconscious anthropomorphists." Ibn Hanbal was also a critic of overt and unnecessary speculation in matters of theology; he believed that it was fair to worship God "without the 'mode' of the theologoumena (bilā kayf), and felt it was wise to leave to God the understanding of His own mystery. Thus, Ibn Hanbal became a strong proponent of the bi-lā kayfa formula. This mediating principle allowed the traditionalists to deny ta'wil (figurative interpretations) of the texts while concomitantly affirming the doctrine of the "incorporeal, transcendent deity". Although he argued for literalist meanings of the Qur'anic and prophetic statements about God, Ibn Hanbal was not a fideist and was willing to engage in hermeneutical exercises. The rise of Imam Ahmad ibn Hanbal and the Ashab al-Hadith, whose cause he championed, during the Mihna; would mark the stage for the empowerment and centering of corporealist ideas in the Sunnite orthodoxy.

Ibn Hanbal also recognized "Divine Form (Al-Şūrah)" as a true attribute of God. He disagreed with those speculative theologians who interpreted the Divine Form as something that represents pseudo-divinities such as the sun, moon, stars, etc. For Ibn Hanbal, to deny that God truly has a Form is Kufr (disbelief). He also believed that God created Adam "according to His form". Censuring those who alleged that this was referring to the form of Adam, Ibn Hanbal asserted:

"He who says that Allah created Adam according to the form of Adam, he is a Jahmi (disbeliever). Which form did Adam have before He created him?"

==== The Quran ====
One of Ibn Hanbal's most famous contributions to Sunni thought was the considerable role he played in bolstering the orthodox doctrine of the Quran being the "uncreated Word of God" (kalām Allāh g̲h̲ayr mak̲h̲lūḳ). By "Quran," Ibn Hanbal understood "not just an abstract idea but the Quran with its letters, words, expressions, and ideas—the Quran in all its living reality, whose nature in itself," according to Ibn Hanbal, eluded human comprehension.

==== Taqlid ====
Ibn Hanbal favoured independent reasoning (ijtihad) and rejected blind following (taqlid) in the case of scholars, although he did allow taqlid for laymen and the average Muslim community. His staunch condemnation of taqlid is reported in the treatise Fath al-Majid by Hanbali judge Abd al-Rahman ibn Hasan (1782–1868). Comparing taqlid to polytheism (shirk), Ibn Hanbal states:

"I am amazed at those people who know that a chain of narration is authentic, and yet, in spite of this, they follow the opinion of Sufyan, for God says, 'And let those who oppose the Messenger's commandment beware, lest some fitna should befall them, or a painful torment be inflicted on them.' Do you know what that fitna is? That fitna is shirk. Maybe the rejection of some of his words would cause one to doubt and deviate in his heart, and thereby be destroyed."

It is important to understand that this statement was directed towards his students, who were capable of Ijtihad, and is not meant towards laymen. This statement is explained by Ibn Taymiyya:

"Imam Ahmad deemed it unlawful for a scholar capable of ijtihad to make taqlid of them. He said: “Do not make taqlid of me, nor of Malik, al-Shafi‘i, or al-Thawri” … He instructed the lay people to seek fatwas from Ishaq, Abu ‘Ubayd, Abu Thawr, and Abu Mus‘ab. But he forbade the scholars from among his students – like Abu Dawud, ‘Uthman b. Sa‘id, Ibrahim al-Harbi, Abu Bakr al-Athram, Abu Zur‘ah, Abu Hatim al-Sijistani, Muslim and others – from making taqlid of any other scholar. He would say: “Stick to the basic principle by following the Book and the Sunnah.”

This makes it evident that Ahmad ibn Hanbal’s prohibition of taqlid was intended solely for scholars (Ulama), and he harshly condemned those who rejected the layman’s duty to perform taqlid.

==== Intercession ====
It is narrated by Abū Bakr al-Marwazī in his Mansak that Ibn Hanbal preferred one to make tawassul or "intercession" through Muhammad in every supplication, with the wording: "O God! I am turning to Thee with Thy Prophet, the Prophet of Mercy. O Muhammad! I am turning with you to my Lord for the fulfillment of my need." This report is repeated in many later Hanbali works, in the context of personal supplication as an issue of jurisprudence. Ibn Qudama, for example, recommends it for the obtainment of need in his Wasiyya. In the same way, Ibn Taymiyya cites the Hanbali fatwa on the desirability of Muhammad's intercession in every personal supplication in his Qāida fil-Tawassul wal-Wasiīla where he attributes it to "Imām Ahmad and a group of the pious ancestors" from the Mansak of al-Marwazī as his source.

==== Mysticism ====
As there exist historical sources indicating patently "mystical elements in his personal piety" and documented evidence of his amiable interactions with numerous early Sufi saints, including Maruf Karkhi, it is recognized that Ibn Hanbal's relationship with many of the Sufis was one of mutual respect and admiration. Qadi Abu Ya'la reports in his Tabaqat: "[Ibn Hanbal] used to greatly respect the Sūfīs and show them kindness and generosity. He was asked about them and was told that they sat in mosques constantly, to which he replied, 'Knowledge made them sit.'" Furthermore, it is in Ibn Hanbal's Musnad that we find most of the hadith reports concerning the abdal, forty major saints "whose number [according to Islamic mystical doctrine] would remain constant, one always being replaced by some other on his death" and whose key role in the traditional Sufi conception of the celestial hierarchy would be detailed by later mystics such as Hujwiri and Ibn Arabi. It has been reported that Ibn Hanbal explicitly identified Maruf Karkhi as one of the abdal, saying: "He is one of the Substitute-Saints, and his supplication is answered." Of the same Sufi, Ibn Hanbal later asked rhetorically: "Is religious knowledge anything else than what Maruf has achieved?" Additionally, there are accounts of Ibn Hanbal extolling the early ascetic saint Bishr the Barefoot and his sister as two exceptional devotees of God, and of his sending people with mystical questions to Bishr for guidance. Moreover, there are accounts of Ibn Hanbal's son, Sālih, being exhorted by his father to go and study under the Sufis. According to one tradition, Sālih said: "My father would send for me whenever a self-denier or ascetic (zāhid aw mutaqashshif) visited him so I could look at him. He loved for me to become like this."

As for the Sufis' reception of Ibn Hanbal, it is evident that he was "held in high regard" by all the major Sufis of the classical and medieval periods, and later Sufi chroniclers often designated the jurist as a saint in their hagiographies, praising him both for his legal work and for his appreciation of Sufi doctrine. Hujwiri, for example, wrote of him: "He was distinguished by devoutness and piety ... Sufis of all orders regard him as blessed. He associated with great Shaykhs, such as Dhul-Nun of Egypt, Bishr al-Hafi, Sari al-Saqati, Maruf Karkhi, and others. His miracles were manifest and his intelligence sound ... He had a firm belief in the principles of religion, and his creed was approved by all the [theologians]." Both non-Hanbali and Hanbali Sufi hagiographers such as Hujwiri and Ibn al-Jawzi, respectively, also alluded to Ibn Hanbal's own gifts as a miracle worker and of the blessedness of his grave. For example, Ibn Hanbal's own body was traditionally held to have been blessed with the miracle of incorruptibility, with Ibn al-Jawzi relating: "When the Prophet's descendant Abū Ja'far ibn Abī Mūsā was buried next to him, Ahmad ibn Hanbal's tomb was exposed. His corpse had not putrified and the shroud was still whole and undecayed."

Although there is a perception that Ibn Hanbal or his school were somehow adverse to Sufism, scholars such as Eric Geoffrey have asserted that this opinion is more partial than objective, for there is no proof that the Hanbali school "[attacked] Sufism in itself any more than any other school," and it is evident that "during the first centuries some major Sufis [such as Ibn Ata Allah, Hallaj, and Abdullah Ansari] ... followed the Hanbalite school of law." By the twelfth-century, the relationship between Hanbalism and Sufism was so close that one of the most prominent Hanbali jurists, Abdul Qadir Jilani, was also simultaneously the most famous Sufi of his era, and the Tariqa that he founded, the Qadiriyya, has continued to remain one of the most widespread Sufi orders up until the present day. Even later Hanbali authors who were famous for criticizing some of the "deviances" of certain heterodox Sufi orders of their day, such as Ibn Qudamah, Ibn al-Jawzi, and Ibn Qayyim al-Jawziyya, all belonged to Abdul Qadir Jilani's order themselves, and never condemned Sufism outright.

==== Relics ====
As has been noted by some scholars, it is evident that Ibn Hanbal "believed in the power of relics," and supported the seeking of blessing through them in religious veneration. Several accounts of Ibn Hanbal's life relate that he often carried "a purse ... in his sleeve containing ... hairs from the Prophet." Ibn Hanbal later reportedly ordered that he be buried with Muhammad's hairs he possessed, "one on each eye and a third on his tongue."

Sufi scholar Gibril Haddad reports from al-Dhahabi that Ibn Hanbal "used to seek blessings from the relics of the Prophet." Citing the aforementioned report of Ibn Hanbal's devotion towards Muhammad's hair, al-Dhahabī then goes on to staunchly criticize whoever finds fault with the practices of tabarruk or seeking blessings from holy relics, saying: "Where is the quibbling critic of Imām Ahmad now? It is also authentically established that Abd Allāh [Ibn Hanbal's son] asked his father about those who touch the pommel of Muhammad's pulpit and touch the wall of his room, and he said: 'I do not see any harm in it.' May God protect us and you from the opinion of the dissenters and from innovations!"

According to Twelver Shia writer Najm al-Din Tabasi, when asked by his son Abdullah about the legitimacy of touching and kissing Muhammad's grave in Medina, Ibn Hanbal is said to have approved of both these acts as being permissible according to sacred law.

=== Jurisprudence ===
According to Hanbali scholar Najm al-Din Tufi (d. 716 A.H/ 1316 C.E), Ahmad ibn Hanbal did not formulate a legal theory; since "his entire concern was with hadith and its collection". More than a century after Ahmad's death, Hanbali legalism would emerge as a distinct school; due to the efforts of jurists like Abu Bakr al-Athram (d. 261 A.H/ 874 C.E), Harb al-Kirmani (d. 280 A.H/ 893 C.E), 'Abd Allah ibn Ahmad (d. 290 A.H/903 C.E), Abu Bakr al-Khallal (d. 311 A.H/ 923 C.E) etc., who compiled Ahmad's various legal verdicts.

==== Independent reasoning by muftis ====
Ibn Hanbal also had a strict criterion for ijtihad or independent reasoning in matters of law by muftis and the ulema. One story narrates that Ibn Hanbal was asked by Zakariyyā ibn Yaḥyā al-Ḍarīr about "how many memorized ḥadīths are sufficient for someone to be a mufti [meaning a mujtahid jurist or one capable of issuing independently reasoned fatwas]." According to the narrative, Zakariyyā asked: "Are one-hundred thousand sufficient?" to which Ibn Hanbal responded in the negative, with Zakariyyā asking if two-hundred thousand were, to which he received the same response from the jurist. Thus, Zakariyyā kept increasing the number until, at five-hundred thousand, Ibn Hanbal said: "I hope that that should be sufficient." As a result, it has been argued that Ibn Hanbal disapproved of independent reasoning by those muftis who were not absolute masters in law and jurisprudence.

==== Misusing ahadith ====
Ibn Hanbal narrated from Muḥammad ibn Yaḥyā al-Qaṭṭān that the latter said: "If someone were to follow every rukhṣa [dispensation] that is in the ḥadīth, he would become a transgressor (fāsiq)." It is believed that he quoted this on account of the vast number of forged traditions of Muhammad.

==== Private interpretation ====
Ibn Hanbal appears to have been a formidable opponent of "private interpretation," and actually held that it was only the religious scholars who were qualified to properly interpret the holy texts. One of the creeds attributed to Ibn Hanbal opens with: "Praise be to God, who in every age and interval between prophets (fatra) elevated learned men possessing excellent qualities, who call upon him who goes astray (to return) to the right way." It has been pointed out that this particular creed "explicitly opposes the use of personal judgement (raʾy) ... [as basis] of jurisprudence."

=== Ethics ===
==== Differences of opinion ====
Ibn Hanbal was praised both in his own life and afterwards for his "serene acceptance of juridical divergences among the various schools of Islamic law". According to later notable scholars of the Hanbali school like Ibn Aqil and Ibn Taymiyya, Ibn Hanbal "considered every madhhab correct and abhorred that a jurist insist people follow his even if he considered them wrong and even if the truth is one in any given matter." As such, when Ibn Hanbal's student Ishāq ibn Bahlūl al-Anbārī had "compiled a book on juridical differences ... which he had named The Core of Divergence (Lubāb al-Ikhtilāf)," Ibn Hanbal advised him to name the work The Book of Leeway (Kitāb al-Sa'a) instead.

== Works ==
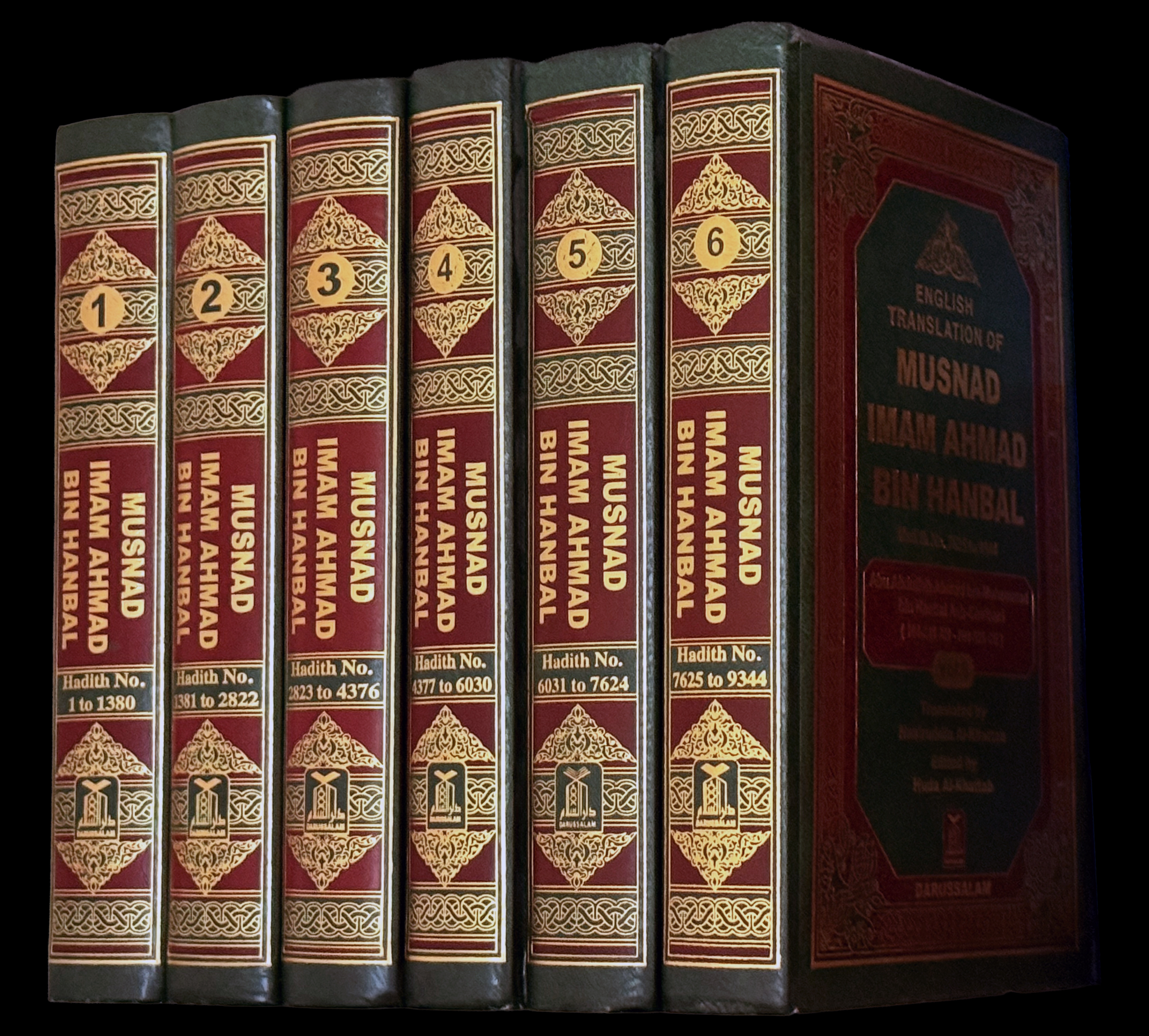
English translation of Ibn Hanbal's most famous work, Musnad Ahmad ibn Hanbal.

The following books are found in Ibn al-Nadim's Fihrist:

- Usool as-Sunnah: "Foundations of the Prophetic Tradition (in Belief)"
- as-Sunnah: "The Prophet Tradition (in Belief)"
- Kitab al-`Ilal wa Ma'rifat al-Rijal: "The Book of Narrations Containing Hidden Flaws and of Knowledge of the Men (of Hadeeth)"
- Kitab al-Manasik: "The Book of the Rites of Hajj"
- Kitab al-Zuhd: "The Book of Abstinence"
- Kitab al-Iman: "The Book of Faith"
- Kitab al-Masa'il: "Issues in Fiqh"
- Kitab al-Ashribah: "The Book of Drinks"
- Kitab al-Fada'il Sahaba: "Virtues of the Companions"
- Kitab Tha'ah al-Rasul: "The Book of Obedience to the Messenger"
- Kitab Mansukh: "The Book of Abrogation"
- Kitab al-Fara'id: "The Book of Obligatory Duties"
- Kitab al-Radd `ala al-Zanadiqa wa'l-Jahmiyya: "Refutations of the Heretics and the Jahmites"
- Tafsir: "Exegesis"
- Musnad Ahmad ibn Hanbal

== Historical views ==
Ibn Hanbal has been extensively praised for both his work in the field of prophetic tradition (hadith), jurisprudence, and his defense of orthodox Sunni theology.

=== Jurisprudence ===
There have some alleged views that his juristic views were not always accepted. Qur'anic exegete Muhammad ibn Jarir al-Tabari, who at one time had sought to study under Ibn Hanbal, reportedly stated that he did not consider Ibn Hanbal a jurist and gave his views in the field no weight, describing him as an expert in prophetic tradition only. However, during this time Ibn Hanbal's school was still at its infancy and has not amassed a large following compared to the other schools, and its students had conflict with Al-Tabari's school. Consider how the Masa'il of Imam Ahmad, i.e. the first written compilation of Ibn Hanbal's question and answers, was written by Abu Bakr al-Khallal who lived around the same time as Al-Tabari, and the first written compilation of Ibn Hanbal's fiqh was Al-Khiraqi who also lived around that same time. The more systematic teaching of Ibn Hanbal's jurisprudence in education facilities only occurred after that point.

Likewise, the Andalusian scholar Ibn 'Abd al-Barr did not include Ibn Hanbal or his views in his book The Hand-Picked Excellent Merits of the Three Great Jurisprudent Imâms about the main representatives of Sunni jurisprudence. However, Ibn 'Abd al-Barr has praised Ibn Hanbal's jurisprudence by saying "He is very powerful in the fiqh of the madhab of the ahl al-hadith and he is the Imam of the 'ulama of ahl al-hadith."

However, the vast majority of other scholars do recognize Ibn Hanbal's prowess as a master jurist worthy of one, whose methodology became foundation for its own school of jurisprudence. Imam Shafi'i said, "Ahmad is an Imam in eight fields: he is an imam in hadith, jurisprudence, Al-Qur'an, Al-Lughah, Al-Sunnah, Al-Zuhd, Al-Warak, and Al-Faqr". Al-Dhahabi, one of the most major Islamic biographers, notes in his work Siyar A'lam Nubala, that Ibn Hanbal's status in jurisprudence is alike of Al-Layth ibn Sa'd, Malik ibn Anas, Al-Shafi'i, and Abu Yusuf. Muhammad Abu Zahra, a contemporary Hanafi scholar, wrote a book titled Ibn Hanbal: Hayatuhu wa `Asruhu Ara'uhu wa Fiqhuh. The book highlights the high praise accorded to Ibn Hanbal and his school of jurisprudence by numerous classical scholars.

=== Hadith ===
It is reported that Ibn Hanbal has reached the title of al Hafidh of Hadith according to Jamal al-Din al-Mizzi classification, as the title bestowment were approved by Ibn Hajar al-Asqalani that Ibn Hanbal has memorized at least 750,000 hadith during his life, more than Muhammad al-Bukhari and Muslim ibn al-Hajjaj who each memorized 300,000 hadith, and Abu Dawud al-Sijistani who memorized 500,000 hadith. Abu Zur'ah mentions that Ibn Hanbal has memorized 1,000,000 hadith, 700,000 among them are related to jurisprudence.

While according to the classification from Marfu' Hadith of Ibn Abbas which recorded by Al-Tabarani, Ibn Hanbal has reached the rank of Amir al-Mu'minin al-Hadith, a rank that only reached by very few Hadith scholars in history such as Malik ibn Anas, Yahya ibn Ma'in, Hammad ibn Salamah, Ibn al-Mubarak, and Al-Suyuti. Ibn Hanbal's Musnad is not, however, ranked among the Kutub al-Sittah, the six big collections of hadith.

== Legacy ==
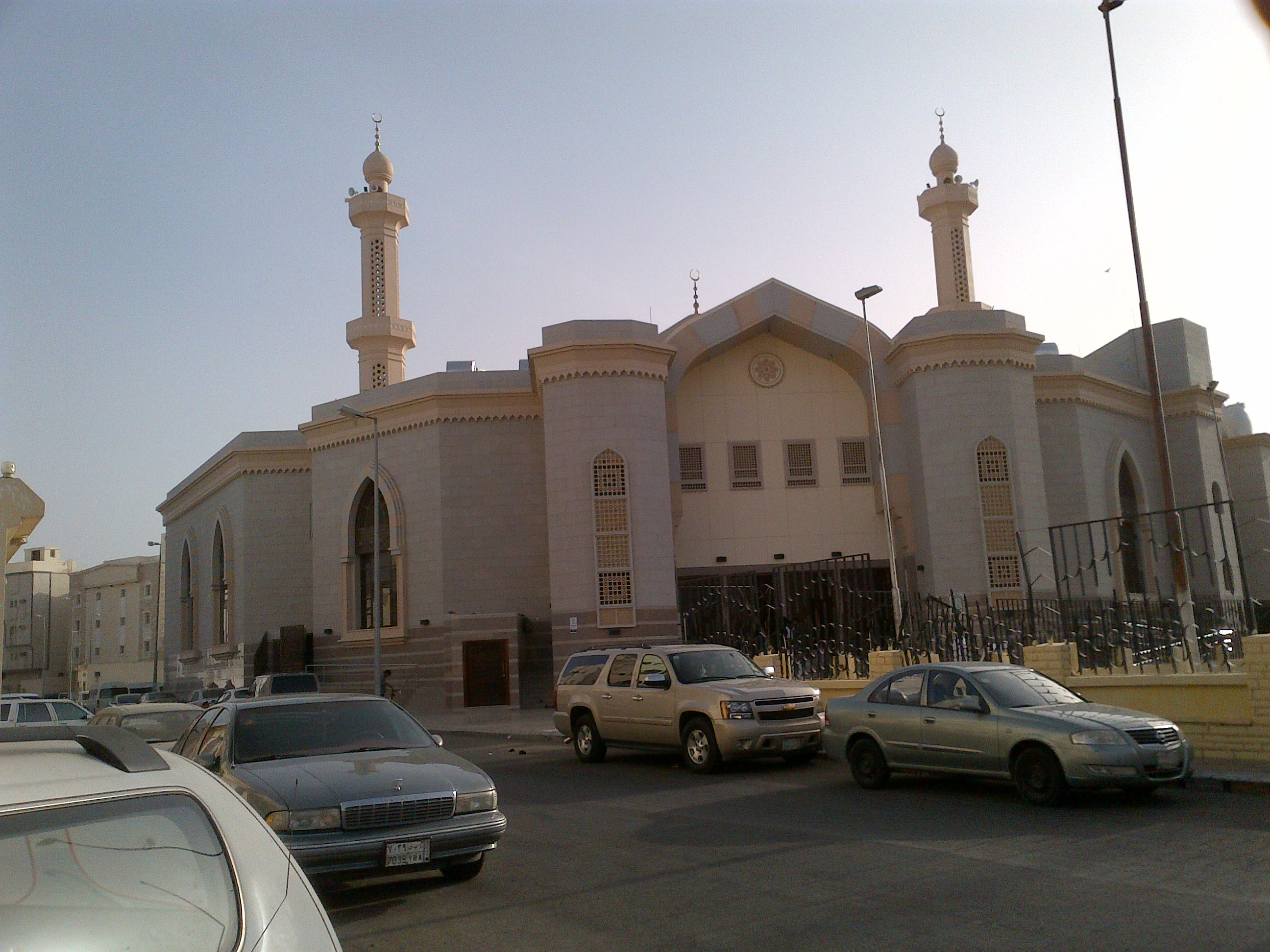
Ahmad Ibn Hanbal Mosque in Medina, Saudi Arabia named after him.

Ahmad Ibn Hanbal is described as "one of the most venerated" intellectual figures in Islamic history, and one of the "fathers of Islam". During ninth century, he became a defining figure for Sunnism. People would assert as a badge of orthodoxy that their creed was same as Ahmad's. Tunisian-born scholar and journalist Abdelwahab Meddeb credits Ahmad ibn Hanbal with originating the belief that the Rashidun Caliphate was uniquely deserving of emulation—a century after the end of that dynasty.

His school of thought, Hanbali school is dominant in Saudi Arabia and Qatar. During early 20th century, it became the official legal school in Saudi Arabia, although in recent decades, there has been a gradual shift in the Saudi judiciary, with judges also increasingly incorporating opinions from other Sunni schools of jurisprudence.

=== In popular culture ===
- Ahmad ibn Hanbal was largely depicted in Qatar TV's 2017 Ramadan drama serial "The Imam" starring Mahyar Khaddour in the lead role.

== See also ==
- Ibn 'Ulayya
- Ash'ari
- Athari
- Maturidi
- Hanbali
- Malik ibn Anas
- Maliki
- Abu Hanifa
- Hanafi
- Al-Shafiʽi
- Shafiʽi school
