= Najm al-Din Tabasi =

Iranian Ayatollah (b. 1955)

- Title: Ayatollah

Personal life
- Born: 1955 (age 70–71)
- Era: Modern era
- Region: Iran

Religious life
- Religion: Islam
- Jurisprudence: Shia Islam
- Website: http://velaseddighah.com/fa

Najmeddin Ṭabasī (Persian: نجم الدین طبسی، born 1955) (complete name: Najmeddin Moraveji Tabasi) is an Iranian Twelver Shia cleric. He was born in Najaf and is a member of Society of Seminary Teachers of Qom.

== Life ==
Najm al-Din Tabasi (also known as Najm al-Din Murawwiji Tabasi) is son of Mohammad Rida Tabasi who was born in Najaf. He pursued his education in hawza by taking classes of scholars like:

Sayyid Muhammad Rida Gulpayigani, Ali Panah Ishtihardi, Ja'far Subhani, Sayyid Ali Muhaqqiq Damad, Husayn Nuri Hamadani, Muhsin Haram Panahi, Mohammad Reza Golpaygani, Husayn Wahid Khurasani and Fadil Harandi.

Najm al-Din Tabasi is currently a member of:

- Shoraye Elmie Marakeze Takhasosi Mahdaviat (Scientific Council of the Specialized Center on Mahdawiyyat);
- Educational Research Institute of Mazahebi-Eslami (Islamic religions);
- Specialty Center of Tarbiyate-Mohaqeqe Mazahebi-Eslami (Researcher Training of Islamic Religions)

== Works ==
He has authored scores of articles and books including:

1. Al-Imam al-Husayn fi Makkah al-Mukarramah
2. Ta Zuhur
3. Nishanaha-yi az Dawlat-e Maw'ud
4. Chashm Andazi be Hukumat-e Mahdi
5. Sawm 'Ashura Bayn al-Sunna wa al-Bid'a
6. Raj'at az Nazar-e Shi'a
7. Dajjal, Chirayi-ye Girya wa Sugwari
8. Ta'ammuli nu dar Nishaniha-ye Zuhur
9. Nigarishi dar Sufyani
10. Manaqib al-Shaykhayn fi al-Tafsir wa al-Hadith
11. Sayyid Hasani dar Khutbat al-Bayan
12. Nigarishi dar Riwayat-e Sayyid Hasani.
13. Rahbare Azadegan
14. Nazame Artesh Dar Eslam
15. Tabeed Dar Eslam
16. Ferqeyi Baraye Tafraqe
