= Abu al-Fadl Muhammad al Tabasi =

Sunni Islamic author based in Nishapur (died 1089)

Tabasi
- تاباسي

Personal life
- Died: 1089
- Era: Islamic Golden Age
- Region: Nishapur
- Main interest(s): Sufism, theology (kalam), Islamic jurisprudence, Principles of Islamic jurisprudence, Occultism (ʿUlūm al-Ghayb)
- Notable work: al-Shāmil fī al-baḥr al-kāmil

Religious life
- Religion: Islam
- Denomination: Sunni
- School: Shafi'i
- Creed: Ash'ari

Muslim leader
- Influenced by: al-Hallaj; ibn Hilal; al-Farabi; Avicenna
- Influenced: Fakhr al-Din al-Razi; Al-Ghazali

Abu al-Fadl Muhammad al Tabasi (died 1089) was a Shafi‘i Muslim and Sufi Asharite author who lived most of his life in Nishapur. He was a respected religious authority and hold several lectures in his region.

Although many works are associated with him, his al-Shāmil fī al-baḥr al-kāmil (The Comprehensive Compendium to the Entire Sea), a treatise about conjuring demons and jinn, seems to be most disseminated. Distinguishing between licit and illicit magic, he activates the spells by invoking the names of angels, prophets and cites Islamic sacred scriptures such as the Torah, the Gospel and certain Quranic verses, regarding such occult practises as in accordance with Islamic law, as long it is performed by virtues and not by sin.

He was famous for his alleged own ability to subjugate jinn, as reported by encyclopedist and scholar of natural scientist Zakariya al-Qazwini.
