= Job 26 =

26th chapter of the Book of Job

- ← chapter 25 chapter 27 →
- The whole Book of Job in the Leningrad Codex (1008 C.E.) from an old facsimile edition.
- Book: Book of Job
- Hebrew Bible part: Ketuvim
- Order in the Hebrew part: 3
- Category: Sifrei Emet
- Christian Bible part: Old Testament
- Order in the Christian part: 18

Job 26 is the 26th chapter of the Book of Job in the Hebrew Bible or the Old Testament of the Christian Bible. The book is anonymous; most scholars believe it was written around 6th century BCE. This chapter records the speech of Job, which belongs to the Dialogue section of the book, comprising Job 3:1–31:40.

== Text ==
The original text is written in Hebrew language. This chapter is divided into 14 verses.

=== Textual witnesses ===
Some early manuscripts containing the text of this chapter in Hebrew are of the Masoretic Text, which includes the Aleppo Codex (10th century), and Codex Leningradensis (1008).

There is also a translation into Koine Greek known as the Septuagint, made in the last few centuries BCE; some extant ancient manuscripts of this version include Codex Vaticanus (B; $\mathfrak{G}$^{B}; 4th century), Codex Sinaiticus (S; BHK: $\mathfrak{G}$^{S}; 4th century), and Codex Alexandrinus (A; $\mathfrak{G}$^{A}; 5th century).

== Analysis ==
The structure of the book is as follows:

- The Prologue (chapters 1–2)
- The Dialogue (chapters 3–31)
- The Verdicts (32:1–42:6)
- The Epilogue (42:7–17)

Within the structure, chapter 26 is grouped into the Dialogue section with the following outline:

- Job's Self-Curse and Self-Lament (3:1–26)
- Round One (4:1–14:22)
- Round Two (15:1–21:34)
- Round Three (22:1–27:23)
  - Eliphaz (22:1–30)
  - Job (23:1–24:25)
  - Bildad (25:1–6)
  - Job (26:1–27:23)
    - A Strong Rebuke of the Friends (26:1–4)
    - Praise for God's Majestic Power (26:5–14)
    - Insisting on His Integrity (27:1–6)
    - Offering to Instruct the Wicked (27:7–12)
    - The Fate of the Wicked (27:13–23)
  - Interlude – A Poem on Wisdom (28:1–28)
- Job's Summing Up (29:1–31:40)

The Dialogue section is composed in the format of poetry with distinctive syntax and grammar. Comparing the three cycles of debate, the third (and final) round can be seen as 'incomplete', because there is no speech from Zophar and the speech by Bildad is very short (6 verses only), which may indicate as a symptom of disintegration of the friends' arguments. Job's final speech in the third cycle of debate mainly comprises chapters 26 to 27, but in the silence of his friends, Job continues his speech until chapter 31. Chapter 26 can be divided into two parts:

1. Job's rebuke to his friends: rejection to Bildad's arguments (verses 1–4)
2. Job's praise for God's majectic power (verses 5–14)

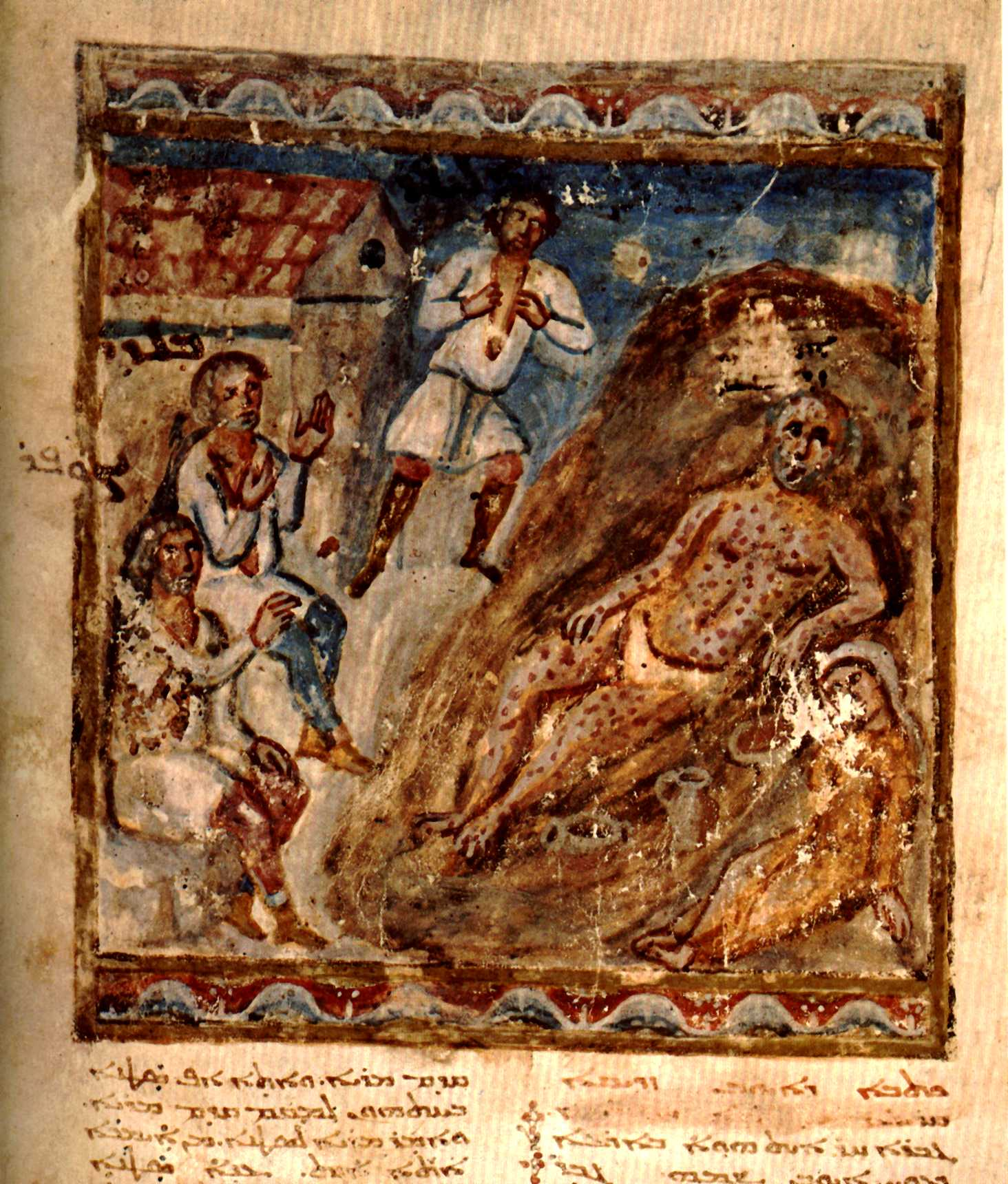
"Job, with his wife and his three friends". From: Folio 46r from the Syriac Bible of Paris (Bibliothèque Nationale, MS syr. 341).

== Job rebukes his friends (26:1–4) ==
Job focuses the first part of his speech to challenge Bildad's arguments by asking him to show how Bildad has helped someone who has no power nor strength (verse 2), or advised someone who has no wisdom, or caused anyone to experience abundant success; all of these evoke no answer from Bildad. Job previously clarifies that wisdom, power and strength belong to God (Job 12:13–16), but none of these was in Bildad's speeches. The allusion in verse 4 refers to Eliphaz's words in Job 4:15, which were echoed by Bildad in his last speech (Job 25:4), implying that none of these statements came from God or reliable sources. At this point, Job ceases to address his friends and focuses his attention to the character of God.

=== Verse 4 ===
[Job said:] "To whom have you uttered words?

And whose spirit came from you?"

- "To whom": translated from the Hebrew preposition and the interrogative אֶת־מִי, ʾet mi, which can be translated as "with who[se help]?", or if taken as an accusative particle introducing the indirect object, can be rendered as "for whom did you utter…".
- "Came from you": in Hebrew literally "has gone out from you.".

== Job praises God's majestic power (26:5–14) ==
This section contains Job's praise to God, emphasizing his belief in the big view of God controlling his world, although he cannot understand how his suffering can be part of God's good plan. God's authority covers even the dead people, which cannot hide from God (explained using three different terms for the dead: "shades/ghost" (verse 5a; cf. Proverbs 2:18; 9:18; Psalm 88:10), "Sheol" (verse 6a, "place of the dead") and "Abaddon" (verse 6b, "the place of destruction")). God also controls the mythological forces of chaos, such as "Rahab" (verse 12b; cf. Job 9:13) and the fleeing serpent (verse 13b), in anticipation of YHWH's second speech (chapters 40–41). Job knows that his knowledge of God is so little (just the "outskirts" or like a "whisper" (verse 14).

=== Verse 14 ===
[Job said:] "Behold, these are but the outskirts of his ways,

and how small a whisper do we hear of him!
But the thunder of his power who can understand?"

- "The outskirts of his ways": in Hebrew literally "the ends of his ways", referring to "the fringes".
- "How small a whisper": in Hebrew literally "how little is the word"; with "little" here meaning a "fraction" or an "echo".

== See also ==
- Divine judgment
- Heaven
- Ruach HaKodesh (Holy Spirit in Judaism)
- Sheol
- Related Bible parts: Genesis 1, Job 4, Job 9, Job 14, Job 15.

== Sources ==
- Alter, Robert (2010). The Wisdom Books: Job, Proverbs, and Ecclesiastes: A Translation with Commentary. W.W. Norton & Co. ISBN 978-0393080735.
- Coogan, Michael David (2007). Coogan, Michael David; Brettler, Marc Zvi; Newsom, Carol Ann; Perkins, Pheme (eds.). The New Oxford Annotated Bible with the Apocryphal/Deuterocanonical Books: New Revised Standard Version, Issue 48 (Augmented 3rd ed.). Oxford University Press. ISBN 9780195288810.
- Crenshaw, James L. (2007). "17. Job". In Barton, John; Muddiman, John (eds.). The Oxford Bible Commentary (first (paperback) ed.). Oxford University Press. pp. 331–355. ISBN 978-0199277186.
- Estes, Daniel J. (2013). Walton, John H.; Strauss, Mark L. (eds.). Job. Teach the Text Commentary Series. United States: Baker Publishing Group. ISBN 9781441242778.
- Farmer, Kathleen A. (1998). "The Wisdom Books". In McKenzie, Steven L.; Graham, Matt Patrick (eds.). The Hebrew Bible Today: An Introduction to Critical Issues. Westminster John Knox Press. ISBN 978-0-66425652-4.
- Halley, Henry H. (1965). Halley's Bible Handbook: an abbreviated Bible commentary (24th (revised) ed.). Zondervan Publishing House. ISBN 0-310-25720-4.
- Kugler, Robert; Hartin, Patrick J. (2009). An Introduction to the Bible. Eerdmans. ISBN 978-0-8028-4636-5.
- Walton, John H. (2012). Job. United States: Zondervan. ISBN 9780310492009.
- Wilson, Lindsay (2015). Job. United States: Wm. B. Eerdmans Publishing Company. ISBN 9781467443289.
- Würthwein, Ernst (1995). The Text of the Old Testament. Translated by Rhodes, Erroll F. Grand Rapids, MI: Wm. B. Eerdmans. ISBN 0-8028-0788-7.
