= Sheol =

Underworld in the Hebrew Bible

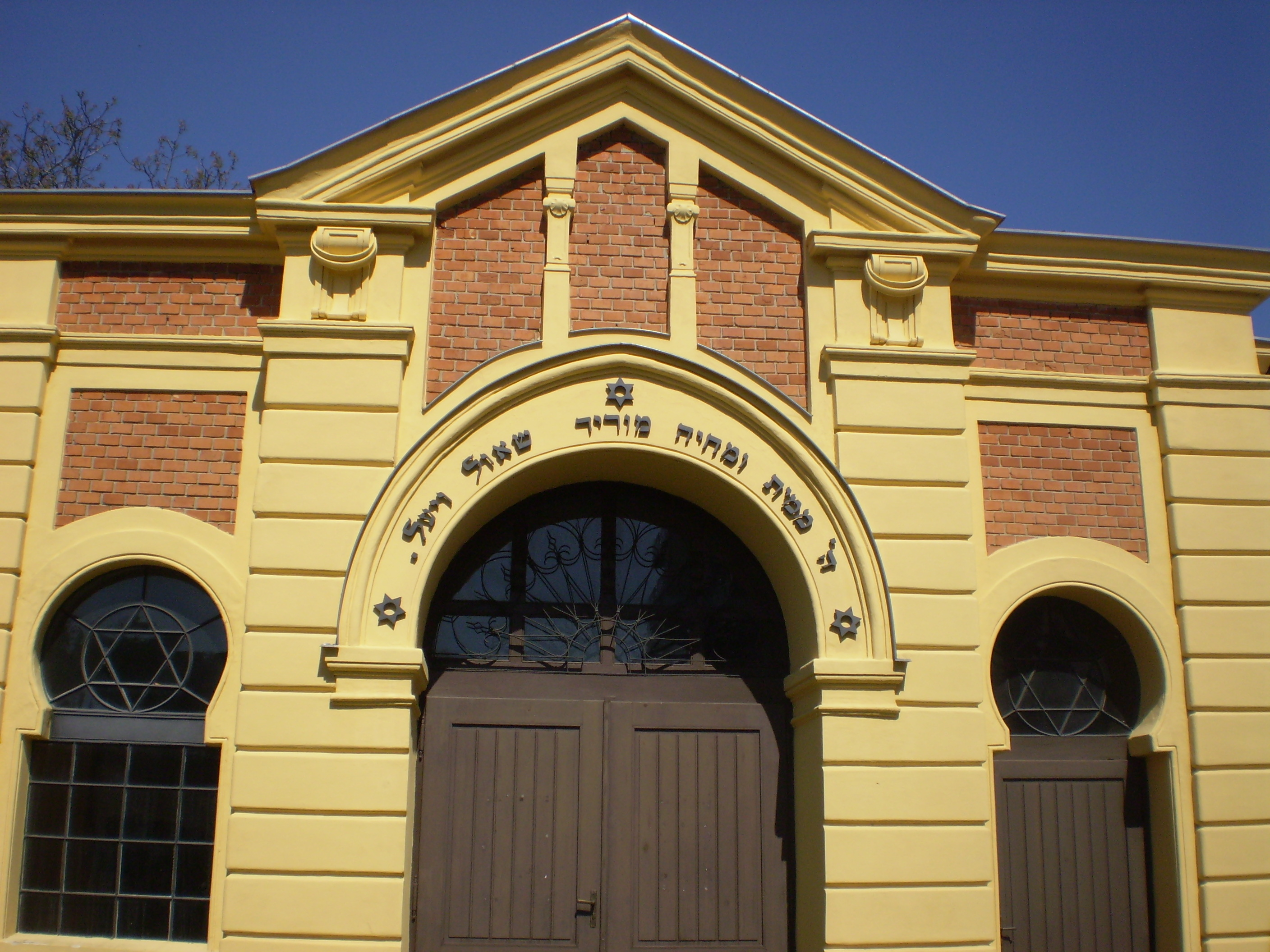
Biblical text on a synagogue in Holešov, Czech Republic: "HaShem kills and makes alive; He brings down to Sheol and raises up." (1 Samuel 2:6)

Sheol (Biblical Hebrew: שְׁאוֹל, romanized: Šəʾōl; Tiberian Hebrew: Šŏʾōl) in the Hebrew Bible is the underworld, or the unseen world of the dead to which departed spirits go. It was said to be a place of stillness and darkness in the subterranean regions. The state of existence is shadowy and silent, where the inhabitants are in weakened forms having an inactive remnant of humanity. The word 'Sheol' is almost exclusive to the Old Testament, with exception in Elephantine papyri from the Jewish community residing in southern Egypt. Its etymology is contested and considered to be unknown. However, propositions that have scholarly support include potential roots in Hebrew words meaning 'be desolate' or 'desolate place', or a link to Akkadian loanwords from the goddess Shuwala.

Within the Hebrew Bible, there are few—often brief and nondescript—mentions of Sheol, seemingly describing it as a place where both the righteous and the unrighteous dead go, regardless of their moral choices in life. The implications of Sheol within the texts are therefore somewhat unclear; it may be interpreted as either a generic metaphor describing "the grave" into which all humans invariably descend, or an actual state of afterlife within Israelite thought. Though such practices are forbidden, the inhabitants of Sheol can, under some circumstances, be summoned by the living, as when the Witch of Endor calls up the spirit of Samuel for King Saul.

While the Hebrew Bible appears to describe Sheol as the permanent place of the dead, in the Second Temple period (c. 500 BCE – 70 CE), a more diverse set of ideas developed. In some texts, Sheol is considered the home of both the righteous and the wicked, separated into respective compartments; in others, it was considered a place of punishment meant for the wicked dead alone. When the Hebrew scriptures were translated into Greek in ancient Alexandria (c. 200 BCE), the word "Hades" (i.e., the Greek underworld) was substituted for Sheol owing to its similarities to the Underworld of Greek mythology. The gloss of Sheol as "Hades" is reflected in the New Testament, wherein Hades is both the underworld of the dead and the personification of the evil it represents.

In the English translations of Old Testament, the instances of word "Sheol" is usually replaced with Hell, or with synonyms of word "death", as in the example of Job 14:13 where King james Version (KJV) replaces the word "Sheol" with the word "grave".

== Hebrew Bible ==
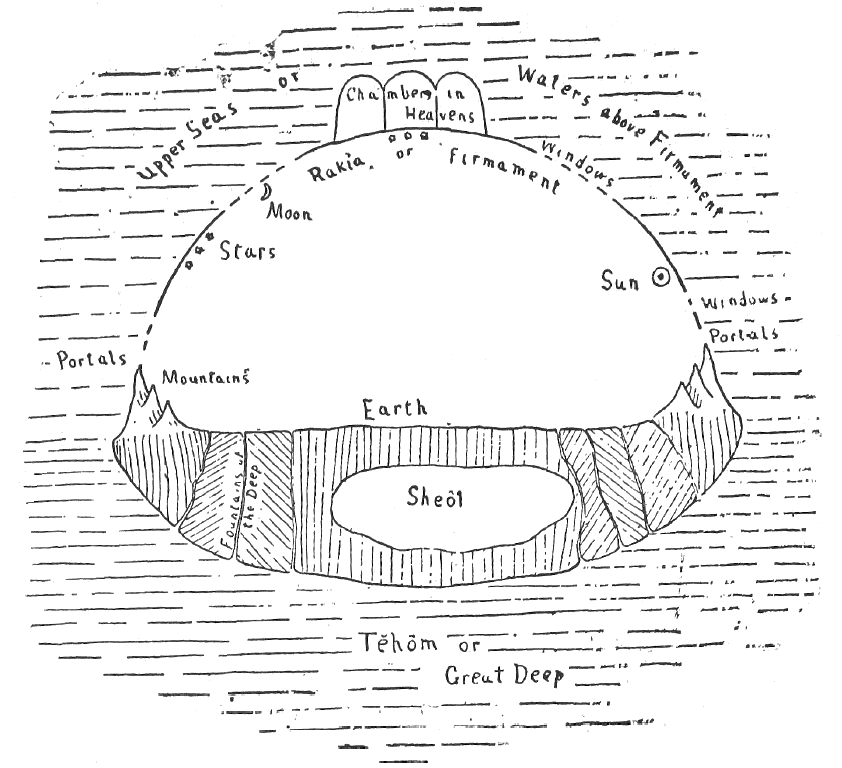
Sheol in ancient Hebrew conceptions of the Universe, illustration by historian Ralph V. Chamberlin in 1909. Both the Deep and underworld were located beneath the earth, but the abode of the dead was situated above the waters.

Sheol is mentioned 66 times throughout the Hebrew Bible. The first mentions of Sheol within the text associate it with the state of death and a sense of eternal finality. Jacob avows that he will "go down to Sheol," still mourning the apparent death of his son Joseph. Later in the book of Genesis, the same formula is repeated when describing the sorrow that would befall Jacob should another of his sons, Benjamin, not return to him with his remaining brothers.

Sheol makes its next appearance during the episode of Korah in the book of Numbers. After Korah attempts to rouse the Israelites to rebel against Moses, Moses vows that Yahweh will prove his legitimacy by splitting open the earth to hurl Korah and his conspirators into Sheol. Sure enough, as he finishes his speech, Yahweh splits the earth open, causing Korah, his family, and all of his possessions to, as the text describes it, "enter Sheol alive." In the book of Deuteronomy, Moses sings that the anger of Yahweh is a flame which burns in the "depths" of Sheol, consuming the entire earth from the bottom up. Subsequent mentions of Sheol in the Tanakh depict it as a representation of death, suggesting that entry into Sheol is an unavoidable consequence of dying. 1 Samuel describes Yahweh as the one who brings souls down to Sheol, and 2 Samuel further cements Sheol as humanity's ultimate postmortem destination. 1 Kings uses "going down to Sheol" as a metaphor for death, describing those who go down to it both "in peace" and "in blood."

The prophet Isaiah expounds on Sheol at great length during some of his sermons, personifying it as possessing an ever-increasing hunger for living people, with a great propensity for the souls of sinners, and where pleas to Yahweh cannot escape. Ezekiel, during his prophecy of Egypt's downfall, describes Egypt metaphorically descending into Sheol as a dead person would, where all the spirits of the dead, as well as other fallen empires, such as Assyria, jeer and mock its fall from might. The remaining mentions of Sheol lie in the poetic literature of the Hebrew Bible. Job mentions Sheol in several of his laments, calling it his "home" as he lies in anguish, and yearning for death to take him there to put an end to his suffering. Sheol is also mentioned in several Psalms—again, as the grave of humanity.

Other biblical names for Sheol were ’Ăḇaddōn (אֲבַדּוֹן, 'ruin'), found in Psalm 88:11, Job 28:22 and Proverbs 15:11 and Šaḥaṯ (שַחַת, 'corruption'), found in Isaiah 38:17 and Ezekiel 28:8. The synonyms for Sheol included terms for 'pit' (bôr, b'ēr, šaḥaṯ) and 'destruction' (ăḇaddôn) which are used in similar contexts when referencing the underworld. Figures in the Bible that may have theophoric name associations with it include Methushael and Mishael.

== Interpretation ==
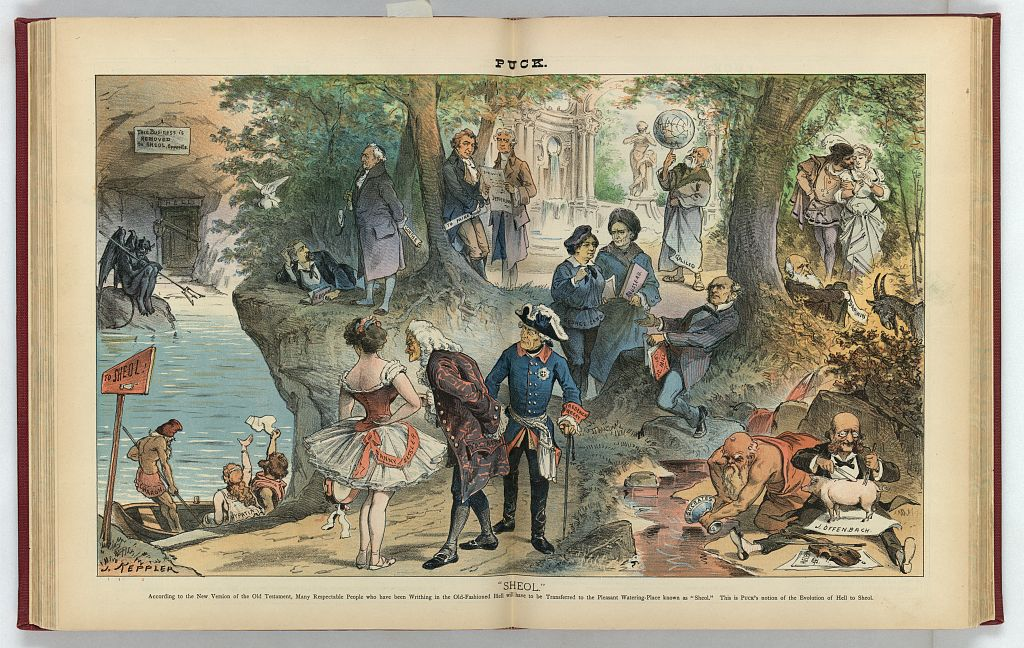
Puck cartoon of 1885 parodying the changing interpretation of Sheol in the Hebrew Bible (Old Testament): a number of historical sinners and atheists are seen enjoying the relatively pleasant atmosphere of "Sheol" after suffering the flames of the traditional Hell; at left is a dejected Satan sitting beneath a sign that states "This Business is Removed to Sheol, Opposite."

Even within early Jewish thought, the understanding of Sheol was often inconsistent. This would partly manifest in the ideological rift between the Sadducees and Pharisees, who disagreed on whether relevance should focus more on the world of the living or on the afterlife. The lack of a clear belief structure surrounding Sheol provides leeway for interpretational pluralism—namely, one that imagines Sheol as a concrete state of the afterlife or one that envisions Sheol as a metaphor for death as a whole. To the latter's end, certain editions of the Bible translate the term Sheol as generic terms such as "grave" or "pit" (e.g., the Christian KJV and NIV and Jewish JPS Tanakh), while others (e.g., the Christian NAB and NASB and Jewish Koren Jerusalem Bible) preserve it as a proper noun. Distinguishing Sheol between a realm and a metaphor is the crux of several unanswered questions surrounding its nature. Biblical literature uses varied imagery for Sheol—such as a watery abyss, a subterranean realm, an abandoned place, or a tomb. Matthew Suriano argues that Iron Age Judahite rock-cut family tombs shaped such visualizations, with Sheol also serving as a metaphor for the liminal phase of bodily decay, before the secondary burial of bones in the shared ancestral repository.

Perhaps owing to the evolution of its interpretation, some aspects of Sheol as described in the Hebrew Bible appear contradictory. Those in Sheol remember nothing, not even Yahweh, yet elsewhere its inhabitants possess an otherwise impossible perception of earthly events, even those which occur after their demise. Pleas to Yahweh cannot escape Sheol, and yet, Yahweh remains its unequivocal master. Those who descend into Sheol cannot escape it, yet Yahweh raises souls from it. Furthermore, despite the evidently abstract nature of Sheol, there is some physicality to it: it was clearly understood to be subterranean, which is further supported by its association with the term bōr (בור, 'pit'), found in Isaiah 14:15 and 24:22 and Ezekiel 26:20. It is a "land" (eretz), contains bolted "gates", is apparently compartmentalized, and there are numerous mentions of its "deepest depths" and "farthest corners". The idea that both the righteous and unrighteous eventually descend to Sheol appears to be an unspoken assumption in the Hebrew Bible; thus, Jacob and David have no reservation in acknowledging their eventual residency, even as the later prophets spoke of Sheol lying in wait for the wicked.

The origins of the concept of Sheol are debated. The general characteristics of an afterlife such as Sheol were not unique to the ancient Israelites; the Babylonians had a similar underworld called Aralu, the Egyptians Duat, and the Greeks had one known as Hades. As such, it is assumed that the early Israelites believed that the grave of family, or tribe, all united into one, collectively unified "grave", and that this is what the Biblical Hebrew term Sheol refers to: the common grave of humans. Therefore, the family tomb is the central concept in understanding biblical views of the afterlife. It is "not mere sentimental respect for the physical remains that is...the motivation for the practice, but rather an assumed connection between proper sepulture and the condition of happiness of the deceased in the afterlife".

Wojciech Kosior has argued that "Sheol" in the Hebrew Bible refers to an underworld deity. Some additional support for this hypothesis comes from the ancient Near Eastern literary materials. It has been proposed that Sheol is the Hebrew derivative of Shuwala (Akkadian: 𒋗𒉿𒆷, šu-wa-la), an underworld goddess of Hurrian origin, attested in Hattusa in Anatolia, Emar and Ugarit in Syria, and Ur in Mesopotamia, often alongside other underworld deities such as Allani or Ugur. According to Assyriologist Lluis Feliu, a connection between Sheol and Shuwala is "possible, but not certain." Edward Lipiński regards this connection as proven, noting Shuwala was progressively depersonalized alongside the feminine gender of the term being translated in Hellenistic times to Hades. Some scholars argue that Sheol understood anthropomorphically fits the semantic complex of the other ancient Near Eastern death deities such as Nergal, Ereshkigal or Mot. The Hebrew word for 'death' is mavet, which shares a common root with Mot. It is therefore argued that in such references where Mavet and Sheol were paired together, they are actual personages whom can be collaborated with (Isaiah 28:15, Isaiah 28:18), and the Biblical netherworld may have been ruled by at least one god, or possibly a goddess.

Gönke Eberhardt posits that differing views in scripture regarding the remoteness of the Israelite God to the underworld can be explained from the history of their religion, with Yahweh originally being a deity of the living who had no dealings with the dead, and neither the underworld. It was instead a realm remote from him, yet "ruled" by other gods, ancestors, and such supernatural agents. The conceptions of the underworld then became extended only during the post-exilic era due to trends of universalization.

The Second Temple Period wrought several radical theological changes within the Israelite population and marked the transition from Israelite religion to modern Judaism. The idea of Sheol underwent extensive modification and became widely diversified, with a newfound plethora of interpretations. With the codification of Rabbinical Judaism and the Talmud, Jewish theology concerning the afterlife had largely abandoned the concept of a single destination for all humankind after death. It adopted the more recognizable model, which espoused a place of reward for the righteous and punishment for the wicked called Gehinnom. Subsequently, Sheol and the related terms Abaddon, Bor, Shakhat, and others were reduced to synonyms for this realm of punishment.

== Mandaeism ==
In Mandaeism, the World of Darkness (i.e., the underworld) is sometimes referred to as Sheol (šiul) in the Ginza Rabba and other Mandaean scriptures.

== See also ==
- Ancient Mesopotamian underworld
- Barzakh
- Biblical cosmology
- Christian views on Hades
- Eirene (goddess)
- Hel (being)
- Hellenistic Judaism
- Limbo of the Patriarchs
- Rephaim
- Shalim
- Spirit world (Latter Day Saints)
- Tartarus
- World of Darkness (Mandaeism)
- Xibalba
