= Job 29 =

29th chapter of the Book of Job

- ← chapter 28 chapter 30 →
- The whole Book of Job in the Leningrad Codex (1008 C.E.) from an old facsimile edition.
- Book: Book of Job
- Hebrew Bible part: Ketuvim
- Order in the Hebrew part: 3
- Category: Sifrei Emet
- Christian Bible part: Old Testament
- Order in the Christian part: 18

Job 29 is the 29th chapter of the Book of Job in the Hebrew Bible or the Old Testament of the Christian Bible. The book is anonymous; most scholars believe it was written around 6th century BCE. This chapter records the speech of Job, which belongs to the Dialogue section of the book, comprising Job 3:1–31:40.

== Text ==
The original text is written in Hebrew language. This chapter is divided into 25 verses.

=== Textual witnesses ===
Some early manuscripts containing the text of this chapter in Hebrew are of the Masoretic Text, which includes the Aleppo Codex (10th century), and Codex Leningradensis (1008).

There is also a translation into Koine Greek known as the Septuagint, made in the last few centuries BC; some extant ancient manuscripts of this version include Codex Vaticanus (B; $\mathfrak{G}$^{B}; 4th century), Codex Sinaiticus (S; BHK: $\mathfrak{G}$^{S}; 4th century), and Codex Alexandrinus (A; $\mathfrak{G}$^{A}; 5th century).

== Analysis ==
The structure of the book is as follows:

- The Prologue (chapters 1–2)
- The Dialogue (chapters 3–31)
- The Verdicts (32:1–42:6)
- The Epilogue (42:7–17)

Within the structure, chapter 29 is grouped into the Dialogue section with the following outline:

- Job's Self-Curse and Self-Lament (3:1–26)
- Round One (4:1–14:22)
- Round Two (15:1–21:34)
- Round Three (22:1–27:23)
- Interlude – A Poem on Wisdom (28:1–28)
- Job's Summing Up (29:1–31:40)
  - Job's Former Prosperity (29:1–25)
    - Job's Former Blessings (29:1–6)
    - Job's Former Honor (29:7–10)
    - Job's Former Role in Administering Justice (29:11–17)
    - Job's Expectation of Ongoing Peace (29:18–20)
    - Job's Prominence in the Community (29:21–25)
  - Job's Present Suffering (30:1–31)
    - How Job Would Have Viewed His Mockers (30:1–8)
    - The Attacks of His Enemies (30:9–15)
    - God Is Causing His Present Sufferings (30:16–19)
    - Accusing God (30:20–23)
    - Withdrawing into Despair (30:24–31)
  - Job's Final Defense (31:1–40)
    - His Rejection of Lust (31:1–4)
    - His Denial of Falsehood and Deceit (31:5–8)
    - His Avoidance of Adultery (31:9–12)
    - His Care for His Servants (31:13–15)
    - His Righteousness in Dealing with the Poor and Marginalized (31:16–23)
    - His Refusal to Worship Money or Other Gods (31:24–28)
    - Not Guilty of a Variety of Wrongs (31:29–34)
    - The Call for God to Answer (31:35–37)
    - His Right Treatment of the Land (31:38–40)

The Dialogue section is composed in the format of poetry with distinctive syntax and grammar. At the end of the Dialogue, Job sums up his speech in a comprehensive review (chapters 29–31), with Job 29 describes Job's former prosperity, Job 30 focuses on Job's current suffering and Job 31 outlines Job's final defense. The whole part is framed by Job's longing for a restored relationship with God (Job 29:2) and the legal challenge to God (Job 31:35–27). Chapter 29 begins with the description of Job's former experience of his relationship with God in his family and personal circumstances (verses 2–6), then his former honorable place in the community (verses 7–10) as he actively worked for justice (verses 11–17), followed by the section comprising verses 18–20 that shows Job's expectation of ongoing peace, then closed by a summary of Job's former prominence as a respected leader in the community.

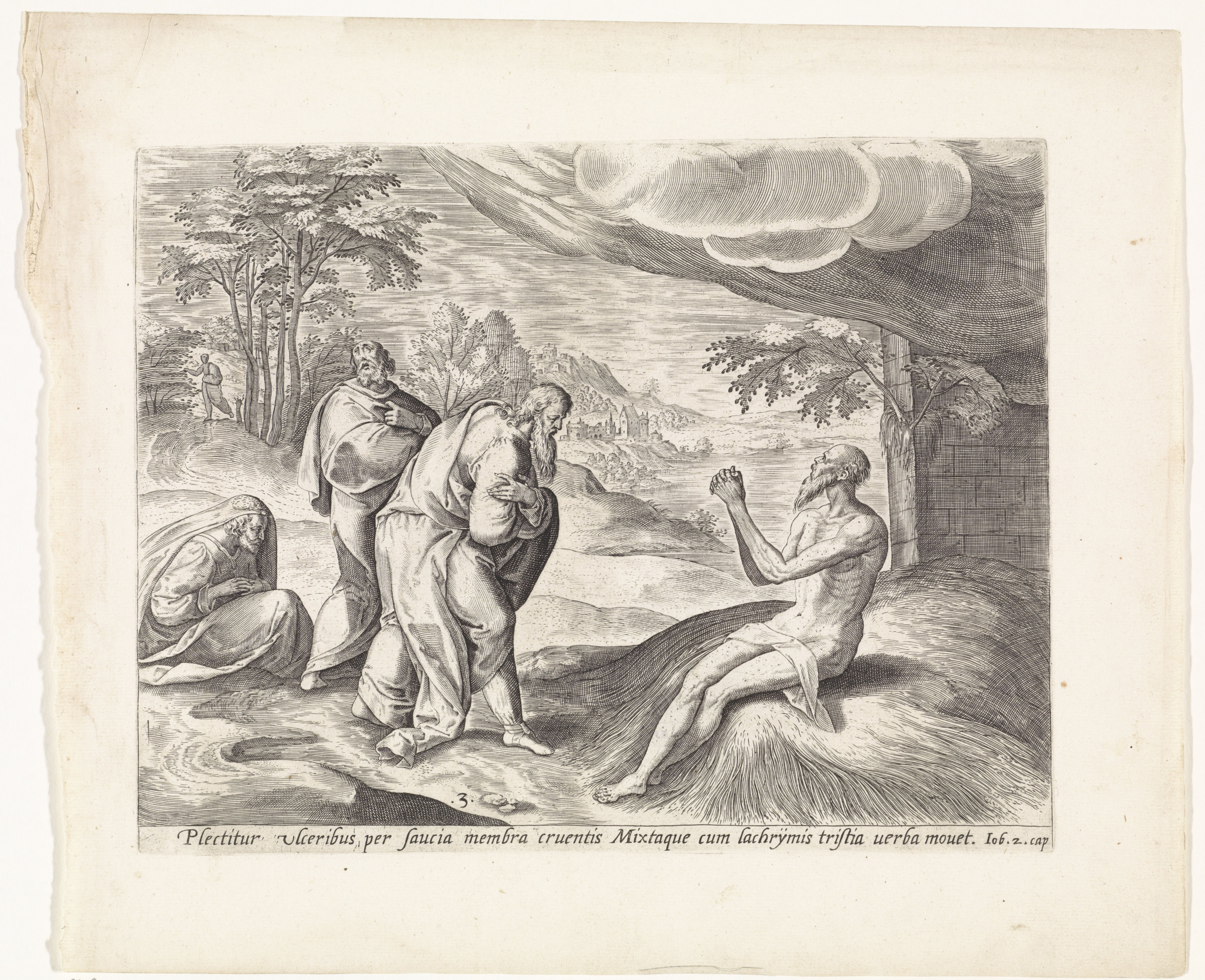
"Job on the dunghill visited by his friends (and wife)". From: Thesaurus sacrarum historiarum veteris testamenti, Gerard de Jode, Antwerpen (1579/1585).

== Job's former blessings, honor and public role (29:1–20) ==
The section starts with Job reminiscing "the day when God watched over me", which he puts before his own prosperity (verse 2), before his full family (verse 5) or abundant materials (verse 6), so it is Job's friendship with God that Job desperately misses. Before his suffering, Job assumed a respected public profile (verse 7) with people young and old acknowledging his wisdom (verse 8) that even "princes" and "nobles" stop speaking as soon as Job started to speak (verse 9–10). There is a list of Job's just actions in the community, especially towards the poor and marginalized (verses 12–16), depicting him as the wise ruler of Proverbs (Proverbs 28:4–6. 15–16; 31:4–5). Job describes his expectation in his former life of a peaceful and fulfilling situation (verses 18.–20).

=== Verse 6 ===
[Job said:] "when my steps were washed with butter,

and the rock poured out for me streams of oil!"

- "Butter" or "cream" (NKJV) or "curds" (cf. Job 21:17).
- "The rock poured out": referring to olive trees that thrive in rocky soil, and the oil presses that are cut into the rock. This is a picture of God's limitless blessing on Job (cf. YHWH's provision of Israel in Deuteronomy 32:13).

== Job's prominence in the community (29:21–25) ==
This section rounds up Job's summary of his former life, picking up some concepts in verses 7–10, mainly about his position in the community. Job's advice was very respected that it usually becomes the outcome of ending discussion, described as "final and life-giving". However, Job also involves in the lives of others, acting in genuine care for the people.

=== Verse 25 ===
[Job said:] "I chose their way and sat as chief,

and I lived like a king among his troops,
like one who comforts mourners.’"

Job's final recollection of his past is how he was deeply loved and well-respected just like a king, who comforts mourning people, a stark contrast to the treatment of his friends to him now when he was mourning.

== See also ==
- City gate
- Diadem
- Nobility
- Poverty
- Wisdom
- Related Bible parts: Job 1, Job 21, Job 42

== Sources ==
- Alter, Robert (2010). The Wisdom Books: Job, Proverbs, and Ecclesiastes: A Translation with Commentary. W.W. Norton & Co. ISBN 978-0393080735.
- Coogan, Michael David (2007). Coogan, Michael David; Brettler, Marc Zvi; Newsom, Carol Ann; Perkins, Pheme (eds.). The New Oxford Annotated Bible with the Apocryphal/Deuterocanonical Books: New Revised Standard Version, Issue 48 (Augmented 3rd ed.). Oxford University Press. ISBN 9780195288810.
- Crenshaw, James L. (2007). "17. Job". In Barton, John; Muddiman, John (eds.). The Oxford Bible Commentary (first (paperback) ed.). Oxford University Press. pp. 331–355. ISBN 978-0199277186.
- Estes, Daniel J. (2013). Walton, John H.; Strauss, Mark L. (eds.). Job. Teach the Text Commentary Series. United States: Baker Publishing Group. ISBN 9781441242778.
- Farmer, Kathleen A. (1998). "The Wisdom Books". In McKenzie, Steven L.; Graham, Matt Patrick (eds.). The Hebrew Bible Today: An Introduction to Critical Issues. Westminster John Knox Press. ISBN 978-0-66425652-4.
- Halley, Henry H. (1965). Halley's Bible Handbook: an abbreviated Bible commentary (24th (revised) ed.). Zondervan Publishing House. ISBN 0-310-25720-4.
- Kugler, Robert; Hartin, Patrick J. (2009). An Introduction to the Bible. Eerdmans. ISBN 978-0-8028-4636-5.
- Walton, John H. (2012). Job. United States: Zondervan. ISBN 9780310492009.
- Wilson, Lindsay (2015). Job. United States: Wm. B. Eerdmans Publishing Company. ISBN 9781467443289.
- Würthwein, Ernst (1995). The Text of the Old Testament. Translated by Rhodes, Erroll F. Grand Rapids, MI: Wm. B. Eerdmans. ISBN 0-8028-0788-7.
