= Job 27 =

27th chapter of the Book of Job

- ← chapter 26 chapter 28 →
- The whole Book of Job in the Leningrad Codex (1008 CE) from an old facsimile edition
- Book: Book of Job
- Hebrew Bible part: Ketuvim
- Order in the Hebrew part: 3
- Category: Sifrei Emet
- Christian Bible part: Old Testament
- Order in the Christian part: 18

Job 27 is the 27th chapter of the Book of Job in the Hebrew Bible or the Old Testament of the Christian Bible. The book is anonymous; most scholars believe it was written around the 6th century BCE. This chapter records the speech of Job, which belongs to the Dialogue section of the book, comprising Job 3:1–31:40.

== Text ==
The original text is written in the Hebrew language. This chapter is divided into 23 verses.

=== Textual witnesses ===
Some early manuscripts containing the text of this chapter in Hebrew are of the Masoretic Text, which includes the Aleppo Codex (10th century), and Codex Leningradensis (1008).

There is also a translation into Koine Greek known as the Septuagint, made in the last few centuries BCE; some extant ancient manuscripts of this version include Codex Vaticanus (B; $\mathfrak{G}$^{B}; 4th century), Codex Sinaiticus (S; BHK: $\mathfrak{G}$^{S}; 4th century), and Codex Alexandrinus (A; $\mathfrak{G}$^{A}; 5th century).

== Analysis ==
The structure of the book is as follows:

- The Prologue (chapters 1–2)
- The Dialogue (chapters 3–31)
- The Verdicts (32:1–42:6)
- The Epilogue (42:7–17)

Within the structure, chapter 27 is grouped into the Dialogue section with the following outline:

- Job's Self-Curse and Self-Lament (3:1–26)
- Round One (4:1–14:22)
- Round Two (15:1–21:34)
- Round Three (22:1–27:23)
  - Eliphaz (22:1–30)
  - Job (23:1–24:25)
  - Bildad (25:1–6)
  - Job (26:1–27:23)
    - A Strong Rebuke of the Friends (26:1–4)
    - Praise for God's Majestic Power (26:5–14)
    - Insisting on His Integrity (27:1–6)
    - Offering to Instruct the Wicked (27:7–12)
    - The Fate of the Wicked (27:13–23)
  - Interlude – A Poem on Wisdom (28:1–28)
- Job's Summing Up (29:1–31:40)

The Dialogue section is composed in the format of poetry with distinctive syntax and grammar. Comparing the three cycles of debate, the third (and final) round can be seen as 'incomplete', because there is no speech from Zophar and the speech by Bildad is very short (6 verses only), which may indicate as a symptom of disintegration of the friends' arguments. Job's final speech in the third cycle of debate mainly comprises chapters 26 to 27, but in the silence of his friends, Job continues his speech until chapter 31. Chapter 27 can be divided into three parts:

1. Job restates his insistence on his integrity (verses 1–6)
2. Job accuses his friends to be among the wicked by going against him (verses 7–12)
3. Job proceeds to state the future lot of the wicked (verses 13–23)

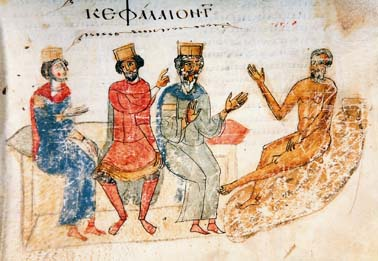
"Job and his three friends". From: Book of Job in Illuminated Manuscripts.List of Byzantine Manuscripts with Cyclic Illustration (AD 900). Monastery of St.John the Theologian, Patmos.

== Job again insists on his integrity (27:1–6) ==
After a possible brief pause (see verse 1), Job resumes his speech with a complaint that God's denial to provide him justice has greatly impacted Job emotionally, so God has made his life bitter (verse 2). Despite all this, as long as he lives, Job persists in his struggle and does not speak deceitfully (verses 3–4). Job uses the "oath formula" for the first time in verses 2–4 to declare his innocence (a longer legal form appears in chapter 31). Job claims a clear conscience with no reproach by his own "heart" ("the core of his being"), so he is still seeking God to vindicate his integrity and righteousness (verses 5–6).

=== Verse 1 ===
[Job said:] And Job again took up his discourse, and said:

- "Again took up": this unusual introductory statement suggests that Job has stopped speaking after chapter 26 to give Zophar a chance to speak, but when Zophar remains silent, Job continues with his speech.
- "Discourse": translated from the Hebrew word מָשָׁל, mashal, which characteristically means "proverb; by-word", normally referring to "a brief saying", but can be used for a "discourse".

== Job speaks on the fate of the wicked (27:7–23) ==
This section contains Job's point about the wicked, opened with a strong declaration for those against him (verse 7) and followed by a teaching about the fate of the wicked. Job asks a series of rhetorical questions about the relationship between the wicked and God (verses 8–10) to challenge his friends why they could not see the reality and they became so "vain" or "lightweight" (verse 12; cf. Ecclesiastes 1:2ff). In the subsequent speech, Job states his stand on the fate of the wicked, correcting the error in his friends' statements about the same issue that actually back themselves into the same group as the wicked. According to Job, the wicked will eventually be driven out by God, although for a while they seemingly prosper, and be swept away without pity (verses 20–23).

=== Verse 8 ===
[Job said:] "For what is the hope of the hypocrite,

Though he may gain much,
If God takes away his life?"

- "He may gain much": translated from the Hebrew word יִבְצָע, yivtsaʿ, which root verb (בָּצַע, batsa) means "to cut off, break off, gain by violence.” This word could be translated transitively or intransitively—the latter can be read as "when he is cut off", or because the next line speaks of prayer, it is suggested to be rendered as "when he prays" (reading יִפְגַּע [yifgaʿ] instead of יִבְצָע [yivtsaʿ]).
- "Takes away": translated from the Hebrew verb יֵשֶׁל, yeshel, which is found only here. It can be related to "spoils [or sheaves]", or שָׁאַל, shaʾal, "to ask", or נָשָׂא, nasaʾ, "to lift up" [that is, to pray]); and many others.

The verse has been linked to the words of Jesus "What shall it profit a man, if he gain the whole world, and lose his own soul? or what shall a man give in exchange for his soul?" (Mark 8:36, 37) and to a parable of Jesus "But God said to him, ‘Fool! This night your soul will be required of you; then whose will those things be which you have provided?’" (Luke 12:20).

== See also ==
- Death
- Evil
- Deception
- Hypocrisy
- Punishment
- Ruach HaKodesh (Holy Spirit in Judaism)
- Shaddai (Almighty)
- Spirit of God
- Related Bible parts: Ecclesiastes 1, Mark 8, Luke 12

== Sources ==
- Alter, Robert (2010). The Wisdom Books: Job, Proverbs, and Ecclesiastes: A Translation with Commentary. W.W. Norton & Co. ISBN 978-0393080735.
- Coogan, Michael David (2007). Coogan, Michael David; Brettler, Marc Zvi; Newsom, Carol Ann; Perkins, Pheme (eds.). The New Oxford Annotated Bible with the Apocryphal/Deuterocanonical Books: New Revised Standard Version, Issue 48 (Augmented 3rd ed.). Oxford University Press. ISBN 9780195288810.
- Crenshaw, James L. (2007). "17. Job". In Barton, John; Muddiman, John (eds.). The Oxford Bible Commentary (first (paperback) ed.). Oxford University Press. pp. 331–355. ISBN 978-0199277186.
- Estes, Daniel J. (2013). Walton, John H.; Strauss, Mark L. (eds.). Job. Teach the Text Commentary Series. United States: Baker Publishing Group. ISBN 9781441242778.
- Farmer, Kathleen A. (1998). "The Wisdom Books". In McKenzie, Steven L.; Graham, Matt Patrick (eds.). The Hebrew Bible Today: An Introduction to Critical Issues. Westminster John Knox Press. ISBN 978-0-66425652-4.
- Halley, Henry H. (1965). Halley's Bible Handbook: an abbreviated Bible commentary (24th (revised) ed.). Zondervan Publishing House. ISBN 0-310-25720-4.
- Kugler, Robert; Hartin, Patrick J. (2009). An Introduction to the Bible. Eerdmans. ISBN 978-0-8028-4636-5.
- Walton, John H. (2012). Job. United States: Zondervan. ISBN 9780310492009.
- Wilson, Lindsay (2015). Job. United States: Wm. B. Eerdmans Publishing Company. ISBN 9781467443289.
- Würthwein, Ernst (1995). The Text of the Old Testament. Translated by Rhodes, Erroll F. Grand Rapids, MI: Wm. B. Eerdmans. ISBN 0-8028-0788-7.
