= Job 30 =

30th chapter of the Book of Job

- ← chapter 29 chapter 31 →
- The whole Book of Job in the Leningrad Codex (1008 C.E.) from an old facsimile edition.
- Book: Book of Job
- Hebrew Bible part: Ketuvim
- Order in the Hebrew part: 3
- Category: Sifrei Emet
- Christian Bible part: Old Testament
- Order in the Christian part: 18

Job 30 is the 30th chapter of the Book of Job in the Hebrew Bible or the Old Testament of the Christian Bible. The book is anonymous; most scholars believe it was written around 6th century BCE. This chapter records the speech of Job, which belongs to the Dialogue section of the book, comprising Job 3:1–31:40.

== Text ==
The original text is written in Hebrew language. This chapter is divided into 31 verses.

=== Textual witnesses ===
Some early manuscripts containing the text of this chapter in Hebrew are of the Masoretic Text, which includes the Aleppo Codex (10th century), and Codex Leningradensis (1008).

There is also a translation into Koine Greek known as the Septuagint, made in the last few centuries BC; some extant ancient manuscripts of this version include Codex Vaticanus (B; $\mathfrak{G}$^{B}; 4th century), Codex Sinaiticus (S; BHK: $\mathfrak{G}$^{S}; 4th century), and Codex Alexandrinus (A; $\mathfrak{G}$^{A}; 5th century).

== Analysis ==
The structure of the book is as follows:

- The Prologue (chapters 1–2)
- The Dialogue (chapters 3–31)
- The Verdicts (32:1–42:6)
- The Epilogue (42:7–17)

Within the structure, chapter 30 is grouped into the Dialogue section with the following outline:

- Job's Self-Curse and Self-Lament (3:1–26)
- Round One (4:1–14:22)
- Round Two (15:1–21:34)
- Round Three (22:1–27:23)
- Interlude – A Poem on Wisdom (28:1–28)
- Job's Summing Up (29:1–31:40)
  - Job's Former Prosperity (29:1–25)
    - Job's Former Blessings (29:1–6)
    - Job's Former Honor (29:7–10)
    - Job's Former Role in Administering Justice (29:11–17)
    - Job's Expectation of Ongoing Peace (29:18–20)
    - Job's Prominence in the Community (29:21–25)
  - Job's Present Suffering (30:1–31)
    - How Job Would Have Viewed His Mockers (30:1–8)
    - The Attacks of His Enemies (30:9–15)
    - God Is Causing His Present Sufferings (30:16–19)
    - Accusing God (30:20–23)
    - Withdrawing into Despair (30:24–31)
  - Job's Final Defense (31:1–40)
    - His Rejection of Lust (31:1–4)
    - His Denial of Falsehood and Deceit (31:5–8)
    - His Avoidance of Adultery (31:9–12)
    - His Care for His Servants (31:13–15)
    - His Righteousness in Dealing with the Poor and Marginalized (31:16–23)
    - His Refusal to Worship Money or Other Gods (31:24–28)
    - Not Guilty of a Variety of Wrongs (31:29–34)
    - The Call for God to Answer (31:35–37)
    - His Right Treatment of the Land (31:38–40)

The Dialogue section is composed in the format of poetry with distinctive syntax and grammar. At the end of the Dialogue, Job sums up his speech in a comprehensive review (chapters 29–31), with Job 29 describes Job's former prosperity, Job 30 focuses on Job's current suffering and Job 31 outlines Job's final defense. The whole part is framed by Job's longing for a restored relationship with God (Job 29:2) and the legal challenge to God (Job 31:35–27). Chapter 30 describes Job's suffering after his world was turned upside down (in stark contrast with chapter 29), from enjoying "the respect of the most respectable" (Job 29:21–25) to undergo "the contempt of the most contemptible" (Job 30:1, 9–12). Job complains to God directly about his condition as he believes God determines all aspects of his life (verses 16–23), before withdrawing in despair that no one, not even God, has shown him mercy or care (verses 24–31).

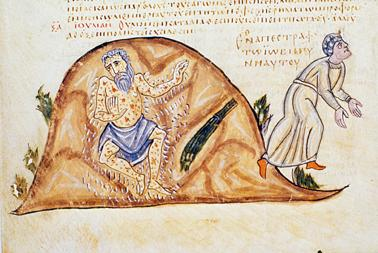
"Job". From: Book of Job in Illuminated Byzantine Manuscripts with Cyclic Illustration. Rome:Biblioteca Apostolica Vaticana (AD 900).

== Job speaks of the attack of mockers (30:1–15) ==
The first part of the section describes Job's mockers from Job's point-of-view (verses 2–8. With the recurrence of "and now" (verse 9; cf. "but now" in verse 1), Job returns to the complaint about the treatment of him by his "enemies", who include the outcasts of the community. The attacks are depicted as overwhelming in its severity and persistence.

=== Verse 1 ===
[Job said:] "But now those who are younger than I mock me,

whose fathers I disdained to put with the dogs of my flock."

- "But now": gives a contrast between Job's past and present reality.
- "Younger": literally in Hebrew: "of fewer days"

The last statement means that Job did not think highly enough of their father to put them with the dogs.

== Job shows despair of God's treatment to him (30:16–31) ==
In this section Job reiterates his conviction that God is in total control of his life, so he complains that he was not given mercy by God. Job hopes for restoration ("good") but only faces disaster ("evil"), so he can only see bleak pictures of his future life.

=== Verse 31 ===
[Job said:] "My harp is turned to mourning,

and my flute to the voice of those who weep."

The mention of the musical instruments may parallel with the naming of jackals and owls in verse 29 which are known for emitting screeching sounds (cf. Micah 1:8), instead of life-enhancing tones like lyre (harp) and pipes (flute).

== See also ==
- Mourning
- Poverty
- Self-pity
- Related Bible parts: Job 1, Job 2, Job 31

== Sources ==
- Alter, Robert (2010). The Wisdom Books: Job, Proverbs, and Ecclesiastes: A Translation with Commentary. W.W. Norton & Co. ISBN 978-0393080735.
- Coogan, Michael David (2007). Coogan, Michael David; Brettler, Marc Zvi; Newsom, Carol Ann; Perkins, Pheme (eds.). The New Oxford Annotated Bible with the Apocryphal/Deuterocanonical Books: New Revised Standard Version, Issue 48 (Augmented 3rd ed.). Oxford University Press. ISBN 9780195288810.
- Crenshaw, James L. (2007). "17. Job". In Barton, John; Muddiman, John (eds.). The Oxford Bible Commentary (first (paperback) ed.). Oxford University Press. pp. 331–355. ISBN 978-0199277186.
- Estes, Daniel J. (2013). Walton, John H.; Strauss, Mark L. (eds.). Job. Teach the Text Commentary Series. United States: Baker Publishing Group. ISBN 9781441242778.
- Farmer, Kathleen A. (1998). "The Wisdom Books". In McKenzie, Steven L.; Graham, Matt Patrick (eds.). The Hebrew Bible Today: An Introduction to Critical Issues. Westminster John Knox Press. ISBN 978-0-66425652-4.
- Halley, Henry H. (1965). Halley's Bible Handbook: an abbreviated Bible commentary (24th (revised) ed.). Zondervan Publishing House. ISBN 0-310-25720-4.
- Kugler, Robert; Hartin, Patrick J. (2009). An Introduction to the Bible. Eerdmans. ISBN 978-0-8028-4636-5.
- Walton, John H. (2012). Job. United States: Zondervan. ISBN 9780310492009.
- Wilson, Lindsay (2015). Job. United States: Wm. B. Eerdmans Publishing Company. ISBN 9781467443289.
- Würthwein, Ernst (1995). The Text of the Old Testament. Translated by Rhodes, Erroll F. Grand Rapids, MI: Wm. B. Eerdmans. ISBN 0-8028-0788-7.
