= Penny Sartori =

British near-death experience researcher

- Occupation: Medical researcher
- Known for: Research near-death experiences

Penny Sartori is a British medical researcher in the field of near-death studies.

== Biography ==
Sartori worked as an intensive care nurse for seventeen years, during which time she cared for many patients who were close to death. As a result of these experiences, she began researching near-death experiences, culminating in the publication of her monograph The Near-Death Experiences of Hospitalized Intensive Care Patients: A Five Year Clinical Study, which was published by the Edwin Mellen Press in 2008. Her work also gained her a PhD in 2005. She now works as a lecturer and consultant.

NDEs experiencies researched by Sartori involved both religious and non-believers.

Sartori's book, The Wisdom Of Near-Death Experiences, explores the veracity of Near-Death Experiences in more depth.
