= Eretz =

Eretz (Hebrew: ארץ) is Hebrew for "land", "country" (with the definite article, HaAretz (Hebrew: הארץ, "the land")

In particular, it may refer to:

- HaAretz HaMuvtahat, the "Promised Land"
- Eretz Israel, the Land of Israel
- Haaretz, originally Hadashot Ha'Aretz "News of the Land", Israeli newspaper

== See also ==
- Am ha'aretz, "people of the land", i.e. "natives" or "pagans"
