= Job 28 =

28th chapter of the Book of Job in the Hebrew Bible

- ← chapter 27 chapter 29 →
- The whole Book of Job in the Leningrad Codex (1008 C.E.) from an old facsimile edition.
- Book: Book of Job
- Hebrew Bible part: Ketuvim
- Order in the Hebrew part: 3
- Category: Sifrei Emet
- Christian Bible part: Old Testament
- Order in the Christian part: 18

Job 28 is the 28th chapter of the Book of Job in the Hebrew Bible or the Old Testament of the Christian Bible. The book is anonymous; most scholars believe it was written around the 6th century BCE. This chapter records the speech of Job, which belongs to the Dialogue section of the book, comprising Job 3:1–31:40.

== Text ==
The original text is written in the Hebrew language. This chapter is divided into 28 verses.

=== Textual witnesses ===
Some early manuscripts containing the text of this chapter in Hebrew are of the Masoretic Text, which includes the Aleppo Codex (10th century), and Codex Leningradensis (1008).

There is also a translation into Koine Greek known as the Septuagint, made in the last few centuries BC; some extant ancient manuscripts of this version include Codex Vaticanus (B; $\mathfrak{G}$^{B}; 4th century), Codex Sinaiticus (S; BHK: $\mathfrak{G}$^{S}; 4th century), and Codex Alexandrinus (A; $\mathfrak{G}$^{A}; 5th century).

== Analysis ==
The structure of the book is as follows:

- The Prologue (chapters 1–2)
- The Dialogue (chapters 3–31)
- The Verdicts (32:1–42:6)
- The Epilogue (42:7–17)

Within the structure, chapter 28 is grouped into the Dialogue section with the following outline:

- Job's Self-Curse and Self-Lament (3:1–26)
- Round One (4:1–14:22)
- Round Two (15:1–21:34)
- Round Three (22:1–27:23)
  - Eliphaz (22:1–30)
  - Job (23:1–24:25)
  - Bildad (25:1–6)
  - Job (26:1–27:23)
  - Interlude – A Poem on Wisdom (28:1–28)
    - The Achievements of Humanity (28:1–12)
    - Humans Cannot Buy Wisdom and Do Not Value It (28:13–20)
    - God Knows the Way to Wisdom (28:21–27)
    - The Fear of God and Wisdom (28:28)
- Job's Summing Up (29:1–31:40)

The Dialogue section is composed in the format of poetry with distinctive syntax and grammar. Comparing the three cycles of debate, the third (and final) round can be seen as 'incomplete', because there is no speech from Zophar and the speech by Bildad is very short (6 verses only), which may indicate as a symptom of disintegration of the friends' arguments. Job's final speech in the third cycle of debate mainly comprises chapters 26 to 27, but in the silence of his friends, Job continues his speech until chapter 31. Chapter 28 can be divided into three parts, separated by two refrains (verses 12, 20), and concluded by the final statement of "fear of the Lord" (verse 28):

1. human searching cannot find wisdom (28:1-12)
2. human wealth cannot purchase wisdom (28:13-20)
3. God alone understands the way to wisdom (28:21-28).

The refrains ask the question, "Where shall wisdom be found?" and the closing statement apparently gives the answer, "the fear of the Lord, that is wisdom."

The tone of Job 28 is calm, quite different from the 'turgid emotions of Job's speeches' both in the preceding (27) and in succeeding chapters (29–31), with a distinctive content as well. This leads to the debate whether Job is really the speaker of the whole chapter. This chapter may well be an interlude spoken by the narrator (or 'authorial comment') serving as a transition from the three rounds of dialogue (Job 3–27) to the three extended monologues by Job (Job 29–31), Elihu (Job 32–37), and God (Job 38–41).

Several factors have been listed to doubt that Job is not the speaker:

1. The following chapter starts with "Job again took up his discourse" (29:1), as also similarly stated in 26:1, 27:1, but not in 28:1.
2. The drastic change in literary genre and the irenic poetic tone of the chapter signal the unlikeliness to be a part of the debate, but more as an appropriate reflection by the author or editor at the time when the dialogue has broken down.

Although Zophar cover similar themes in Job 11:7–12 only few scholars regard this chapter as Zophar's 'missing third speech' due to, among others, the absence of accusation. Some scholars suggest that it was spoken by Elihu, or that it belongs after Job 42:6, whereas others propose to remove it as inauthentic.

The location of Job 28 within the structure of the whole book suggests that it is not an anticipation of the conclusion and theme of the book, so it cannot be "the high point of the book", because it still does not provide the answer for Job. This chapter serves the important literary function of preparing for what is to follow, that is, the possible conclusion of verse 28 is reframed by chapters 29–31, in which Job insists that the issues are not resolved, and finally leads to God's verdict.

== The achievements of humanity (28:1–12) ==
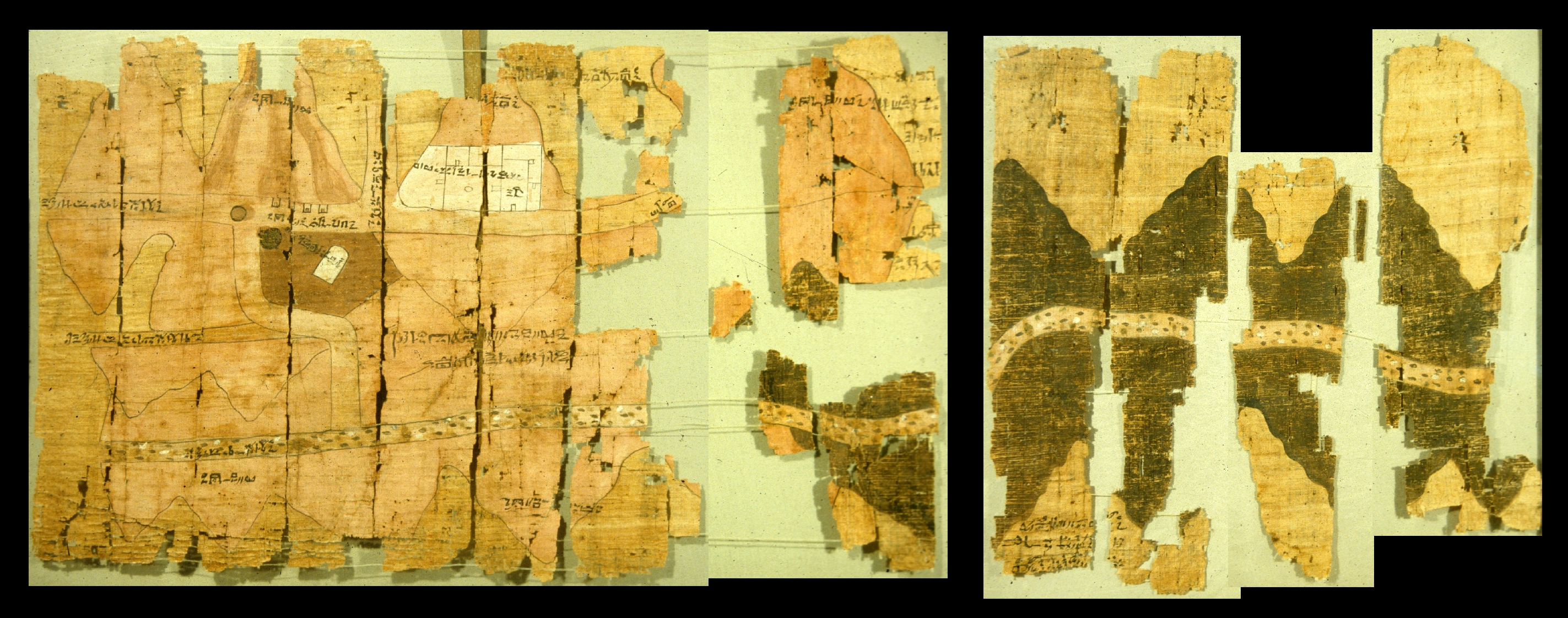
An ancient Egyptian mining map (left half) for Ramesses IV's quarrying expedition, 12th century BC (New Kingdom), in fragments of Turin papyrus.

Job 28:1-11 presents a vivid description of the ancient technology that was used in mining precious metals and gemstones. There was no mining activity in Israel (cf. 1 Samuel 13:19-22), because its natural resources were limited, unlike in Egypt where extensive mining activity began around 2000 BC, or other parts in the ancient Mesopotamia. Mining requires delving deep in the dark places to produce stunning products (sapphire/lapis lazuli, gold) from rocks or dusts; a principle that can be applied to the search of wisdom, "brings hidden things to light" (verse 11).

=== Verse 4 ===
[Job said:] He breaks open a shaft away from the inhabitants;

in places forgotten by feet
they hang far away from men; and they totter."

- "Inhabitants": translated from the Hebrew word גָּר, gar, meaning "abide; live (place)". The Greek Septuagint translate the same Hebrew word as "limestone".
- "Forgotten by feet": to mean that these mines are so deep below that the people walking above on the ground don't notice the miners underneath.
- "Totter": or "swing to and fro" (NKJV; ESV), describing the risky mining procedures which often involve precariously dangling suspended from a rope would be a necessary part of the job of going up and down the shafts to reach the treasures.

== Elusive Wisdom (28:13–20) ==
The second stanza describes the limited ability of humans to master wisdom, as they cannot comprehend the value of 'wisdom and understanding' (verse 13), nor can they offer anything to gain them (verses 15–19). Human mining skills cannot be used to find these 'twin jewels of "wisdom and understanding"'. Thus, the whole stanza asserts that wisdom is neither fully attainable nor properly valued.

=== Verse 16 ===
[Job said:] "It cannot be valued in the gold of Ophir,

in precious onyx or sapphire."

- "Gold": mentioned here to indicate that no amount of human wealth can buy wisdom (cf/ Proverbs 8:10–11).

== Source of wisdom (28:20–28) ==
The key assertion of the last stanza is that wisdom is generally concealed from living creatures (verse 21), its location is unknown even when searched as far as the very edges of reality (verse 22). Only God knows the location and nature of wisdom, while also makes it known to others (verse 27). The conclusion is that "wisdom and understanding" can only be acquired by fearing God and turning away from evil.

=== Verse 28 ===
[Job said:] "And he said to man,
‘Behold, the fear of the Lord, that is wisdom,

and to turn away from evil is understanding.’"

- "Fear of the Lord": translated from the Hebrew phrase יראת אדני, yir-’aṯ ’ă-ḏō-nāy, which occurs only here in the Hebrew Bible (Old Testament), but it is equivalent to the wisdom phrase yir-’aṯ YHWH, which is "fear of YHWH/the LORD" (cf. Proverbs 1:7; 9:10; Psalm 111:10).

== See also ==
- Ethiopia
- Gold
- Onyx
- Ophir
- Sapphire
- Silver
- Topaz
- Wisdom
- Related Bible parts: Psalm 111, Proverbs 1, Proverbs 9, Job 42

== Sources ==
- Alter, Robert (2010). The Wisdom Books: Job, Proverbs, and Ecclesiastes: A Translation with Commentary. W.W. Norton & Co. ISBN 978-0393080735.
- Coogan, Michael David (2007). Coogan, Michael David; Brettler, Marc Zvi; Newsom, Carol Ann; Perkins, Pheme (eds.). The New Oxford Annotated Bible with the Apocryphal/Deuterocanonical Books: New Revised Standard Version, Issue 48 (Augmented 3rd ed.). Oxford University Press. ISBN 9780195288810.
- Crenshaw, James L. (2007). "17. Job". In Barton, John; Muddiman, John (eds.). The Oxford Bible Commentary (first (paperback) ed.). Oxford University Press. pp. 331–355. ISBN 978-0199277186.
- Estes, Daniel J. (2013). Walton, John H.; Strauss, Mark L. (eds.). Job. Teach the Text Commentary Series. United States: Baker Publishing Group. ISBN 9781441242778.
- Farmer, Kathleen A. (1998). "The Wisdom Books". In McKenzie, Steven L.; Graham, Matt Patrick (eds.). The Hebrew Bible Today: An Introduction to Critical Issues. Westminster John Knox Press. ISBN 978-0-66425652-4.
- Halley, Henry H. (1965). Halley's Bible Handbook: an abbreviated Bible commentary (24th (revised) ed.). Zondervan Publishing House. ISBN 0-310-25720-4.
- Kugler, Robert; Hartin, Patrick J. (2009). An Introduction to the Bible. Eerdmans. ISBN 978-0-8028-4636-5.
- Walton, John H. (2012). Job. United States: Zondervan. ISBN 9780310492009.
- Wilson, Lindsay (2015). Job. United States: Wm. B. Eerdmans Publishing Company. ISBN 9781467443289.
- Würthwein, Ernst (1995). The Text of the Old Testament. Translated by Rhodes, Erroll F. Grand Rapids, MI: Wm. B. Eerdmans. ISBN 0-8028-0788-7.
