= Walter van Laack =

Walter van Laack (born 1957 in Cologne) is a German specialist in orthopedics, Special Orthopaedic Surgery and Sports Medicine. He lay at the University of Cologne from his state examination and attained a doctorate 1982 at the RWTH Aachen University. Van Laack practiced in an orthopedic group practice in Herzogenrath and teaches at the Fachhochschule Aachen the subjects medical, orthopedic and border areas of medicine. 2014 he was appointed professor here. He is also managing director and co-owner of his own book publishing company.

Van Laack is concerned in particular with the issue of near-death experiences. For this purpose he has already published numerous books, appeared in TV shows and writes columns, among others in the Huffington Post.

In 2010, van Laack received the Burkhard Heim Award of the umbrella organization Spiritual healing (DGH).

Walter van Laack lives in Aachen and is married and father of two sons.

== Books authored ==
- A Better History of Our World (volume 1): ISBN 3-8311-1490-0
- Der Schlüssel zur Ewigkeit: ISBN 3-89811-819-3
- Eine bessere Geschichte unserer Welt: Der Tod (volume 3): ISBN 3-8311-3581-9
- Key to Eternity: ISBN 3-8311-0344-5
- Mit Logik die Welt begreifen: ISBN 3-9366-2404-6
- Unser Schlüssel zur Ewigkeit: ISBN 3-9366-2416-X
- Wer stirbt, ist nicht tot!: ISBN 3-9366-2412-7

== Cinematic documentation (selection) ==
- ZDF Mittagsmagazin: NDEs are not brain products, interview with Walter van Laack
- Video: Mirror TV: Is there life after death? View into the Hereafter see posts by Walter van Laack
- Interview with Walter van Laack
- Phoenix: Near-Death Experiences - Is there life after death ?, Interview with Walter van Laack
