= Islamic view of death =

Religious belief

Death in Islam is the termination of worldly life and the beginning of afterlife. Death is seen as the separation of the soul from the human body, and its transfer from this world to the afterlife.

Islamic tradition discusses what happens before, during, and after death, although what exactly happens is not clear and different schools of thought draw different conclusions. However, a continuity between all these ideas derived from the basic sources from the Qur'an and Hadith. One canonical idea is, that an angel of death (Arabic: Malak al-Maut) appears to the dying to take out their souls. The sinners' souls are extracted in the most painful way while the righteous are treated easily.

Another common belief adds that, after the burial, two angels – Munkar and Nakir – come to question the dead in order to test their faith. The righteous believers answer correctly and live in peace and comfort while the sinners and disbelievers fail and punishments ensue. The time period or stage between death and the end of the world is called the life of Barzakh. Suicide, euthanasia, and unjust murder as means of death are all prohibited in Islam, and are considered major sins.

Believing in an afterlife is one of the six articles of faith in Islam. The deceased are held to be in an intermediary state, until the Day of Resurrection.

== Significance ==
Death is seen not as the termination of life, rather the continuation of life in another form. In Islamic belief, God has made this worldly life as a test and a preparation ground for the afterlife; and with death, this worldly life comes to an end. Thus, every person has only one chance to prepare themselves for the life to come where God will resurrect and judge every individual and will entitle them to rewards or punishment, based on their good or bad deeds. Death is also seen as the gateway to the beginning of the afterlife. In Islamic belief, death is predetermined by God, and the exact time of a person's death is known only to God. Death is accepted as wholly natural, and merely marks a transition between the material realm and the unseen world.

Muslims expect that their last word in this world would be their profession of faith (which reads "I testify that there is no god but Allah, and Muhammad is the messenger of Allah"). This is considered an act which will allow one to enter Jannah (Heaven).

Mu`adh bin Jabal (May Allah be pleased with him) reported: The Messenger of Allah (ﷺ) said, "He whose last words are: `La ilaha illallah' (There is no true god except Allah) will enter Jannah.

— Riyad as-Salihin,917

This is why those near a dying person encourage them to pronounce these words; sometimes, it is whispered into the ear of the dying.

Common belief holds that true believers and the righteous welcome death when it arrives. Many modern writers especially assure that death is merely a transitional stage and do not adhere to the traditional depiction of death as painful or fearsome.

== Period between death and Resurrection ==
Islam holds different positions regarding the abode after the deceased. The Quran itself refers to both rūḥ (later used to designate a human's immortal self) and nafs (meaning "self", used to refer to both a person's soul and the souls of humanity collectively). However, Muslims, those influenced by Neo-Platonism, Muʿtazila, classical Islamic theology, Shi'a and Sufis, regarded rūḥ as a matter unrelated to a human's immortal spirit. Therefore, they distinguish between nafs and rūḥ, the latter surviving death. Some scholars, like Muhammad ibn Zakariya al-Razi, have even argued that the spirit undergoes changes affected by its previous life, and might turn into a demon (Div) after death if the person died in the state of a major sin.

There are different concepts on what happens during the period between death and resurrection. Some hold that the soul is insensate until resurrection. Others believe that the soul undergoes punishment or pleasure depending on their final destination. A third concept depicts the souls as inhabiting paradise and hell in barzakh.

Among Turkish Muslims it is believed that the soul of the dead may roam around the corpse for a few days after death.

According to a hadith from Sahih Muslim, Muhammad said: "When the rūḥ (soul) is taken out, the eyesight follows it."

== Interaction between the dead and the living ==
The Quran itself gives only brief references about the period between death and the resurrection. However, it mentions that certain individuals, such as martyrs, are alive and not dead (2:154), and also indicate, that some are already in hell (71:25). The term Barzakh indicates that the deceased and the living are entirely separated and can not interact with each other. Otherwise the Barzakh refers to the whole period between the Day of Resurrection and death and is used synonymously for "grave". Others regard Barzakh as a world dividing and simultaneously connecting the realm of the dead and the living. Therefore, some Muslim traditions argue about possibilities to contact the dead by sleeping on graveyards. Visiting graves of holy persons or prophets is also a common practise among Muslims, known as Ziyarat.

Muslim authors, like Ghazali, Ibn Qayyim and Suyuti wrote in greater detail about the life of ghosts. Ibn Qayyim and Suyuti assert that when a soul desires to turn back to earth long enough, it is gradually released from restrictions of Barzakh and is able to move freely. Each spirit experiences afterlife in accordance with their deeds and conditions in the earthly life. Evil souls will find the afterlife as painful and punishing, imprisoned until God allows them to interact with others. Good souls are not restricted. They are free to come visit other souls and even come down to lower regions. The higher planes are considered to be broader than the lower ones, the lowest being the most narrow. The spiritual space is not thought as spatial, but reflects the capacity of the spirit. The more pure the spirit gets, the more it is able to interact with other souls and thus reaches a broader degree of freedom.

== Meeting angels and devils ==
After the burial each person is interrogated by two angels, called Munkar and Nakir, appointed by God to question the dead in order to test their faith. The righteous believers answer correctly and live in peace and comfort while the sinners and disbelievers fail and punishments ensue.

According to The Precious Pearl, the veil (Barzakh) separating the living and the realm of symbols (Malakut) is lifted at the latest after the biological death, but also moments before for a spiritual person, when the dying person is able to see the angels and devils. Before the souls leaves the body completely, devils (shayāṭīn) sent by Iblis (Satan) persuade the deceased to abandon Islam and become an unbeliever, for example by disguising as a beloved one from heaven and telling them that Islam is not the true religion. At last, the devils are driven away by Jibrail (Gabriel) and the angels of mercy.

The fate of the dying after leaving the body depends on whether they are believers or unbelievers. Depending on the state of the soul, the deceased will undergo different journeys. When a righteous believer dies, bright-faced angels from heaven descends with divine perfume and shroud. Then the angels of death comes, and tells the soul to come out to the pleasure and mercy of God. The soul is then extracted as easily as water comes out from the pitcher. The soul is then wrapped in the perfumed shroud and is taken up to the seventh heaven where God declares: "write down his name in illiyin and take him back to earth. I created him from earth, and I will raise him second time from this very earth." The soul is then pushed back into the body and is interrogated by two angels called Munkar and Nakir. If he succeeds in answering the questions, and is blessed with heavenly rewards. The sinners or disbelievers meet the Angels of hell (Zabaniyya) to take position in front of him. Thereupon they tell the soul to come out to the wrath of God. Being terrified, the soul desperately tries to hide itself in the body. Thereupon, the angels of death start beating the soul and extracts it from the body in a most painful way. The painful process of taking out a sinner's soul has been compared with "the dragging of an iron skewer through moist wool, tearing the veins and sinews." The soul of the sinner is then wrapped in a dirty cloth which emits a bad odor. Carrying the soul, the angels head towards the heaven. On the way, other angels inquire about this wicked soul. They are told that this is the soul of that and that sinner person. The angels then arrive at the upper heaven, but its doors are not opened for the evil soul. Consequently, the soul is then thrown into hell or underworld, where it is punished until the Day of Judgment.

The souls of the sinners and disbelievers are kept and punished in a place called sijjin which is said to be located at the lowest level of the earth (traditionally hell, before the Day of Resurrection or underworld). The books containing the full records of their deeds are also kept here. On the other hand, the souls of the righteous believers are kept in a place called illiyin (heaven, the highest place). Their books of deeds are also kept here. According to some account, illiyin is located in the highest heaven.

Barzakh also holds some resemblance to the Christian idea of Limbo, that contains the souls, which go neither to heaven or to hell and remain in the grave. It is said that the martyrs – persons who die on the way of God – always skip Barzakh and the trial of the angels of death and go to paradise directly.

== In the Quran ==
The Quran discusses the issue of death in several places, wherein it emphasises that death is inevitable, and that no matter how much people try to escape death, it will reach everyone (Quran 50:19). For those who deny resurrection and afterlife, and thus challenge God, the Quran challenges them by asking why these people then do not put back the soul which has reached the throat (of the dying person) and is about to escape the body (56:83–84). It also says that when death approaches the sinners and disbelievers, and they sense the upcoming chastisement, they pray to God to go back to life to do some good deeds; but this will never be granted (23:99–100). Probably the most-frequently quoted verse of the Quran about death is: "Every soul shall taste death, and only on the Day of Judgment will you be paid your full recompense." At another place, the Quran urges mankind: "And die not except in a state of Islam" (3:102) because "Truly, the religion in the sight of Allah is Islam" (3:19). Other verses related with this issue are: "He (Allah) who created death and life, so that He may test you as to which of you is better in deeds. And He is the All-Mighty, the Most-Forgiving" (67:2); "Certainly, they see it (resurrection) as distant, but We see it as near" (70:6–7).

Life and death are far more than biological shifts; they are reflections of a soul’s relationship with its Creator. Drawing from the insights of the magnum opus Quranic exegesis, Tafsir Naeemi (Vol. 7, p. 379), we find that the terminology used in the Quran and Hadith meticulously distinguishes between the departure of a believer and that of a non-believer.

For the person of faith, death is a transition characterized by honor, love, and witnessing. The first term is wafat (The Honorable Retrieval), derived from the root wafa, meaning to fulfill or receive in full; it implies that when a believer’s trial concludes, the angels receive the soul with care, returning a precious trust to its Owner. The second is wisal (The Meeting), signifying the meeting of the lover with the Beloved, where the veil of separation is removed. The third is shahadat (The Ultimate Witness), the highest station of death, where one bears witness to the truth of the Faith with their life, attaining an eternal reality that transcends physical death.

Conversely, for those who lived in rebellion against the Truth, the terminology reflects a terrifying reckoning. The first term is tadmir (Annihilation), meaning to "root out" or obliterate. As stated in the Quran (17:16): “And when We intend to destroy a township, We command those of its people who lead a life of luxury, but they transgress therein; so the word is justified against it, and We destroy it with total destruction” (15:17:16). The second is halakat (Ruin), denoting the state of one who has bartered their eternal potential for fleeting worldly pleasures. The third is Akhdh (The Seizure), describing a sudden, inescapable Divine grip that overtakes a person in their state of heedlessness, leaving no room for repentance.

The Quranic lens also evaluates the quality of life through two distinct states that relate to spiritual alignment rather than material wealth. The life of a believer is described as hayat tayyibah (The Pure Life), a state of contentment and spiritual clarity. In contrast, the life of one who turns away from Divine remembrance is termed ma’ishat dhanka (The Constricted Life). As mentioned in the Quran (20:124): “And whoever turns away from My remembrance - indeed, he will have a depressed [narrow/constricted] life, and We will gather him on the Day of Resurrection blind” (16:20:124). "Dhank" refers to a narrowness so severe it causes spiritual suffocation; despite any physical luxury, the soul remains in a state of constant anxiety and existential claustrophobia. These terms emphasize that our choices define our reality, where life is the cultivation and death is the final harvest.

== Suicide ==
Islam, as with other Abrahamic religions, views suicide as one of the greatest sins and utterly detrimental to one's spiritual journey. The Islamic view is that life and death are given by Allah. The absolute prohibition is stated in the Quran, Surah 4:29 which states: "do not kill yourselves. Surely, Allah is Most Merciful to you." Life is sacred, and a gift from Allah; and it is only Allah, and not the human beings, who has the right to take it back. This willful taking of one's own life is considered a major sin in Islam. Committing suicide to save oneself from suffering is discouraged. Islam teaches that in the face of hardship, one should not directly pray for death. Instead, one should say: "Oh Allah! Let me live as long as life is good for me, and let me die if death is good for me." Euthanasia is considered one form of suicide and has the same ruling as that of suicide. Unjust killing of any human being is one of the most heinous and the cardinal sins in Islam.

== Cremation ==
Cremation is forbidden in Islam. The Quran prohibits the burning or the mutilation of dead bodies, whereas Surah 5:32 affirms: "if anyone saves a life, it would be as if he saves the life of all humanity".

In the same way, the artificial nutrition and hydration, as well as the organ transplant are controversial matters of interpretation because Islam has no ordained clergy and an unequivocal set of doctrinal living authorities.

== Akhirah ==
Ākhirah (Arabic: الآخرة) is an Islamic term referring to the hereafter. It is repeatedly referenced in chapters of the Quran concerning the Last Judgment, an important part of Islamic eschatology. Traditionally, it is considered to be one of the six main beliefs of Muslims. According to the Islamic beliefs, God will play the role of the judge, weighing the deeds of each individual. He will decide whether that person's ʾākhirah (afterlife) lies in Jahannam (Hell) or Jannah (Heaven) on the basis of the weight of either good or bad deeds in comparison with one another.

== See also ==
- Islamic eschatology
- Islamic funeral
- Jewish views on suicide
- Punishment of the Grave
- Religious views on suicide
