= Punishment of the Grave =

Islamic–Jewish religious concept

Punishment of the Grave (Arabic: عذاب القبر, romanized: ʿadhāb al-qabr, also translated Torment of the Grave) is a Judeo-Islamic concept about the time between death and resurrection on the Day of Judgement. According to some hadiths, the souls of the unrighteous are punished by two angels in the grave, while the righteous find the grave "peaceful and blessed".

The punishment of the grave is not explicitly mentioned in the Quran, although it is mentioned in the hadiths such as those compiled by Ibn Hanbal and appears as early as the 9th century, still present among the majority of Sunnis and Shias.

A similar concept can be found in the Jewish narrative in which the wicked are punished by angels of destruction in an intermediary state between the resurrection of the dead and the individual death.

== Religions ==
=== Islam ===
The Quran itself gives very brief references about the period between death and the resurrection. It makes no mention of any kind of reward or punishment being given to the deceased/dead in the grave. However it mentions that certain individuals such as martyrs are alive and not dead in 2:154 and also indicates, that some are already in hell in 71:25. The term Barzakh indicates that the deceased and the living are entirely separated and can not interact with each other. Otherwise Barzakh refers to the whole period between the Day of Resurrection and death and is used synonymously for "grave". Others regard barzakh as a world dividing and simultaneously connecting the realm of the dead and the living. Therefore, some Muslim traditions argue about possibilities to contact the dead by sleeping on graveyards. Despite the non-existent or at max, the brief mentionings in the Quran, Islamic tradition discusses elaborately, almost in graphic detail, as to what exactly happens before, during and after death, based on certain hadithic narrations.

After burial, each person is interrogated in the grave by two angels, called Munkar and Nakir, appointed by God to question the dead in order to test their faith. The righteous believers answer correctly and live in peace and comfort, while the sinners and disbelievers fail and punishments ensue. In the life of Barzakh, the souls of the sinners and disbelievers are kept and punished in a place called Sijjin which is said to be located at the lowest level of the earth (traditionally hell, before the Day of resurrection or underworld). The books containing the full records of their deeds are also kept here. On the other hand, the souls of the righteous believers are kept in a place called Illiyin. Their books of deeds are also kept here. According to some accounts, Illiyin is located in the heaven. There is belief that the fire which represents the own bad deeds can already be seen during the Punishment of the Grave, and that the spiritual pain caused by this can lead to purification of the soul.

=== Judaism ===
Rabbinic literature offers many traditions about angels chastising the dead. In Jewish religious books, the souls of the wicked are punished in the hereafter by Dumah and three subordinate angels of destruction. They are only released from their suffering on Shabbat (the Jewish sabbath). Dutch Orientalist Arent Jan Wensinck (1882–1939) said that the Jewish belief in punishment in the grave comes from a period after Islam, and that it influenced Judaism rather than Judaism influencing Islam.

== See also ==
- Barzakh
- Islamic view of death
- Sheol (Judaism)
- Siahat-e Gharb
