= Seh Gonbad =

Seh Gonbad (Persian: سه گنبد) may refer to:

- Seh Gonbad, North Khorasan
- Seh Gonbad, Razavi Khorasan
