= Chukanlu =

Chukanlu or Chowkanloo (Persian: چوكانلو) may refer to:

- Chukanlu, Faruj
- Chukanlu, Shirvan
