= Aqa Najafi Quchani =

Shia Muslim scholar of 14th century AH

- آقا نجفی قوچانی
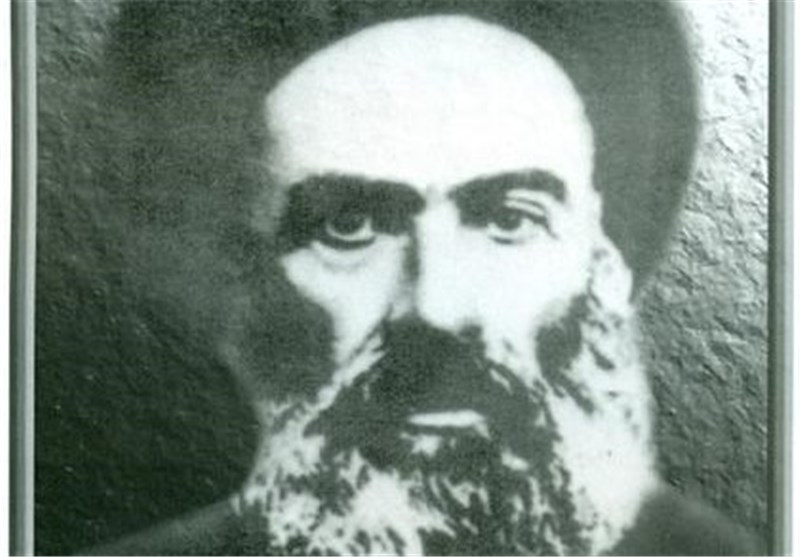
- Born: Seyyed Mohammad Hassan Hosseini Quchani; 1878; Khosraviyeh, North Khorasan, Iran
- Died: 28 April 1944 (aged 65–66); Quchan, Iran
- Burial place: Quchan
- Education: Ijtihad level of Islamic Seminary
- Occupations: Religious scholar, author
- Known for: Siahat-e Gharb; Siahat-e Shargh
- Parents: Seyyed Mohammad (father); Zolal (mother)

Seyyed Mohammad Hassan Hosseini Quchani (Persian: سید محمد حسن حسینی قوچانی), known as Aqa Najafi Quchani (Persian: آقا نجفی قوچانی) was one of the Islamic scholars and jurists of the fourteenth century AH. He was one of the disciples of Muhammad Kadhim Khorasani and reached the degree of ijtihad at the age of 30. Aqa Najafi Quchani wrote the famous books Siahat-e Gharb and Siahat-e Shargh.

== Birth and lineage ==
Aqa Najafi Quchani was born in 1878 in Khosraviyeh, North Khorasan, Iran. He was the son of Seyyed Mohammad, a farmer with basic education and Zolal the mother with Kurdish lineage. Aqa Najafi Quchani's grandfather was also named Seyyed Javad.

== Education ==
The father of Aqa Najafi Quchani was very interested in educating his children. He sent Aqa Najafi Quchani to teach in local school of Khosraviyeh village at an early age, so Aqa Najafi Quchani had learned the whole book of Quran before the age of seven. In a short period of time, he completed the usual Persian and Arabic lessons and the preparations of that time in the village house school. he also learned courses such as literature, geometry and arithmetic there. At the age of 13, his father sent him to Quchan for further education.

After studying in Quchan for three years, he went to Mashhad where he studied Islamic seminary sciences and literature. In 1895 at the age of 19 he went to Isfahan and there he studied philosophy under Akhund Mullah Mohammad Kashani and Islamic jurisprudence under Abdolkarim Gazi and wisdom under Jahangir Khan Ghashghaei.

In 1900, at the age of 23, he went to Najaf and there he began to studying specialized levels of Islamic seminary sciences, first under Muhammad Kadhim Khorasani. Fethullah Qa'ravi Isfahani and Mohammad Bagher Estahbanati were also among his teachers. Finally he completed specialized levels of Islamic seminary sciences and reached the level of ijtihad (the ability of deduce the laws in Islamic jurisprudence) at the age of 30.

== Spouse and children ==
Aqa Najafi Quchani married twice. First on 23 October 1907, he married a girl belonging to an Iranian family living in Karbala named Sakineh Beigum, and from her he had four daughters and a son in Iraq. Aqa Najafi Quchani's two daughters and a son died in Iraq and were buried in Wadi-us-Salaam cemetery, bringing with him two other twin girls to Iran. In 1939, two years after the death of his first wife, he remarried and had two sons, Ali and Mahdi, from his second wife, Fatemeh Beigum.

== Return to Quchan ==
In 1920, after 20 years, Aqa Najafi Quchani returned to Iran from Najaf, because of his father's death. He first went to Mashhad for pilgrimage of Imam Reza Shrine. After a short stop in Mashhad, he entered the city of Quchan at the request of the people of Quchan and remained there for the rest of his life. He spent more than 25 years of his life as a jurist and religious premier in Quchan and worked as the director and teacher in the Islamic seminary of Quchan.

== Bibliography ==
Aqa Najafi Quchani's most famous works are Siahat-e Gharb and Siahat-e Shargh. He has other works in the field of Islamic jurisprudence, principles of Islamic jurisprudence, Islamic mysticism, ethics and travel writing. Among his works, the following works can be mentioned:

- Sharhe Doaye Sabaah (Persian: شرح دعای صباح, English meaning: Description of the Sabah Supplication): Aqa Najafi Quchani translated the Sabah Supplication attributed to Imam Ali from Arabic into Persian and explained it in this work. manuscript, 1909.
- Ozre Badtar az Gonaah (Persian: عذر بدتر از گناه, English meaning: Excuse worse than sin): About Persian Constitutional Revolution, the composition of this treatise is a mixture of Arabic and Persian prose. 1910.
- Siahat-e Shargh (Persian: سیاحت شرق, English meaning: The Journey to the East): This work is one of Aqa Najafi Quchani's most important works and is about the events of his life from the beginning, the report of his education in the cities of Quchan, Mashhad and Isfahan and how he entered Najaf and his final education until reaching the degree of ijtihad. In this book, Aqa Najafi Quchani described the life story and hardships of his studies and described Islamic issues and teachings in a simple pen based on Quran verses and hadiths. In this book, the reader gets acquainted with the scientific points and events of that time. Because Aqa Najafi Quchani himself was in Najaf at the beginning of the Persian Constitutional Revolution, he described in detail the historical events and the reaction of the constitutional movement in Iraq, especially in Najaf. Issues of education and self-cultivation can also be seen in this book. 1928.
- Siahat-e Gharb (Persian: سیاحت غرب, English meaning: The Journey to the West): In the quality of the purgatory world and the journey of spirits after death from Islamic perspective. manuscript, 1933.
- Sharh va Tarjomeye Resaleye Tofaahieh (Persian: شرح و ترجمه رسالة تُفّاحیّه, English meaning: Explanation and translation of the rhetorical treatise): Description of "the rhetorical treatise" of Aristotle translated into Persian by Afdal al-Din Kashani, manuscript, 1935.
- Esbate Rajʽat (Persian: اثبات رجعت, English meaning: The proof of Rajʽa): Arabic and Persian, manuscript, 1942.
- Safari Kotaah beh Abadihaye Quchan (Persian: سفری کوتاه به آبادی‌های قوچان, English meaning: A short trip to the settlements of Quchan): Aqa Najafi Quchani also dealt with the social and religious situation of the villagers in this work.
- Hayat al-Islam fi Ahvale Ayah al-Malek al-Allam (Arabic: حیات الاسلام فی احوال آیه الملک العلام, English meaning: The life of Islam in the conditions of the all-knowing king): Biography of Muhammad Kadhim Khorasani along with the text of his telegrams to Iran and other countries.
- Hashieh bar Kefayah al-osul (Persian: حاشیه بر کفایه الاصول, English meaning: Description on the Kefayah al-osul): Explanation of the book Kefayah al-osul written by Muhammad Kadhim Khorasani.
- Safarhaye Seh Ganeh az Asfare Arbaeh (Persian: سفرهای سه گانه از اسفار اربعه, English meaning: Triple journey of the four journeys): Description of three important journeys in Aqa Najafi Quchani life revived from manuscripts.
- Safare Cheharom az Asfare Arbaeh (Persian: سفر چهارم از اسفار اربعه, English meaning: The fourth journey of the four journeys): Description of last important period of the Aqa Najafi Quchani life revived from manuscripts.
- Ma'aade Khodemani (Persian: معاد خودمانی, English meaning: Resurrection in intimate definition): About death and the afterlife, combination of two books "Manazil al-Akhirah" written by Abbas Qomi and Siahat-e Gharb written by Aqa Najafi Quchani.
- Siahate Shargh va Gharb (Persian: سیاحت شرق و غرب, English meaning: The Journey to the East and the West): A collection of descriptions of Aqa Najafi Quchani's travels and life and his spiritual revelations.
- Sargozashte Arvaah dar Aalame Barzakh, Matne Saadeh Shodeye Siahat-e Gharb (Persian: سرگذشت ارواح در عالم برزخ، متن ساده شده سیاحت غرب, English meaning: The Fate of Souls after Death, simplified text of Siahat-e Gharb): Rewriting and simplifying of the book Siahat-e Gharb.
- Seiri dar Zamaan va Makaane Barzakhi Montahi beh Zohoore Mahdi (Persian: سیری در زمان و مکان برزخی منتهی به ظهور مهدی (ع), English meaning: A journey in the time and place of purgatory leading to the reappearance of Mahdi): Description of the book "Siahat-e Gharb" with the meaning of difficult Arabic words and sentences into Persian.

== Reception ==
Many Islamic scholars such as Morteza Motahhari (Iranian philosopher) and Ali Khamenei (Marja' and supreme leader of Iran) praised Aqa Najafi Quchani's works (especially "Siahat-e Gharb" and "Siahat-e Shargh" books) and encouraged others to read his works.

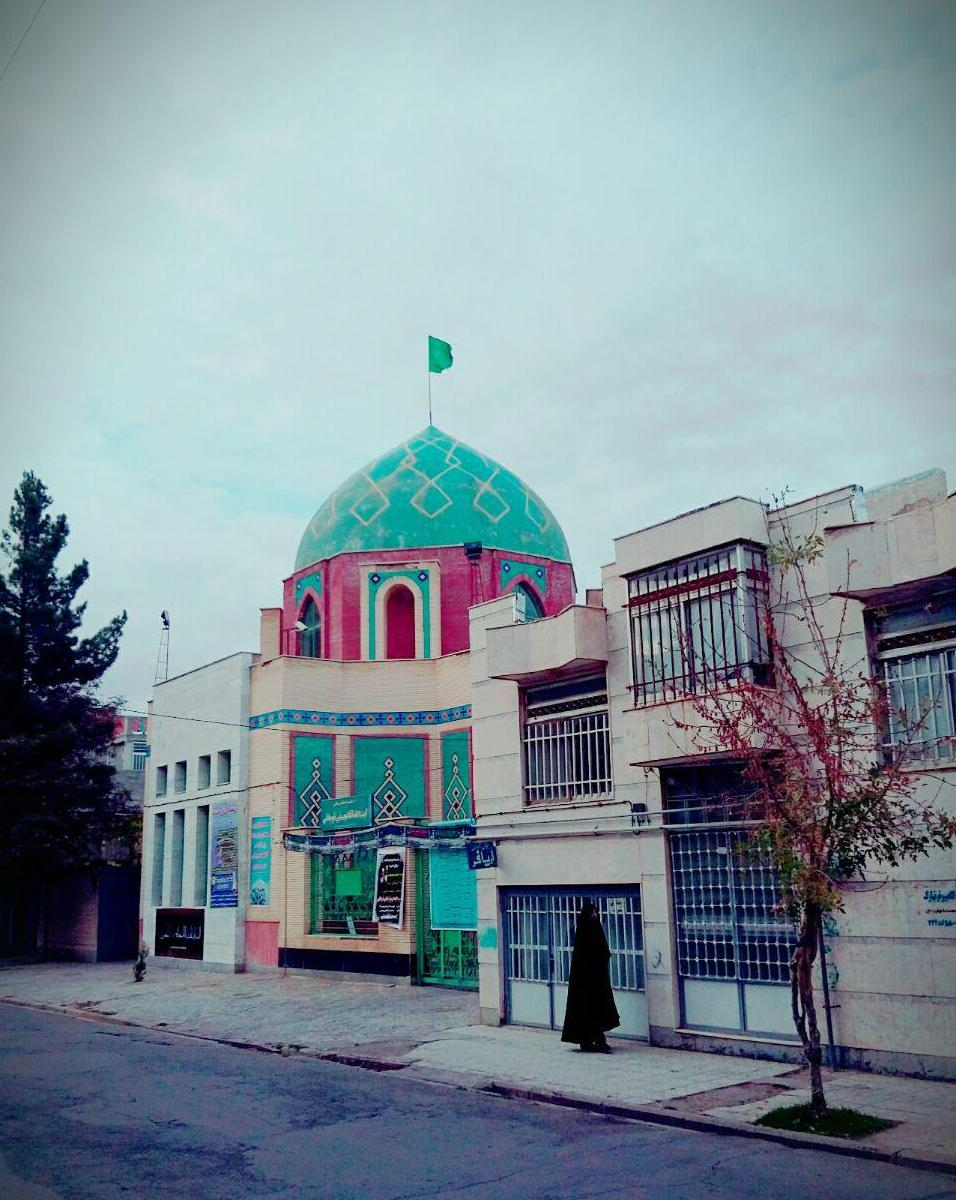
The tomb of Aqa Najafi Quchani, Quchan, Quchan County, Razavi Khorasan Province, Iran.

== Death ==
Aqa Najafi Quchani died on 20 April 1944 in Quchan, Iran and was buried in the house where he was studying. Years later, with the help of the people and city officials, a tomb was built on his grave.

== See also ==
- Agha Hossein Khansari
- Mohammad Ibrahim Kalbasi
- Muhsin al-Hakim
- Mirza-ye Qomi
- Zakaria ibn Idris Ash'ari Qomi
- Seyyed Mohammad Hojjat Kooh Kamari
- Ahmad ibn Ishaq Ash'ari Qomi
- Zakaria ibn Adam Ash'ari Qomi
- Seyed Reza Bahaadini
