= Siahat-e Shargh =

1928 autobiography of an Islamic scholar

- Author: Aqa Najafi Quchani
- Original title: سیاحت شرق
- Language: Persian
- Subject: Biography of the author
- Genre: memoirs; autobiography
- Publication date: 1928
- Publication place: Iran

Siahat-e Shargh (Persian: سیاحت شرق, The Journey to the East) is a book in Persian written by Aqa Najafi Quchani (1878-1944). This book is the biography of the author, which was written in 1928. Expressing moral sermons, historical lessons and mentioning Shiite Islamic teachings and some critical socio-political issues in the form of memoirs, reporting on the situation of the people of Iran and Iraq and Islamic seminaries and some historical events are among the contents of this book. Popular and humorous literature, brevity, the use of local expressions, the use of proverbs, the extensive use of poetic evidence and fascinating illustrations are some of the most important written features of Siahat-e Shargh.

== Synopsis ==
The author Aqa Najafi Quchani, in the book Siahat-e Shargh, in a simple tone describes important historical events of his life and experiences such as Persian constitutionalism, petty tyranny in political history of Iran, the battle of Iranian freedom seekers and the First World War along with his memoirs. The book Siahat-e Shargh which is the autobiography of Aqa Najafi Quchani, is a valuable source in clarifying the role of the clergies and the seminary of Najaf in the historical events of that period. It includes important material from the events of the contemporary history of Iran and Iraq, to more detailed issues like the behavior of the clergies with the people, the rules of the Islamic seminaries, and so on.

During his studies, the author Aqa Najafi Quchani traveled from his native village Khosraviyeh to Quchan, then to Mashhad, and in the following years to Isfahan and Najaf. The author, at the age of 16, comes to Mashhad from Quchan for more education. There he learns the basics of Islamic sciences. During his stay in Mashhad, he encounters problems and finally decides to go to Isfahan with one of his friends. They went to Yazd on foot through Tabas and its vast deathly deserts, and from there they went to Isfahan with great difficulty, faced many dangers on the way, but finally reached their destination. Then, they settled in the Araban school and mosque in Isfahan, and started studying again. In the continuation of the story, it turns out that the life and education of the author Aqa Najafi Quchani in Isfahan is very difficult and sad due to the unhealthy government situation at the time that made life difficult for the people. Aqa Najafi Quchani then goes to Najaf to change his living conditions and continue his education. In this episode, he describes the famine situation in Najaf due to the siege by the British army. In the meantime, the role of the clergy in fighting this widespread corruption and their support for the masses has been mentioned.

== Author ==
The author of the book, Aqa Najafi Quchani (1878-1944), is one of the Iranian Shiite scholars of the late of Qajar dynasty and the early of Pahlavi dynasty era. He is buried in Quchan. In addition to the book Siahat-e Shargh, he has several books, such as Siahat-e Gharb, which is about the afterlife and the purgatory world based on Islamic perspective of the death.

== Motivation and purpose of writing ==
The author seems to have had three goals and motivations for writing the book:

1. Expressing moral sermons, historical lessons and mentioning Shiite Islamic teachings and some critical socio-political issues in the form of his memoirs. Considering what the author mentioned in the first lines of the book, this can be said as his main motivation; Choosing an attractive style of writing memoirs to reduce the reader's boredom and thus increase the impact of the book's moral and epistemological content reflects this motivation. The author writes at the beginning of the book:
  "The history of one of the scholars and the events of his life and his story that what he saw, heard and understood and what happened to him, its not a treatise without contradiction and doubt and without lies and slander, and will not be useless and guarantees acquainting of the unaware and awakening of the torpid if they see with the eyes that get lessons."
  — Aqa Najafi Quchani, Siahat-e Shargh
2. Report on the situation of the people of Iran and Iraq and the seminaries and some historical events of their time and ...;
3. Writing a book to study people who turn to some books for hobby.

== Writing style ==
The general style of the book is memoir. In many cases, Aqa Najafi Quchani, in addition to his memoirs, has mentioned the sermon and expression of Islamic teachings and religious rules, and has mentioned many Quran verses, Hadith narrations and moral poems in this regard. By adopting this method, Aqa Najafi Quchani has clearly returned to the old method of traditional Islamic biography writing: he, like other Islamic famous scholars such as Harith al-Muhasibi and Al-Ghazali, attached great importance to the instructive and moral content of his memoirs.

In some parts, while keeping the memoir format of the text, he mentions and discusses the issues of Islamic jurisprudence. In some cases, the author also mentions non-religious sciences such as philosophy, medicine, and geography in the form of memoirs; Of course, the mentioned method and style in some cases make the reader tired due to the complexity or specialization of the discussion or high detail.

By describing the hardships of his life and those around him, he indirectly evokes the general atmosphere of the society of that day in Iran and Iraq in the minds of the audience. But with spoken literature and humor, he eliminates the sadness of the story.

The use of local expressions, the use of proverbs that are sometimes slang and sometimes literary, the extensive use of poetic materials, creative imagery, omnific descriptions, the use of paradoxical facades are some of the other literary attractions of the book Siahat-e Shargh.

== Correction and printing ==
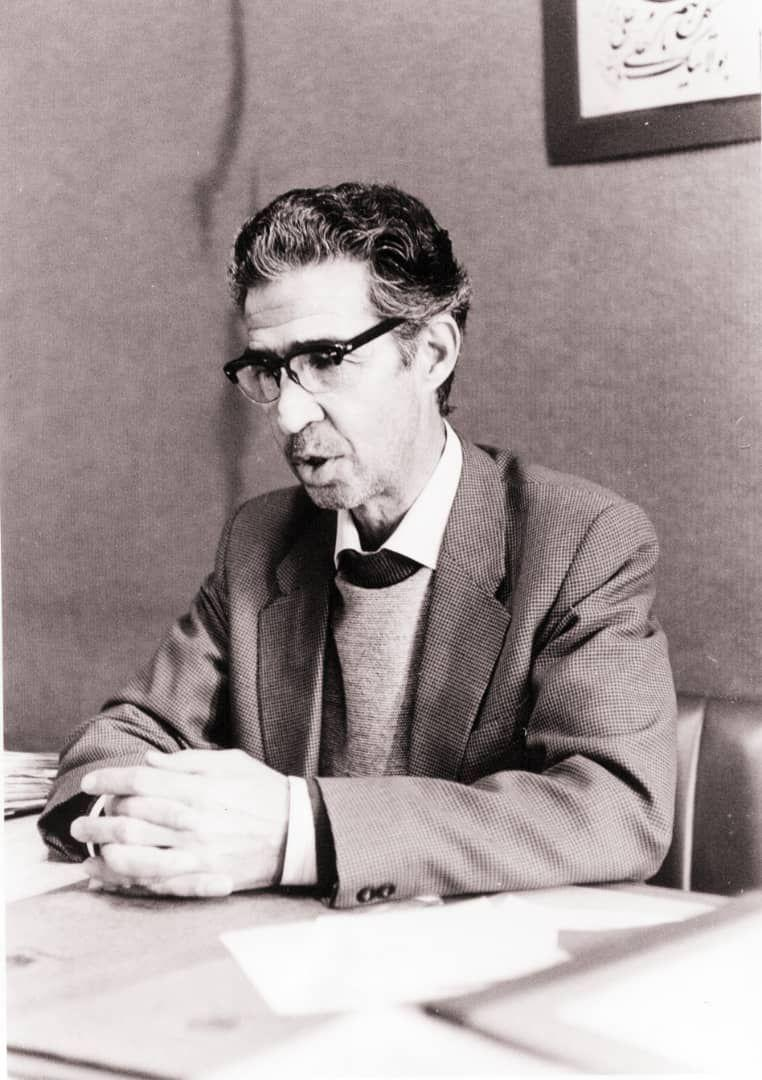
R. A. Shakeri

The book Siahat-e Shargh is the autobiography of Aqa Najafi Quchani, originally written in 1928. This book was corrected and revised from original manuscripts by Ramezan Ali Shakeri in 1972 and was published in Iran, which was very well received. According to the corrector, Ramezan Ali Shakeri, "two versions of manuscript of this book, one in 403 pages in Octavo size format and the other in 198 pages in Quarto size format, are in the possession of the relatives of the deceased author, which was written in 1928 in the handwriting of Aqa Najafi Quchani" and both versions has been used to produce final corrected book. The author has not categorized the book of Siahat-e Shargh into specific titles and chapters and the corrector has organized it to facilitate the work in terms of categorizing of the contents and also to preserve the intact text, titles and other scattered texts. The corrector has also used "the help of relevant scholars and professors and the relevant books and references" in explaining some of the contents of the book, which he has mentioned in the footnotes.

== See also ==
- Siahat-e Gharb
- Alef-Laam Khomeini
- Sharh-e Esm
