= Maut Ka Manzar =

1973 Urdu book by Khawaja Muhammad Islam

Maut Ka Manzar maa Marnay Ke Baad Kiya Hoga
- Author: Khawaja Muhammad Islam
- Language: Urdu
- Genre: Religion
- Published: 1973
- Publisher: Idara Ashayat e Deeniyat, Lahore
- Publication place: Pakistan
- Pages: 384
- ISBN: 9780686639152

Maut Ka Manzar maa Marnay Ke Baad Kya Hoga (Urdu: موت کا منظر مع مرنے کے بعد کیا ہو گا) is a 1973 Urdu Islamic book by Khawaja Muhammad Islam. The book has been translated into several languages, including English under the title The Spectacle of Death and Glimpses of Life Hereafter.

== Synopsis ==
Maut Ka Manzar is about narratives of the Islamic eschatology. The book consists of eight chapters:

1. The Spectacle of Death
2. Accounts of Barzakh
3. Accounts of Day of Resurrection
4. Accounts of Hell
5. Visions of Paradise
6. Effects of Moral Crimes on Faith
7. Signs of Doomsday
8. Pure Pearls.

The author has presented the subject with the verses of the Quran, the hadiths, the detailed sayings and experiences of the saints.

== Honors ==
Maut Ka Manzar was a best-seller in the 1970s and the 1980s and the author Khawaja Muhammad Islam rose to fame due to the book. He was then awarded by the Saudi government for writing the book.
