= Munkar and Nakir =

Islamic eschatological angels

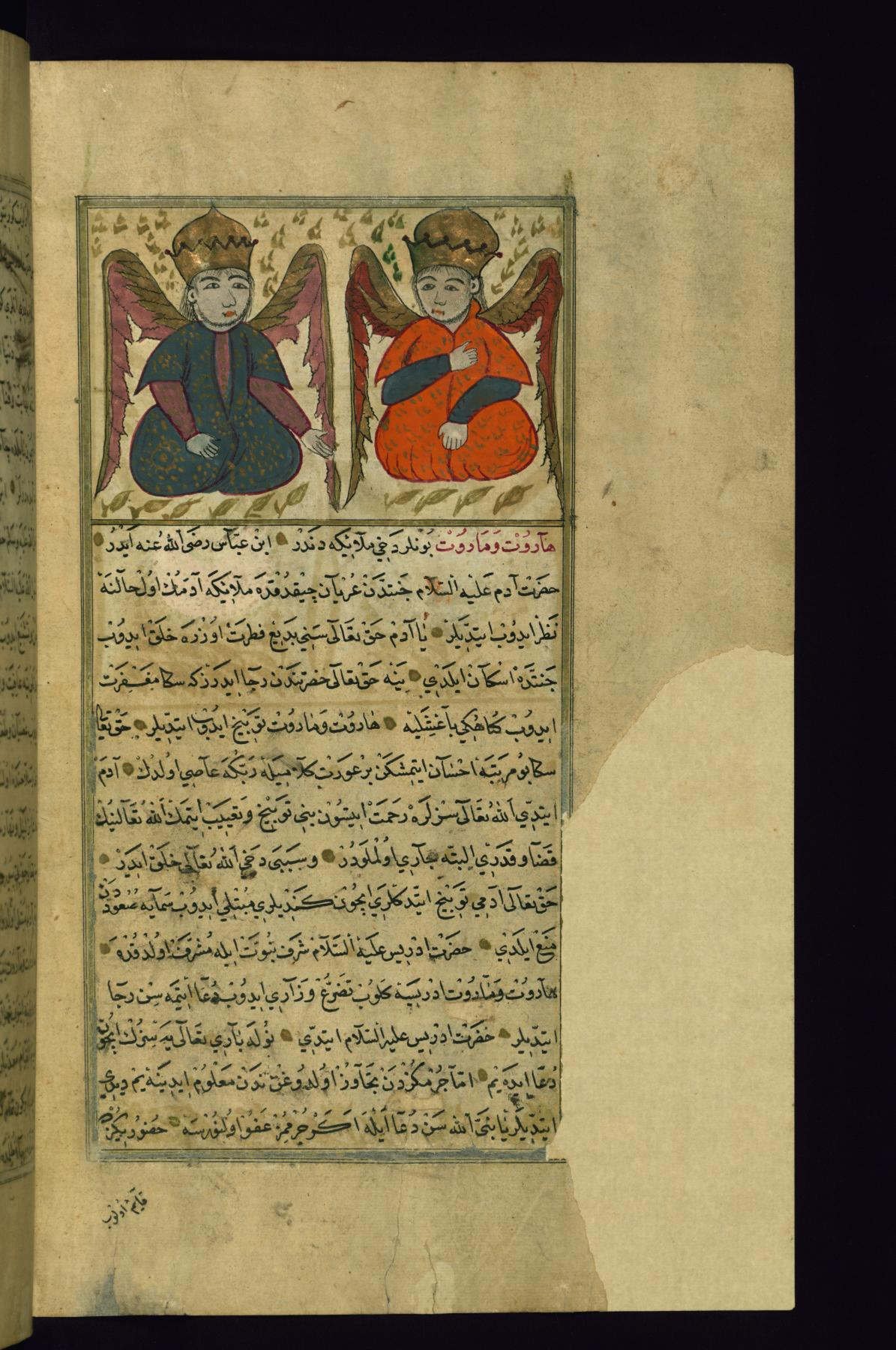
This illustration from Walters manuscript W.659 depicts the angels Munkir and Nakir, who are charged with questioning the deceased people.

Munkar and Nakir (Arabic: منكر ونكير) (English translation: "The Denied and The Denier") in Islamic eschatology, are angels who test the faith of the dead in their graves.

== Scripture ==
There is no reference to Munkar and Nakir in the Quran. Their names are first mentioned by Tirmidhi in the hadith tradition. However, the Quran alludes to them.

"And if you could but see when the angels take the souls of those who disbelieved... They are striking their faces and their backs and [saying], "Taste the punishment of the Burning Fire."

— Saheeh International

And if you could but see when the wrongdoers are in the overwhelming pangs of death while the angels extend their hands,1 [saying], "Discharge your souls! Today you will be awarded the punishment of [extreme] humiliation for what you used to say against Allāh other than the truth and [that] you were, toward His verses, being arrogant.

— Saheeh International

== Description ==
Al-Suyuti quoted from Ibn Abi al-Dunya, Al-Bayhaqi, and Musnad al-Bazzar that when Munkar and Nakir spoke, tongues of fire come from their mouths. If one answers their questions incorrectly, one is beaten every day, other than Friday, until God (Allah) gives permission for the beating to stop. Al-Suyuti also mentioned from the hadith about Munkar and Nakir digging through the earth to reach the dead person using their teeth, and that their hair reaches their feet. Meanwhile, Al-Suyuti described from Hadith recorded Al-Hakim al-Nishapuri and from Sunan Abu Dawood Munkar and Nakir carrying hammers "so large, that [they] cannot be moved even if whole of mankind unite to lift [them]".

== Questionings in the grave ==
Muslims believe that after a person dies, his soul passes through a stage called barzakh, where it exists in the grave. The questioning will begin when the funeral and burial is over. Nakir and Munkar prop the deceased soul upright in the grave and ask three questions:

1. Who is your Lord?
2. What is your religion?
3. Who is your prophet?

A righteous believer will respond correctly, saying that their Lord is Allah, that Islam is their religion, and that Muhammad is their prophet. If the deceased answers correctly, the time spent awaiting the resurrection is pleasant and they may enter heaven. Those who do not answer as described above are chastised until the day of judgment. There is a belief that the fire of Hell can already be seen in barzakh and that the spiritual pain caused by this can lead to purification of the soul.

Shia theologian al-Mufid reports that the angels ask about one's iman. The correct answer appears to be the Quran.

The questioning of the grave is part of the Islamic Creed according to Ash'ari.

Muslims believe that a person will correctly answer the questions not by remembering the answers before death but by their iman (faith) and deeds such as salat (prayer) and shahadah (the Islamic profession of faith).

== Cultural interpretations ==
Munkar and Nakir bear some similarity to Zoroastrian divinities. Some of these, such as Mithra, Sraosha and Rashnu have a role in the judgement of souls. Rashnu is described as a figure who holds a set of scales, like some angels of the grave. E.G. Brown has suggested that a continuity exists between Rashnu and Munkar and Nakir. Sebastian Günther also points out it. He writes that "the image and function of Munkar and Nakīr carries certain echoes of the Zoroastrian concept of the angels Srōsh (“Obedience”) and Ātar (“Fire”)". A mythical figure in Mandaean religion, Abathur Muzania is similar to Rashnu. He has the same position in the world of the dead and he holds a set of scales. Muzania means scales (mizan) in Aramaic.

According to a recent research, it is hypothesized that Munkar and Nakir were derived from astrological figures that originally associated with the Mesopotamian astral god Nergal. This is based on idea that the Mesopotamian god Nergal has almost the same characteristics as Munkar and Nakir. First of all, Assyrian nakru which means 'enemy', was an epithet of Nergal. The Assyrian nakru, like the names Munkar and Nakir, comes from the same root, that is, it comes from the proto-Semitic NKR which derived some negative terms. Some scholars use a different spelling; nakuru, which is almost the same as Nakir. Moreover, Nergal is a lord of the Underworld and the grave (Assyrian qabru: grave). Like Munkar and Nakir, he has a terrifying voice that can cause panic among men and gods. He holds a shining mace and his breath can burn his enemies. Because he is related to fire, most scholars suggest that he was originally a sun god. Furthermore, he is identified with the celestial twins (Gemini) in the Babylonian astral mythology, which forms a direct link to Munkar and Nakir.

The Mesopotamians still believed in the sun god Shamash, as well as Nergal and several other Babylonian gods at the time Islam was introduced. Thus, Nergal the god of the Underworld who is symbolized by the planet Mars, is a possible prototype for Munkar and Nakir. Astrologically, Munkar and Nakir share more clues in their Martian characteristics which connect them to Nergal.

In stark contrast, scholar A. J. Wensinck found the association of Munkar and Nakir to the root NKR to be unlikely. Similarly, scholar John MacDonald believes the names of the two angels have not been satisfactorily explained, although given that they are in the passive form, they may be understood as "unknown" or "disguised", much in the same way how angels visit graves in disguise in Judaism. Rabbinic literature offers many traditions about punishing angels, chastising the dead.

== See also ==
- List of angels in theology
- Barzakh
- Dumah
- Nergal
- Punishment of the Grave
- Zabaniyya
- Siahat-e Gharb
