= Siahat-e Gharb =

1933 book by Aqa Najafi Quchani

- Author: Aqa Najafi Quchani
- Original title: سیاحت غرب
- Language: Persian; Arabic; English
- Subject: Afterlife, Barzakh
- Genre: Religious; Horror; Metaphysics
- Publication date: 1970 (originally written in 1933)
- Publication place: Iran

Siahat-e Gharb (Persian: سیاحت غرب, The Journey to the West) or The Fate of Souls after Death is a book by Aqa Najafi Quchani (1878-1944). The book narrates the story of the afterlife and the purgatory world in the form of a story based on Islamic perspective of the death. Aqa Najafi Quchani has formed the story based on the hadiths received from the Shiite Imams about the purgatory. The book has been published many times by various publishers. In 2003, a film was made based on this book.

== Author ==
The author of the book, Aqa Najafi Quchani (1878-1944), is one of the Iranian Shiite scholars of the late of Qajar dynasty and the early of Pahlavi dynasty era. He is buried in Quchan. In addition to the book Siahat-e Gharb, he has several books, such as Siahat-e Shargh, which is his autobiography.

== Content and subject ==
The book discusses the purgatory world after death and the events that happen to man from Islamic perspective. Siahat-e Gharb is written originally in Persian language and some people such as Morteza Motahhari and Seyyed Abdollah Fateminia also consider it as the spiritual journey of Aqa Najafi Quchani.

Aqa Najafi Quchani has introduced the book as his purgatory reports and narrated it in first person. The prose of Siahat-e Gharb belongs to the early fourteenth century SH and it uses many Arabic and Islamic religious expressions. Verses and hadiths have not been translated in the text of the book and are in Arabic.

The narration of the book Siahat-e Gharb begins with the sentence "And I am dead" and simply puts the audience in a different place. This sentence is one of the most memorable, general and popular examples of the beginning of the scheme (opening). The whole story is based on this sentence in the afterlife and the Barzakh world.

== Publishing ==
The book Siahat-e Gharb was rewritten about more than 50 years ago by Ramazan Ali Shakeri Quchani, the then director of the Astan Quds Razavi Library, based on the old manuscripts of Aqa Najafi Quchani. Siahat-e Gharb originally was written in 1933 and it was first widely published in 1970 in Iran. The book was immediately welcomed by the people and as a result, it reprinted again in 1972.

This book has been very popular since its publication and various publishers have made efforts to publish this book. This book has been translated into Arabic, French and English.

== Film ==
A film was made in 2003 based on the book of Siahat-e Gharb in Iran. This film, like the original book, was well received by the people. The filmmakers described the film's brochure as the "resurrection therapy". One of the features of this film is that along with the dialogues of the film actors, verses from the Quran are subtitled in accordance with those dialogues. The film has been extended to three episodes so far, also dubbed in Urdu, Arabic and English.

== See also ==
- Barzakh
- Islamic eschatology
- Akhirah
- Last Judgment
- Munkar and Nakir
- Punishment of the Grave
- As-Sirāt
