= Zabaniyah =

Angels who torture sinners in hell according to Islam

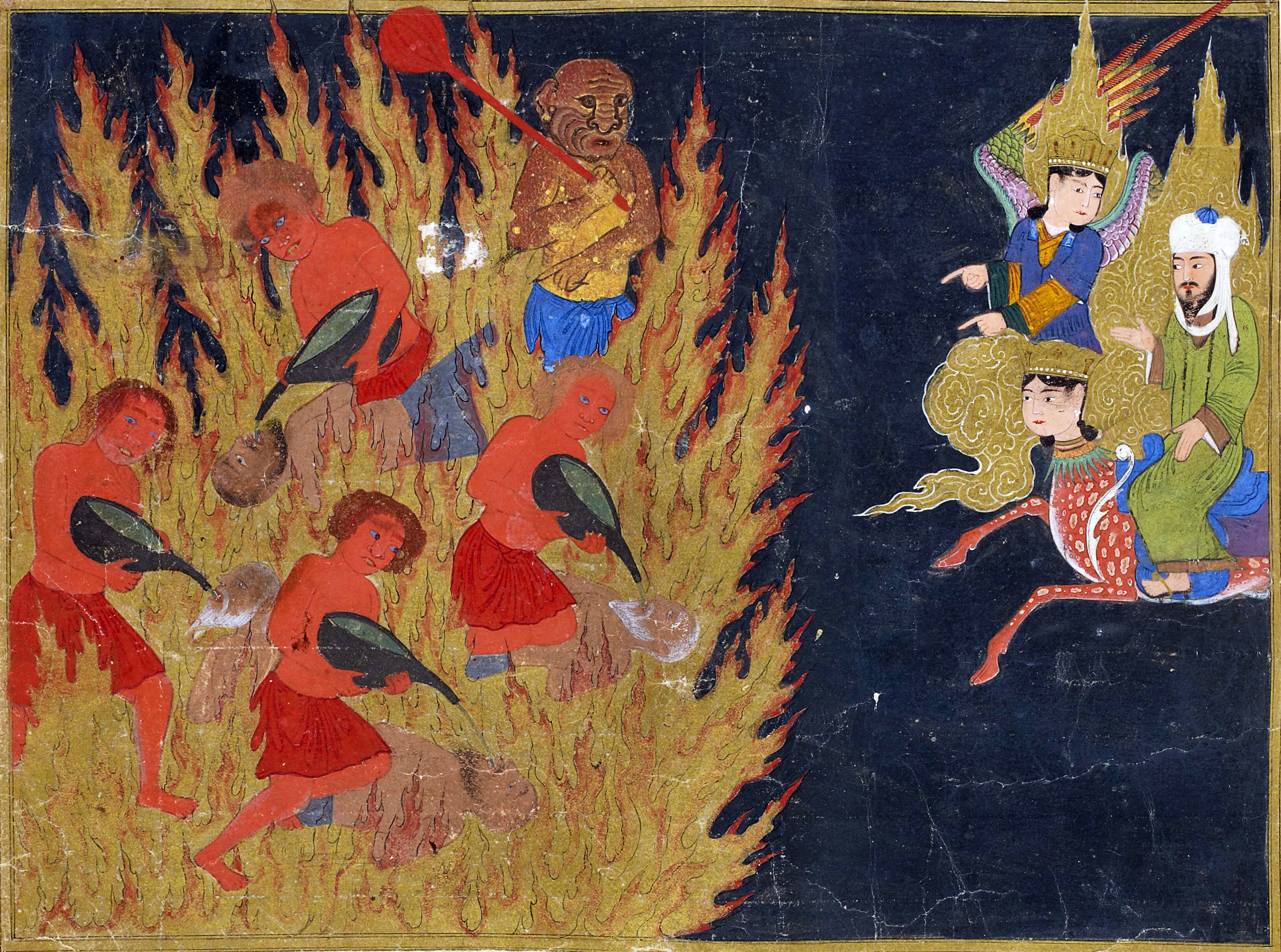
Zabaniyah torture sinners in Hell (Jahannam) in a 1436 CE illumination

The Zabaniyya (Arabic: الزبانية, romanized: az-zabāniya) are the "Wardens of hell" (Arabic: خَزَنَةِ جَهَنَّمَ, romanized: khazanati jahannam), who torture the sinners or carry of the souls of the wicked. They are identified with the "Nineteen angels of Hell", (Note: At-Tahrim Quran 66:6) and "Angels of punishment", (Note: Al-Muddaththir Quran 74:30) and "Guardians of Hell", and "Angels of hell".

According to the Quran and the ahadith, the Zabaniyah are nineteen in number and Maalik is their leader.

As angels, the Zabaniyya are, despite their gruesome appearance and actions, ultimately subordinate to God, and thus their punishments are considered in Islamic theology as just.

== Islamic traditions ==
According to Al-Qurtubi, Zabaniyah is a plural name a group of an angel. According to ibn Barjan, the angels of punishment are those angels who said „Will you [God] place therein one who will cause corruption and shed blood?“ questioning the creation of Adam.

Mujahid ibn Jabr defended the idea that the Zabaniyah are angels against contrary assertions. In the Turkish Mi'raj literature, the Zabaniyah are under command of the nineteen angels of punishment.

Based on a Hadith transmitted by Umar, the second Rashidun caliph, Al-Muzani and Ibn Kathir has stated that the belief to the existence of the angels who guarding hell as a part of the second article of Six Articles of Faith in Islam.

Scottish orientalist H. A. R. Gibb has recorded a tradition that while the angels of mercy are said to be created from light (nur), the angels of punishment are usually said to be created from fire (nar). However, this distinction are not universally accepted among Muslim scholars. Both Ibn Rajab, and Al-Qurtubi narrates in his exegesis on Surah 66:6 that the angels of hell were created from anger, and that tormenting creatures is to them like food for the children of Adam. Some consider the Zabaniyah to be the hell's angels' subordinates.

=== Names ===
A tradition from At-Tadhkirah, a book authored by Al-Qurtubi, recorded that one of Zabaniyah was named Daqä'il (Arabic: دقائل) accompanied the Angel of Death whenever he take the soul of a sinner. (Note: Addendum: al-Albani deemed this Hadith of Al-Qurtubi as weak in authenticity; Dha'if al-Jami'; p.301)

A Zabaniyah angel called Susāʾīl shows Muhammad the punishments of sinners in hell. However, the authority from Sahih al-Bukhari and Sahih Muslim has narrated that the one which Muhammad met during Mi'raj and shown Muhammad about hell was Maalik himself, the leader of Zabaniyah. (Note: Sahih Bukhari chains: from Muhammad ibn Bashar->Ghandar->Shu’bah->Qatada ibn Di'ama->Khalifa->Yazid bin Zurayi->Sa’id->Qatada->Abu Al-Aliyah,-> Ibn Abbas->Muhammad.) (Note: Sahih Bukhari and Sahih Muslim; Sahih al-Jami Al-Albani grading: Authentic.)

=== Etymology ===
There are several interpretation according from exegesis and linguistical experts regarding the linguistic etymology of Zabaniyah:

- Al-Qurtubi has recorded the interpretation from classical era Quran exegete Qatada ibn Di'ama. According to Qatada, the term of Zabaniyah were taken from al-Zabn, which was synonymous with Arabic verb of "payment" or "retribution". However, Qatada also stated that there are alternate etymology of Zabaniyah according to Arabian linguistic, which is also translated as "those who lead the first strike during a battle" or Shock troops.
- Al-Mubarrad suggested, zabāniya could derive from the idea of movement and the Zabaniyah are those who "push somebody [back]". This assertion also narrated by traditional Arabic linguist, Ibn Qatiya, and Epigraphy expert, Ahmed ibn Muhammad bin Ali Al-Fayoumi, in his explanation of "Z-b-n" or "act of push" in that Quranic verse mentioned Zabaniyah according to the root of Arabic language, where it is root are similar to the Arabic expression. German modern historian Rudi Paret also noted the similar meaning of the term zabani indicates a characteristical action personified in a type of spirit. In that case, the zabani would refer to a spirit whose function is pushing someone back.
  - Ahmed described the pushing movement of scorpion's pincers or Chelae, were also called Zabani, which is the same root of the angels act of Zabani or pushing sinners to hell". correspondingly, an 8th-century Arabic grammar expert from Kufa, Abu al-Hasan al-Lahyani, also stated the word of Zaban was used in Arabic to describe the claws part of the constellation Scorpius.
  - Ibn Ashur using different analogy of the word, as he said in his work, al-Tahrir wa'l-Tanwir, the word of Zaban was derived from the kicking movement of a camel's leg.
- Ibn Taymiyya quoted classical interpretations from Qatada, Ahmed ibn Muhammad, and others scholars about the interpretation of zabaniyah in his work, ar-Ra'd 'Ala al-Manthiq. Those arguments were used Ibn Taymiyya to argue against the scholars of Kalam regarding Quranic tafseer about the nature of angels.
- Ibn Hisham asserted in his chronicle, that Zabaniyah linguistically means "helpers", which singular noun are Zibniyah.
- Ahmad Y. Hassan, one of founders of PERSIS, has interpreted in his exegesis work Tafsir al-Furqan that the Zabaniyah etymologically as "mighty soldiers of Allah". Ahmad Hassan derived this interpretation from view of Al-Qurtubi's personal interpretation which translate Zabaniyah as a police.

=== Number ===
Regarding the numbers of Zabaniyah, The number nineteen is found both in Quran, and Hadith Qudse. (Note: the chain of transmission regarding Zabaniyah consisting numbers was found in Hadith narrated by Amir al-Sha'bi on the authority of Al-Bara' ibn Azib.) Another hadith which recorded by Sunan al-Tirmidhi and Aḥmad ibn Mūsá Ibn Mardawayh has reported that the number of nineteen also appeared when Muhammad being tested by group of that era contemporary Jewish Rabbi to prove if he is truly a prophet, by questioning how many guardians of hell there were, which Muhammad responded as nineteen.

However, Islamic scholars all agreed that the number of nineteen here only meant for the archangels, or leaders of the angels of hell. al-Qurtubi has reported another classical exegesis addendum that their number is nineteen thousands. Meanwhile, modern Saudi Grand mufti Abd al-Aziz Ibn Baz has mentioned number of 4,900,000,000 angels which keeping hell, where each 70,000 of them holding a bridle from 70,000 bridles which restraining Jahannam. (Note: Sahih Muslim 2842 Muhammad Al-Munajjid (2003). "إن الله شديد العقاب" [Verily, God is severe in punishment] (in Arabic). Saudi: IslamQA.info.)

The concilliatory explanation regarding conflicting exegesises about numbers according to al-Qurtubi, that the nineteen angels refers to the leaders of those angels, including Malik, While the insurmountable numbers was referring to the hell angels which were led by those nineteen Zabaniyah. While modern scholar Muhammad Sulaiman al-Ashqar, professor from Islamic University of Madinah, further explained it meant as nineteen types of punisher angels in hell, which the exegete scholars based its from the additional interpretation from the following verse, the 31st verse which stated "none know their numbers except Allah.".

=== Physical description ===
There are several features of Zabaniyah which describe their physical according various traditions and classical Quranic exegesis:

- Face. Several Hadith as recorded that Muhammad has met Malik, the leader of Zabaniyah, in one occasion and described that Maalik has sickeningly ugly face. (Note: Ibn Hisham narrated in his book about this Hadith, Similar Hadith also recorded by Muhammad al-Bukhari. (Note: Sahih al-Bukhari on the authority of Samura ibn Jundab.)) Ibn Hisham also recorded another Hadith, that the true face of Zabaniyah angels are so repulsive beyond comprehension, to the point that any living human could die by the shock of only looking at their face. (Note: Ibn Hisham criticize this transmission has weakness in its chain.) Aside from those Isra' and Mi'raj tradition, Muhammad also noting the gruesome appearance of Malik in his dream, in another tradition recorded by Ibn Hajar al-Asqalani, The face of Maalik is "very unpleasant". (Note: Fath al-Bari commentary by Ibn Hajar al-Asqalani.)
  - The eyes of Zabaniyah were like lightning and their mouths were like Spurs of chicken, while their hairs is so long to the point its dragged under their feet. (Note: Al Haba'ik Fi Akhbar Al Mala'ik, al-Suyuti; Hadith transmitted by Ibn al-Mundhir from Abu Bakr Ibn Mujāhid.) This also noted by modern researcher Christian Lange from the classical exegesis works, that zabaniyah have "repulsive faces, eyes like flashing lightening, teeth white like cows horns, lips hanging down to their feet, and rotten breath". (Note: According to Al-Baghawi, this traditional descriptionary about the eyes, mouth, and hair of Zabaniyah were found in a hadith of the prophet with notable transmitter from Ibn Jurayj.)
- Size. The Zabaniyah, are the largest type of angel. (Note: Tafsir al-Qurtubi commentary of Al-Alaq 96:18) Al-Tabari also describing that the distance between Zabaniyah shoulders are 500 years.
  - Abdullah ibn Ahmad also narrated that the size of Zabaniyah were described that the distance between each of their shoulders were as long as the distance of 100 years of travels. While al-Baghawi records their shoulders are as wide as 1 year of journey. (Note: Tafsir al-Baghawi al-Muddathir 74:30) For the similar case, Ibn Rajab also brought a similar tradition. (Note: Hadith narration which traced from Tabi'un Abu Imran al-Jawni. Ibn Rajab reported this narration contain weakness as there is transmitter named Ibn Lahi'ah, who was notable for the weakness in memorization. However, Ibn Rajab recorded according to his colleagues that this tradition is trustworthy since it is traced before the library of Ibn Lahi'ah burned in an accident; and it was only traditions from after his library being burned that Ibn Lahi'ah's tradition were considered untrustworthy.)
  - Al-Baladhuri comments on this narration, that the angels which protected Muhammad from Abu Jahl's aggression near Ka'ba were twelve zabaniyah as tall sky.
  - Abdullah ibn al-Harith has narrated: (Note: Musnad Ahmad ibn Hanbal on the authority of Abdullah ibn al-Harith) (Note: Musannaf Ibn Abi Shaybah, Ibn Abi Shaybah; on the authority of Abdullah ibn al-Harith) "The Zabaniyah angels have placed [sic] their head in the sky and their feet on the lowest earth". Almost similar narration which also authored by Abdullah ibn al-Harith was quoted by medieval Hadith expert, Ibn Abi Hatim, which transmitted through an anonymous Atharist, although with slightly different textual: "The Zabaniyah angels have their feets in the sky and their head on the lowest earth [sic]". (Note: Commentary from Mansoor 'Abd al-Hakim said instead this tradition alternative interpretation of the Abdullah ibn Harith's tradition that "al-zabaniyat 'arjuluhum fi as Sama' wa ra'sihI fi al'ard" meant "The Zabaniyah angels are the strongests (among angels) in the sky and leaders (of angels) in earth [sic]".)
  - One of Zabaniyah has its chest as wide as one of the gate of Jahannam. (Note: This narration was deemed low in authenticity due to the existence of Ibrahim ibn al-Hakam ibn Aban in the transmission chain, which Ibn Rajab consider as weak narrator. (Note: Hadith tradition from 'Ikrimah Mawlâ Ibn 'Abbâs recorded by Ibn Rajab.))
- Tools. According to Ibn al-Jawzi, Zabaniyah angels carrying tools such as iron beater or Mirzabba(مِرْزَبَّة) with two prongs, and whip made of fire. The Zabaniyah angels used these tools to punish the sinners vigorously. According to Hasan al-Basri, the Zabaniyah will drive the sinners into hell with "iron hooks". Other than that, they also carrying hot chains for torturing inmates.
- Strength. Ibn Abi Hatim has recorded a Hadith narration from Abdullah ibn al-Harith that the Zabaniyah are the most powerful among angels.
  - The Zabaniyah angels also characterized being created by Allah to be able to perform any tasks commanded upon them to torture the inmates of hell. (Note: Tahrim 66:6; Tafsir Al-Qur’an Al-‘Azhim, Ibn Kathir 7:322; narrated from Ibn Abi Hatim recorded from his father, who transmit it from Salamah ibn al-Shabib, who transmit it form Ibrahim ibn Al-Hakam ibn Aban, who transmit it from his father, who hard the narration from Ikrimah) (Note: Tafsir as-Sa'di. Tahrim: 6) Ibn Kathir has explained that Allah has granted Zabaniyah the abilities to manage a torture for sinners which no one can emulate; and gripping strength that so severe, which no creatures could match. (Note: Al-Fajr 89:25) (Note: Al-Fajr 89:26 =أي وليس أحد أشد قبضا ووثقا من الزبانية)
  - Abu Ishaq al-Tha'labi gave his commentary about the Asbab al-Nuzul (revelation) of Quran chapter Al-Muddaththir of 30th verse, that even if entire mankind joined forces, they would not be able to defeat a single Zabaniyah angel.
  - The Zabaniyah's strength allow them to shove seventy thousand people towards hell in one sweep. (Note: identical commentary from Muhammadiyah university highlighting here the words from At-Tahrim verse 6 which describe the Zabaniyah, where Ghilaadhun (severe) were meant to be one of their characteristics of those angels does not have compassion and cruel towards those they tortured. Meanwhile, another characteristic in these verse, Shiddad (mighty or solid) meant as those angels possessed strengths that so great to the point they cannot be defeated by anyone. Tabari also stated narration from Ka'b al-Ahbar that each of Zabaniyah angels armed with two-handled staff which could beat 700,000 peoples in each of its single swing. Similar report on the authority from Ka'b al-Ahbar also came from Abu Nu'aym al-Isfahani.)
  - After the judgment day, One of Zabaniah were described as being able to drag entire sinners who are judged to enter hell while carrying a mountain on his shoulder, which he will use to crush the sinners with the said mountain, after all of them entered hell.
  - Al-Qurtubi has quoted Tafsir al-Tha'labi, that Zabaniyah has similar metaphysical capability with the Angel of death, who could take souls of many creatures at once singlehandedly, whereas the Zabaniyah angels could torture sinners at the same time no matter how many sinners existed.
  - During the Judgment day, the Zabaniyah angels will lift and dragging out Jahannam from its place to the surface of plain, where all sinners await their judgments.
  - After the Judgment day, the inmates of hell will be in blind and deaf condition. However, the Zabaniyah angels possessed ability where those deaf inmates can somehow heard the voices of Zabaniyah who tortured them. (Note: Tafsir Al-Qurtubi” (11/ 345) Al-Anbiya 21:100)
- Fingers. According to Tawus ibn Kaysan interpretation, the Zabaniyah angels possessed fingers which number equal to the number of the sinners that will be thrown into hell after the judgment day.
  - Ibn Qutaybah also further added that the fingers of the leader of Zabaniyah, Maalik, is so hot to the point that if one his finger touched the sky; that finger will cause the sky to melt.
  - Diya al-Din al-Maqdisi narrated a Hadith transmitted by Anas ibn Malik in his book, Shifah an-Nar; that Zabaniyah were created 1,000 year before hell created, while simultaneously their physical strength growing everyday, to the point that the strength of each of Zabaniyah fingers could squeeze a human from each of their crowns to their ankles. (Note: This narration also transmitted from Hasan al-Basri, to his son, Yazid, until ended on Diya al-Din al-Maqdisi.)
- Wings. Scholars noted several traditions that Zabaniyah possessed wings, as according to the hadiths of Muslim ibn al-Hajjaj, the Zabaniyah were appeared before Abu Jahl, as Muhammad prayed in the Kaaba, one of the Zabaniyah scared Abu Jahl when he tried to trample on Muhammad's neck with his foot. (Note: Al-Sirah al-Nabawiyyah (Ibn Hisham) quotation of Sahih Bukhari: on the authority of ibn Abbas) Ibn Hajar al-Asqalani explores this event in greater detail, stating that Abu Jahl was asked about his retreat whereupon he answered that he suddenly saw winged terrifying monster in a trench filled with flames, between him and Muhammad. This accident were believed by Muslims to be the Asbab al-Nuzul (revelation) of Qur'an chapter al-Alaq 96:18. (Note: Fath al-Bari; explanation of the Hadith in correspond of al-Alaq revelation) (Note: In another tradition which discussed similar case, Al-Qurtubi has mentioned that Abu Jahl witnessed Zabaniyah in a form of a horsemen or mounted knight, instead of monstrous creature.)

=== Tasks ===
Modern orientalist and Islamic expert Frederick S. Colby also recorded the description from traditional exegesis that God have made hardness into each of Zabaniyah angel's heart, for they may have no mercy towards the inmates.

==== Torturing sinners in afterlife ====
Muhammad al-Bukhari, in his commentary of his collection of Hadiths regarding afterlife (Barzakh), added that the Zabaniyah will also inflict punishments towards peoples who commit Riba or usury by pelting their mouth with rocks while forcing them to swim in river of blood. This hadith described the situation of peoples who commit usury in Barzakh, or a realm of afterlife, before the judgment day. Adam ibn Abd al-aziz describes the zabaniya as angels of death who, according to the Quran (4:97, 32:11), conduct the souls of sinners and question them in the grave. Similar to the angelic pairs Nāzi'āt and Nāshiṭāt and Munkar and Nakir, they are assisting Azrael and seize the souls of the injust. Ghazali states, they appear as black shadows to the dying person, pull their souls out of their bodies, and drag them to hell.

A detailed narration from Al-Qurtubi has recorded that after the Angel of death has separated the soul of sinner from his body, a Zabaniyah named Daqa'il will restrain the soul with a giant wrap which made from rough hairs and parading the soul to the sky, before throwing the soul towards another Zabaniyah angels, who responded by taking the soul into the Sijjin (سِجِّين), a rock-shaped prison of the sinners below the Barzakh.

==== Torturing sinners during judgment day ====
Ka'b al-Ahbar has narrated a long and detailed tradition of Non-canonical regarding the Zabaniyah role during the judgment day, where they were tasked to gather and suppress all the sinners, both Muslims and non-Muslims. Furthermore, ibn Kathir, adding commentaries from narration of hadith transmitted from Abd Allah ibn Mas'ud, that whoever wants to be saved from the torture after judgment day should recite the basmala frequently during their life, as it consists of 19 letters in accordance of the number of Zabaniyah. (Note: This correspondent was mentioned by al-Rutbi in al-Jami’ li Ahkam al-Qur’an (1/92) and Ibn Katheer in his “Tafsir” (1/18) which authored by Abd Allah ibn Mas'ud. The narration considered weak by Al-Dhahabi as he quoted the weakness of Sulaiman al-Aʽmash biography of Mizan al-I’tidal. But Al-Suyuti attributed it in “Al-Durr Al-Manthoor” (1/26) to Waki’, and Imam Waki’ bin Al-Jarrah has a famous interpretation.(See: “The National Assembly” by Al-Hafiz Ibn Hajar (p. 113), which he deems the chain of narrators is authentic.)

Classical scholars such as Muqatil ibn Sulayman and al-Mawardi interpreting surah An-Naba 78:21 mentioned those angels who guard hell dwell in hell and actively monitoring the infidels until their descent into Hell, while Muhammad Sulaiman al-Ashqar from Islamic University of Madinah also highlights these roles in the same verse. In specific, classical exegesises from Mujahid ibn Jabr, Muhammad ibn Ka'b, Al-Dahhak ibn Muzahim, Ismail ibn Abd al-Rahman as-Suddi, and Sufyan al-Thawri; all of them have agreed that one of Zabaniyah duty after the judgment day is to push those who mocked Islam into hell. (Note: At-Tur 52:17)

Ibn Abi Hatim also described Zabaniyah are leading the army of angels. (Note: Ibn Abi Hatim narrated this chain transmission of Hadith from Companions of the Prophet named 'Abd Allah ibn al-Harith.)

==== Torturing sinners in hell ====
Both modern, and classical scholars has interpreted the verse of Al-Muddaththir 69:30 about how the group of Zabaniyah throwing the sinners into Jahannam.

Hasan al-Basri has described that the task of Zabaniyah is driving sinners to enter hell. Frederick S. Colby quoted some Isra' and Mi'raj traditions: the zabaniyyat landscape of the first layer of hell and the fiery seas within, as Malik explains to Muhammad that the zabaniyya were created by God inside hell so they have no desire to leave this place and feel comfortable in it. Abdul-Rahman al-Sa'di explained The Zabaniyah are standing tall above Saqar, a place in hell.

Ibn Kathir further described that each Zabaniyah restrained the sinners who were fated to be thrown to hell are shackling each sinner's arms to their neck before dragging them down. Al-Qurtubi also adds that the zabaniyah perform their job by using both of their hands and feet in torturing sinners in hell. Ibn Kathir narrated in his Al-Bidaya wa l-Nihaya, that the Zabaniyah will drag the face of those they torture. In the more expanded details from Tafsir Ibn Kathir, it was explained the Zabaniyah will shackle the inmates, cursing them, pouring boiled water on top of their head, while at the same time force-feeding then with fruits of Zaqqum tree. (Note: Ad-Dukhan 44:47, ad-Dukhan 44:48, ad-Dukhan 44:49, ad-Dukhan 44:50)

In the interpretation of Quran chapter Al-Haqqa verse 32, both Ibn Kathir and Abdul-Rahman al-Sa'di gave their explanation that the chains in the verse were meant to be the chains which used by Zabaniyah angels to shackle the inmates in hell. However, al-Sa'di further explained more vividly as the Zabaniyah also will shoving the hot chains to the inmates rectums until it emerged from their mouth; while modern scholars such as Muhammad ibn Shalih ash-Shawi, and Muhammad Sulaiman Al-Ashqar has traced the exegesis about the torture by shoving of chains into the inmate's rectum was traced from exegesis by Sufyan al-Thawri.

As for Muslim sinners which has committed huge sins and never repented during their life, The Zabaniyah tasked to shackle them more leniently than non-Muslim, and torture them until all of their sins has paid off with the punishments inflicted, thus release them from hell and sent them all to heaven. Meanwhile, for the non-Muslim, Ka'b has described the Zabaniyah shackle and drag them more severely than Muslim sinners into hell while burning them as they walked in, then punish them for eternity. Ibn Kathir claimed there are several canon Hadith that supported this narration from Ka'b. (Note: Israʼiliyyat tradition Abu Nu'aym al-Isfahani->His father->Ahmad ibn Muhammad al-Baghdadi->Ibrahim ibn Abdullah al-Junaid->Ubaydillah ibn Muhammad ibn Aisha->Muslim al-Khawash->Furat ibn Said->Zadhan->Ka'b al-Ahbar) According to al-Qurtubi, The Zabaniyah angels will wrap the inmates of hell with a coffins which made from fire, then the said coffins will be wrapped in other coffins which nailed with a nail made of fire, so they will not hear anything, and none of those inmates can see that there is other peoples tortured nearby. (Note: Tafsir Muhammad al-Amin al-Shinqiti al-Anbiya 21:100) (Note: Tafsir Ibn Kathir (5/377) al-Anbiya 21:100. quote: Ibn Abi Hatim transmitted the interpretation of Abd Allah ibn Mas'ud)

Sufism tradition narrates regarding the fate after death has narrates that an army of angels of punishment battled against the angels of mercy over the soul of a sinner. In some Turkish lore, it is believed that when both groups battle, their strikes cause thunder.

Another task of Zabaniyah angels were found in the interpretation of medieval Sufi scholar, Ibn Barrajan (d. 1141) commentary on Sura At-Tur that Moses and Aaron are protected by zabaniyah.

== Cultural interpretation ==
Islamic art commonly pictures them as horrifying demons with flames leaping from their mouth. As part of Isma'ili eschatology, Nasir al-Din al-Tusi identified the zabaniya with the seven planets, who administer the upper barzakhs, indicating that there is a kind of hell within the celestrial spheres. Accordingly, impure souls remain imprisoned within bodies, missing salvation in purely intellectual existence. The Houris appear as counterparts of the zabaniya, who are, in contrast to the zabaniya, items of knowledge from the beyond.

Alternatively, it has been argued the term might have denoted a class of pre-Islamic demons. Al-Khansa mentions zabaniya as some sort of demon. Similar to the jinn, they would ride on animals (eagles). Hubert Grimme raised the possibility that zabaniya originally referred to a class of Arabian demons. In favor of this theory is, that the poetress convert al-Khansa mentions zabaniya in one of her poems as supernatural creatures similar to Sa'aali (a type of jinn). Further, al-Mubarrad associates zabaniya with demons. He states that afarit (a type of underworld demon) were sometimes called "ʿifriyya zibniyya". Another theory holds that this term may derive from Sumerian zi.ba.an.na ("The Scales") and Assyrian zibanitu (also referring to scales).

However, Ibn Kathir has his commentary quoting Quran Al-Muddaththir,"Over it are nineteen [angels]. And We have not made the keepers of the Fire except angels. And We have not made their number except as a trial for those who disbelieve - that those who were given the Scripture will be convinced and those who have believed will increase in faith and those who were given the Scripture and the believers will not doubt and that those in whose hearts is hypocrisy and the disbelievers will say, "What does Allah intend by this as an example?" Thus does Allah leave astray whom He wills and guides whom He wills. And none knows the soldiers of your Lord except Him. And mention of the Fire is not but a reminder to humanity."^{[Quran 74:30–31 (Translated by si)]} that the guardians of hells are only from angel race, none other. Christian Lange also argued, since none of the older codices of the Quran (Mus'haf) contain variants of this term, it is unlikely it has been changed over time. Although Lange also suggested the word Zabaniyah may have been derived from the syriac shabbāyā. Ephrem used this term for angels who conduct the souls after death.

As for the number nineteen, independent researcher Gürdal Aksoy suspects it refers to the sum of the seven planets and twelve signs of the zodiac, as found in Mandaen literature, which, while suggestive, is ultimately inconclusive. Scholars such as Richard Bell has found the evidence adduced for this apparent association to lack direct correspondence. In a similar vein, Angelika Neuwirth sees the Qur'an's reference to nineteen as an "ostentatiously enigmatic element", whereas Alan Jones suggests that "initially the meaning of 'nineteen' would have been vague."

=== Similarities with other religions ===
The idea of punishing angels appears in earlier Abrahamic literature. In the Hebrew Bible, God sents punishing angels to smite enemies (for example, Exodus 12:23). According to the Apocalypse of Paul, an angel casts the sinners into hell. In hell, such angels inflict pain on the inmates with iron hooks.

The Book of Enoch mentions punishing angels called satans who act as God's executioners on both sinful humans and fallen angels. The Apocalypse of Peter also mentions angels torturing the sinners in a place of punishment.

Like the Zabaniyah, who torture the inhabitants of hell according to divine decree, the Hell Wardens in Buddhism carry out punishment in accordance with karmic law. Yama, the judge who assignes people to hell and commands the tormentors, bears resemblances to Malik, the leader of the Zabaniyah.

== See also ==
- Archon
- Dumah (angel)
- Destroying angel (Bible)
- List of angels in theology
- Kushiel
- Maalik
- Ox-Head and Horse-Face

== Appendix ==
=== Qur'an Primary sources ===
General topic quotes:

- Nature of Zabaniyah :At-Tahrim Quran 66:6
- "Wardens of hell"; "Angels of hell"; "The keepers" :Al-Mulk Quran 67:8
- Tools of Zabaniyah :Al-Haqqa Quran 69:32
- "Nineteen Angels of Hell" :Al-Muddaththir 74:30
- Task of Zabaniyah :An-Naba Quran 78:21 al-Haqqa Quran 69:30 al-Anbiya Quran 21:100at-Tur ^{[Quran 52:17]}al-Fajr ^{[Quran 89:25-26]}
- Description of Zabaniyah :Al-Alaq Quran 96:18

Specific verses Tafsir:

=== Hadith Primary sources ===
General narratives:

- Hadith Qudse by Al-Bara' ibn Azib
- Hadith Abd Allah ibn Mas'ud
- Sunan al-Tirmidhi
- Sahih Muslim.
- Sahih al-Bukhari
- Tafsir Ibn Kathir
- Al-Durr Al-Manthur

Specific narratives:

=== Secondary sources ===
- ʻUmar Sulaymān Ashqar (2005). The World of the Noble Angels: In the Light of the Qurʼan and Sunnah. International Islamic Publishing House. ISBN 9789960672755.
- Lange, Christian (2016). Locating Hell in Islamic Traditions. Brill. ISBN 978-90-04-30136-8. JSTOR 10.1163/j.ctt1w8h1w3.
- Lange, Christian (December 2015). Paradise and Hell in Islamic Traditions. Cambridge University Press. doi:10.1017/CBO9781139014847. hdl:1874/324216. ISBN 9781139014847.
- Mansur Abdul Hakim (2015). MALAIKAT MALIK A.S: PENJAGA NERAKA [Maalik the angel PBUH: Guardian of hell] (in Malay). Karya Bestari. pp. 9–10, 15–16. ISBN 9789678605250. Wikipage: Mansoor 'Abd al-Hakim
- Shalih ibn Abdullah ibn Humaidi; Wahbah al-Zuhayli; Imad Zuhair Hafidh; Abdul-Rahman al-Sa'di; Muhammad Sulaiman al-Ashqar (18 March 2019). "Tafsir Al-Mukhtashar / Markaz Tafsir Riyadh; Tafsir Al-Muyassar Ministry of Saudi Arabia; Zubdatut Tafsir Min Fathil Qadir Islamic University of Medina; Tafsir Al-Wajiz by Wahbah al-Zuhaily; Tafsir Al-Madinah Al-Munawwarah; Tafsir as-Sa'di by Abdul-Rahman al-Sa'di; concise Tafseer by Indonesian Ministry of religious affair" (in Indonesian and Arabic). Ministry of Islamic Affairs, Dawah and Guidance; Islamic University of Madinah; Ministry of Religious Affairs (Indonesia). Explanation of Quran 74th chapter: al Muddathir
- Shalih ibn Abdullah ibn Humaidi; Wahbah al-Zuhayli; Imad Zuhair Hafidh; Abdul-Rahman al-Sa'di; Umar al-Muqbil; Hikmat ibn Bashir ibn Yasin al-Musuli (18 March 2019). "Tafsir Al-Mukhtashar / Markaz Tafsir Riyadh; Tafsir Al-Muyassar Ministry of Saudi Arabia; Zubdatut Tafsir Min Fathil Qadir Islamic University of Medina; Tafsir Al-Wajiz by Wahbah al-Zuhaily; Tafsir Al-Madinah Al-Munawwarah; Li Yaddabbaru Ayatih (Qassim University exegesis by Umar al-Muqbil); Tafsir as-Sa'di by Abdul-Rahman al-Sa'di; concise Tafseer by Indonesian Ministry of religious affair" (in Indonesian and Arabic). Qassim University; Ministry of Islamic Affairs, Dawah and Guidance; Islamic University of Madinah; Ministry of Religious Affairs (Indonesia). Explanation of Quran 66th chapter: at-Tahrim
