= Funeral prayer in absentia =

Islamic prayer

A funeral prayer in absentia, (Salat al-Gha'ib (Arabic: صلاة الغائب)), is a funeral rite performed for a deceased Muslim if their body is inaccessible or unavailable.

The Hadiths, or tradition reports of Muhammad, approved the offering of funeral prayers for an absent person. Abu Hurairah reported: "The Prophet informed his companions about the death of Negus (Najashi), the king of Abyssinia, on the day that he died. And then the Prophet led them to the prayer ground where he lined them up and offered funeral prayers for him with four Takbirs". The time for offering a funeral prayer in absentia should be within one month after their date of death (if known). This is deduced from the Mursal Hadith stating that Muhammad performed a funeral prayer at the grave of a woman one month after her death, as Sayeed Ibn al-Musayyab reported: "Saad Bin Ubadh's mother died while the Prophet (peace and blessings of Allah be upon him) was absent. When he came to Madinah one month later, he offered the funeral prayer on her grave."

== Funeral prayer for the absentee ==
Muslim scholars have different opinions regarding the funeral prayer on the absentee.

This is the opinion of a great number of eminent Muslim scholars, including Al Khattaby and Al Rawiyani. Abu Dawud in his Sunan entitled a chapter: "Chapter of performing funeral prayer on a dead Muslim who died in a land of disbelief."

This opinion is also the belief of Ibn Taymiyah and his disciple Ibn AlQayyim. The latter said in Zad Al Mi'aad: "Sheikh Al Islam Ibn Taymiyah said: 'The right opinion is that the Muslim who died in a land where no funeral prayer was performed on him has the right to have absentee funeral prayer performed on him". This is similar to what Muhammad did when he heard about the death of Negus of Abyssinia, the proposed ruler (in Islamic tradition) who gave refuge to the Muslims when they fled Mecca. The absentee prayer fulfills the prayer obligation so that there is no need for other prayers.

=== The Shaafa'is and Hanbalis ===
The Shaafa'is and Hanbalis believe that the funeral prayer in absentia should be held for everyone who dies away from his hometown, even if the funeral prayer is offered for him in the place where he dies.

The second view is that it is prescribed to offer the funeral prayer in absentia if the deceased had benefited the Muslims in some way, such as a scholar, a mujahid or a rich man from whose wealth the people benefited, and so on.

The third view is that it is prescribed to offer the funeral prayer in absentia so long as the funeral prayer has not been offered for the deceased in the place where he died. If the funeral prayer has been offered for him, then it is not prescribed to offer the funeral prayer for him in absentia.

=== Al-Khurshi (Maaliki) ===
Al-Khurshi (Maaliki) said (2/142): The fact that the Prophet (peace and blessings of Allah be upon him) offered the funeral prayer for the Negus (in absentia) is one of the things that applied only to him.

Something similar was stated in Badaa'i al-Sanaa'i by al-Kasaani (Hanafi) (1/312).

Al-Nawawi said in al-Majmoo' (5/211): "Our view is that it is permissible to offer the funeral prayer for one died away from his home town, but Abu Haneefah disallowed it. Our evidence is the hadeeth about the Negus, which is saheeh and has no faults, and they do not have any valid answer to that."

Al-Shaafa'i imposed a valid restriction on offering the funeral prayer in absentia, which is that the one who offers the funeral prayer for the deceased should be one of those who would have offered the prayer for him the day he died.

== See also ==
- Islamic view of death
