= Shah Jahan Rural District =

Rural district in North Khorasan province, Iran

Shah Jahan Rural District Persian: دهستان شاه جهان
- Rural District
- Location within Iran
- Coordinates: 37°11′N 58°02′E
- Country: Iran
- Province: North Khorasan
- County: Faruj
- District: Central
- Established: 1987
- Capital: Maivan

Population (2016)
  - Total: 9,909
- Time zone: UTC+3:30 (IRST)

Shah Jahan Rural District (Persian: دهستان شاه جهان) is in the Central District of Faruj County, North Khorasan province, Iran. Its capital is the village of Maivan.

== Demographics ==
=== Population ===
At the time of the 2006 National Census, the rural district's population was 8,488 in 2,325 households. There were 9,744 inhabitants in 2,932 households at the following census of 2011. The 2016 census measured the population of the rural district as 9,909 in 3,105 households. The most populous of its 13 villages was Maivan, with 3,604 people.

=== Other villages in the rural district ===
- Bargard
- Chukanlu
- Hasht Markh
- Kalateh-ye Siah Dasht
- Kheyrabad
- Khosraviyeh
- Ostad
- Pir Ali
- Seh Gonbad
