= Destroying angel (Bible) =

Biblical figure sent to kill enemies of the Israelites

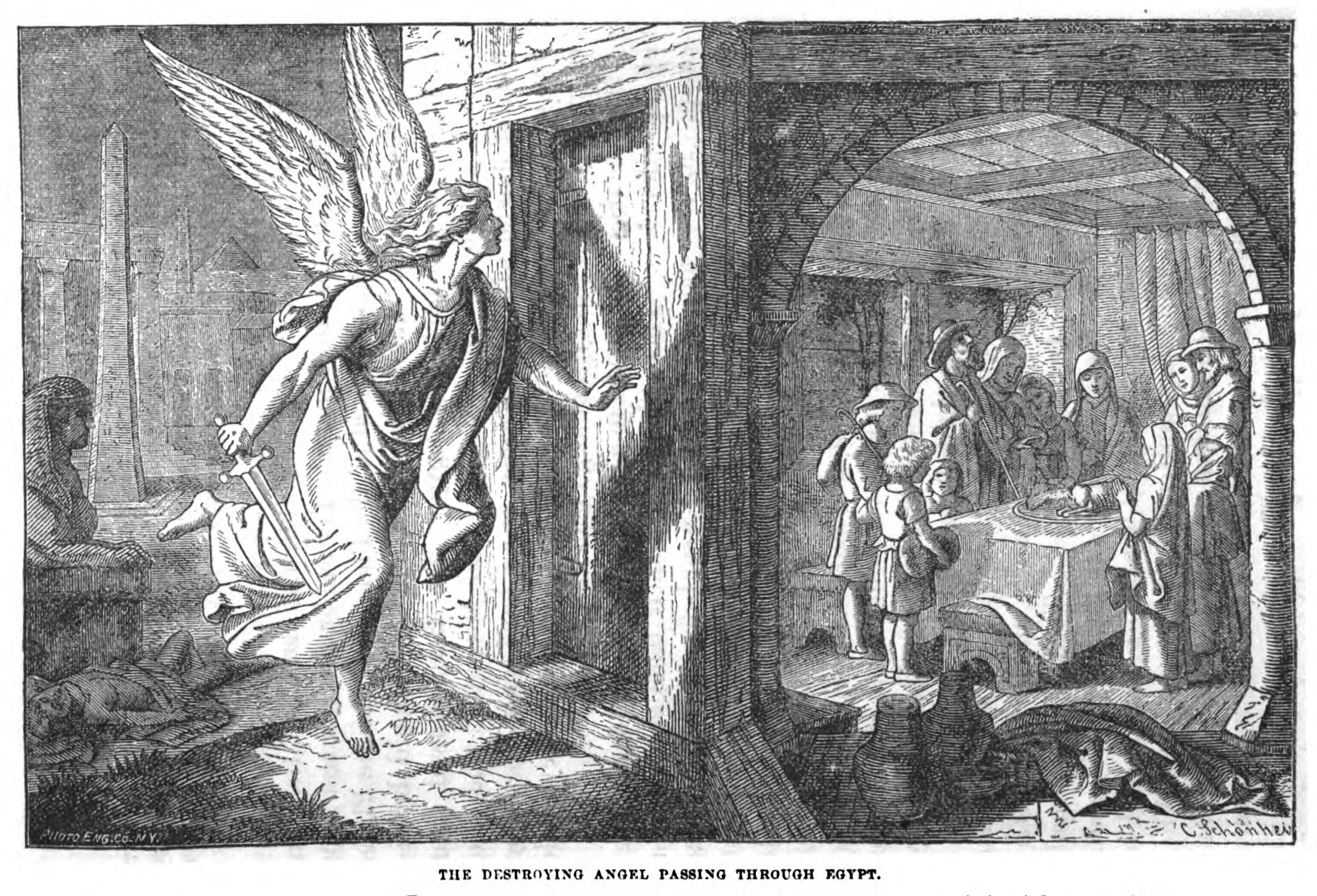
The destroying angel passes through Egypt.

In the Hebrew Bible, the destroying angel (Hebrew: מַלְאָך הַמַשְׁחִית, malʾāḵ hamašḥīṯ), also known as mashḥit (מַשְׁחִית mašḥīṯ, 'destroyer'; plural: מַשְׁחִיתִים, mašḥīṯīm, 'spoilers, ravagers'), is an entity sent out by God on several occasions to deal with numerous peoples.

These angels (mal’āḵīm) are also variously referred to as memitim (מְמִיתִים, 'executioners, slayers'), or, when used singularly, as the Angel of the Lord. The latter is found in Job 33:22, as well as in Proverbs 16:14 in the plural "messengers of death". Mashchith was also used as an alternate name for one of the seven compartments of Gehenna.

In 2 Samuel 24:15-16, the destroying angel almost destroyed Jerusalem but was recalled by God. In 1 Chronicles 21:15, the same "Angel of the Lord" is seen by David to stand "between the earth and the heaven, with a drawn sword in his hand stretched out against the Hebrews' enemies". Later, in 2 Kings 19:35, the angel kills 185,000 Assyrian soldiers.

In the Book of Enoch, angels of punishment and destruction belong to a group of angels called satans with Satan as their leader. First, they tempt, then accuse, and finally punish and torment both wicked humans and fallen angels.

In Judaism, such angels might be seen as created by one's sins. As long as a person lives, God allows them to repent. However, the angels of destruction can execute the sentence proclaimed in the heavenly court after death. Also called Malachei Habala ("Sabotage Angels"), they punish sinners in the underworld and are equated with Shedim (demons) (Berakhot 51a; Ketubot 104a; Sanhedrin 106b).

In Islam, according to a hadith a murderer is instructed to repent from their sins by leaving their evil environment and moving to a better one. However, they die on their way, thereupon a disagreement between the angels of mercy and the angels of punishment under the leadership of Iblīs (Satan) occurs, who may take the soul of the repenting murderer.

== See also ==
- Abaddon
- Azrael
- Punishment of the Grave
- Dumah (angel)
- Death (personification)
- List of angels in theology
- Mastema
- Mot
- Samael
- Zabaniyah
