= Bargard =

Village in North Khorasan province, Iran

Bargard Persian: برگرد
- Village
- Location within Iran
- Coordinates: 37°16′58″N 58°11′00″E
- Country: Iran
- Province: North Khorasan
- County: Faruj
- District: Central
- Rural District: Shah Jahan

Population (2016)
  - Total: 612
- Time zone: UTC+3:30 (IRST)

Bargard (Persian: برگرد) is a village in Shah Jahan Rural District of the Central District in Faruj County, North Khorasan province, Iran.

== Demographics ==
=== Population ===
At the time of the 2006 National Census, the village's population was 553 in 159 households. The following census in 2011 counted 549 people in 175 households. The 2016 census measured the population of the village as 612 people in 197 households.
