= Kalateh-ye Siah Dasht =

Village in North Khorasan province, Iran

Kalateh-ye Siah Dasht Persian: كلاته سياهدشت
- Village
- Location within Iran
- Coordinates: 37°14′49″N 58°07′57″E
- Country: Iran
- Province: North Khorasan
- County: Faruj
- District: Central
- Rural District: Shah Jahan

Population (2016)
  - Total: 664
- Time zone: UTC+3:30 (IRST)

Kalateh-ye Siah Dasht (Persian: كلاته سياهدشت) (Note: Also romanized as Kalāteh-ye Sīāh Dasht; also known as Sīāh Dasht and Stah Dasht) is a village in Shah Jahan Rural District of the Central District in Faruj County, North Khorasan province, Iran.

== Demographics ==
=== Population ===
At the time of the 2006 National Census, the village's population was 626 in 170 households. The following census in 2011 counted 591 people in 181 households. The 2016 census measured the population of the village as 664 people in 209 households.
