= Kheyrabad, Faruj =

Village in North Khorasan province, Iran

Kheyrabad Persian: خيراباد
- Village
- Location within Iran
- Coordinates: 37°13′44″N 58°03′41″E
- Country: Iran
- Province: North Khorasan
- County: Faruj
- District: Central
- Rural District: Shah Jahan

Population (2016)
  - Total: 633
- Time zone: UTC+3:30 (IRST)

Kheyrabad (Persian: خيراباد) (Note: Also romanized as Kheyrābād) is a village in Shah Jahan Rural District of the Central District in Faruj County, North Khorasan province, Iran.

== Demographics ==
=== Population ===
At the time of the 2006 National Census, the village's population was 524 in 147 households. The following census in 2011 counted 597 people in 175 households. The 2016 census measured the population of the village as 633 people in 201 households.
