= Ostad, North Khorasan =

Village in North Khorasan province, Iran

Ostad Persian: استاد
- Village
- Location within Iran
- Coordinates: 37°10′14″N 58°00′15″E
- Country: Iran
- Province: North Khorasan
- County: Faruj
- District: Central
- Rural District: Shah Jahan

Population (2016)
  - Total: 398
- Time zone: UTC+3:30 (IRST)

Ostad (Persian: استاد) (Note: Also romanized as Ostād; also known as Āstī Kharvah) is a village in Shah Jahan Rural District of the Central District in Faruj County, North Khorasan province, Iran.

== Demographics ==
=== Population ===
At the time of the 2006 National Census, the village's population was 435 in 133 households. The following census in 2011 counted 572 people in 201 households. The 2016 census measured the population of the village as 398 people in 155 households.
