= Pir Ali, North Khorasan =

Village in North Khorasan province, Iran

Pir Ali Persian: پيرعلي
- Village
- Location within Iran
- Coordinates: 37°11′37″N 58°04′32″E
- Country: Iran
- Province: North Khorasan
- County: Faruj
- District: Central
- Rural District: Shah Jahan

Population (2016)
  - Total: 285
- Time zone: UTC+3:30 (IRST)

Pir Ali (Persian: پيرعلي) (Note: Also romanized as Pīr ‘Alī) is a village in Shah Jahan Rural District of the Central District in Faruj County, North Khorasan province, Iran.

== Demographics ==
=== Population ===
At the time of the 2006 National Census, the village's population was 246 in 57 households. The following census in 2011 counted 232 people in 56 households. The 2016 census measured the population of the village as 285 people in 75 households.
