= Maivan =

Village in North Khorasan province, Iran

Maivan Persian: مايوان
- Village
- Location within Iran
- Coordinates: 37°13′06″N 58°02′04″E
- Country: Iran
- Province: North Khorasan
- County: Faruj
- District: Central
- Rural District: Shah Jahan

Population (2016)
  - Total: 3,604
- Time zone: UTC+3:30 (IRST)

Maivan (Persian: مايوان) (Note: Also romanized as Māīvān, Mayvan, and Māyvān) is a village in, and the capital of, Shah Jahan Rural District in the Central District of Faruj County, North Khorasan province, Iran.

== Demographics ==
=== Population ===
At the time of the 2006 National Census, the village's population was 2,629 in 750 households. The following census in 2011 counted 3,326 people in 981 households. The 2016 census measured the population of the village as 3,604 people in 1,130 households, the most populous in its rural district.
