= Maalik =

In Islam, an angel of hell (Jahannam)

In Islamic belief, Maalik or Mâlik (Arabic: مٰلِكُ, romanized: mālik) (Note: Different pronunciation with Malik from the Names of God in Islam.) is the chief angel and gate keeper of Jahannam (hellfire) assisted by other angels called Zabaniyah. In the Qur'an, he is mentioned in Az-Zukhruf as the chief guard of the angels of hell. The earliest codices offer various alternative spellings of this word including malak (ملاك), meaning "angel", instead of a proper name.

== Etymology ==
The native authorities derived the name from mlk, meaning "to possess, rule over".

== In Qur'an ==
In 43:77 and the following, the Qur'an describes Maalik telling the people in hell that they must remain there:

Indeed, the wicked will be in the torment of Hell forever. It will never be lightened for them, and there they will be overwhelmed with despair. We did not wrong them, but it was they who were the wrongdoers. They will cry, "O Mâlik! Let your Lord finish us off." He will answer, "You are definitely here to stay." We certainly brought the truth to you, but most of you were resentful of the truth.

— Surah Az-Zukhruf 43:74-78

Surah At-Tahrim 66:6 points out, that the punishments are carried out by God's command: "O believers! Protect yourselves and your families from a Fire whose fuel is people and stones, overseen by formidable and severe angels, who never disobey whatever Allah orders—always doing as commanded."

== In Hadith ==
According to Islamic tradition, Muhammad met the angel Maalik during his heavenly journey. Therefore, Muhammad arrived in heaven and all the angels greeted him with a smile except Maalik. When Muhammad asked Jibra'il, why he remains taciturn therefore, he reveals Maalik as the guardian of Hell who never smiles. After that, Muhammad asked him to show Hell and Maalik opened its gates, showing him a glimpse of suffering for the inmates.

In Sahih al-Bukhari, there is a report from Samura ibn Jundab in which the Islamic prophet reiterates the role of Maalik as "the one who kindles the fire" and "the gate-keeper of the hellfire".

According to Abbasid jurist Ibn Qutaybah, who's also known as Al-Qutb, the number of fingers Maalik possessed are equal to the sinners who would be thrown into hell. Ibn Qutaybah also narrated that each of Maalik's fingers are extremely hot, that if one of them touched the sky; that finger will cause the sky to melt. al-Suyuti also quoted that since his creation which spans a thousand years before hell's formation, Maalik's strength always grow infinitely over the time as each day passed. Ibn Hisham narrated that in several Hadiths, Muhammad has met Maalik on one occasion and described that the angel possessed a very disgustingly ugly face. In one narration of Hadith, Maalik's true face is so ugly beyond comprehension, that if any human in their lifetime saw him, they would be killed in suffering and anguish just by merely bearing witness of Maalik's ugliness.

Medieval Hagiographer Ibn Ishaq has narrated hadith about Isra Mi'raj, where during his journey to the sky, Muhammad noticed that among the angels who greeted him, Maalik was one of them, who, unlike the other angels, never showed a smile or any sign of joy. According to various Hadiths quoted by Ibn Hisham in his book, Muhammad asked Jibril to see hell, which Jibril responded by asking Maalik to show Muhammad the view of the horrors of hell.

== See also ==
- List of angels in theology
- Zabaniyah
- Ridwan
- Yama
