= Hasht Markh =

Village in North Khorasan province, Iran

Hasht Markh Persian: هشت مرخ
- Village
- Location within Iran
- Coordinates: 37°05′03″N 57°58′44″E
- Country: Iran
- Province: North Khorasan
- County: Faruj
- District: Central
- Rural District: Shah Jahan

Population (2016)
  - Total: 44
- Time zone: UTC+3:30 (IRST)

Hasht Markh (Persian: هشت مرخ) (Note: Also known as Hasht Margh) is a village in Shah Jahan Rural District of the Central District in Faruj County, North Khorasan province, Iran.

== Demographics ==
=== Population ===
At the time of the 2006 National Census, the village's population was 17 in seven households. The following census in 2011 counted 31 people in 11 households. The 2016 census measured the population of the village as 44 people in 19 households.
