= Chukanlu, Faruj =

Village in North Khorasan province, Iran

Chukanlu Persian: چوكانلو
- Village
- Location within Iran
- Coordinates: 37°12′20″N 58°01′12″E
- Country: Iran
- Province: North Khorasan
- County: Faruj
- District: Central
- Rural District: Shah Jahan

Population (2016)
  - Total: 1,730
- Time zone: UTC+3:30 (IRST)

Chukanlu (Persian: چوكانلو) (Note: Also romanized as Chūkānlū) is a village in Shah Jahan Rural District of the Central District in Faruj County, North Khorasan province, Iran.

== Demographics ==
=== Population ===
At the time of the 2006 National Census, the village's population was 1,683 in 405 households. The following census in 2011 counted 1,787 people in 497 households. The 2016 census measured the population of the village as 1,730 people in 506 households.
