= Chukanlu, Shirvan =

Chukanlu چوكانلو
- Village
- Location within Iran
- Coordinates: 37°33′33″N 57°44′04″E
- Country: Iran
- Province: North Khorasan
- County: Shirvan
- Bakhsh: Sarhad
- Rural District: Takmaran

Population (2006)
  - Total: 283
- Time zone: UTC+3:30 (IRST)
  - Summer (DST): UTC+4:30 (IRDT)

Chukanlu (Persian: چوكانلو, also Romanized as Chūkānlū and Chowkanloo) is a village in Takmaran Rural District, Sarhad District, Shirvan County, North Khorasan Province, Iran. At the 2006 census, its population was 283, in 67 families.
