= Sijjin =

Underworld Prison in Islam

Sijjīn (Arabic: سِجِّين lit. Netherworld, Underworld, Chthonian World) is, in Islamic belief, either a prison, vehement torment or straitened circumstances at the bottom of Jahannam or hell, below the earth (compare Greek Tartarus), which is mentioned in Quran 83:7. Sijjin is also considered to be a place for the souls of disbelievers until resurrection.

The idea that there is a hell underneath Earth's surface roots in the Quran, which speaks about "seven earths" (65:12), while describing hell as a subterranean pit, divided into seven compartments.(15:44) Thus, many Muslim authors coincided hell with layers of the Earth with sijjin at the bottom. For the lowest layer of hell, the term al-asfal is used too. The antithesis of Sijjin is Illiyin.

== Etymology ==
The word as an adjective means "vehement" or "intense" and is derived from the root S-J-N (س ج ن) related to gaoling or imprisonment. The Arabic word for prison sijn (Arabic: سِجْن), along with verbs from the root, appears several times in Surah Yūsuf in relation to the account of Joseph in prison.

A similar-sounding word (but of unrelated etymology from Byzantine Greek σιγίλλιον sigíllion via Classical Syriac), sijill (Arabic: سِّجِلّ) appears in a verse (21:104) and is translated as "scroll". Some exegetes who interpret the word sijjīn as a register for the damned or a book listing the names of the sinful draw a connection between the two words.

== Interpretations ==
=== Sunni Islam ===
Al-Tabari reports essentially two different opinions regarding the meaning of Sijjin in his Tafsir:

- It is a book containing the evil deeds of the sinners: "their works are in a book in the lowest earth."
- A prison for the damned: "it is the seventh lowest earth, in which Satan (Iblis) is chained, and in it are the souls (arwah) of the infidels (kufar).

The idea that Sijjin is the place after Iblis was cast out from heaven, is also held by other Sunni scholars, such as Abu Ishaq al-Tha'labi and Nasafi.

=== Shia tradition ===
According to some Shia traditions, the enemies of Ahl al-Bayt are created from the earth of Sijjin.

=== Sufi cosmology ===
According to Annemarie Schimmel, traditional Sufi leaders linked the seven gates of hell each to a specific sin. This image of an ethical hell often associates each sin with a specific body part. Al-Futuhat al-Makkiyya, written between 1203 and 1240 by Ibn Arabi, visualises this idea, correlating each layer of hell to one specific body part, sijjin being the gravest: jahannam – feet, al-jahim – genitals, al-sa'ir – belly, saqar – hands, laza – tongue, al-hutama – ears, sijjin – eyes.

According to al-Ghazali otherworld (akhira) is a dream like realm unfolding its existence postmortem. In his work The Incoherence of the Philosophers, he explains that this doesn't lower the deceased experience of the afterlife, but they perceive pleasure and pain like when they were alive. According to The Alchemy of Happiness, sijjin will be a manifestation of the earthly life, presented to those who pursued worldy matters instead of religious bliss. The earthly world turns out to be a prison, and their bodily desires manifest as chains binding them to the earthly world, which turns out to be a prison (sijjin), surrounded by tempations they gave in, embodied by devils (shayāṭīn).

== In popular culture ==
The Turkish horror film series Siccîn is named after this Islamic term.

== See also ==
- Underworld
- Spirits in prison
- Tartarus
- Hell
