= Azrael =

Archangel of Death in Islam

עֲזַרְאֵל عزرائيل
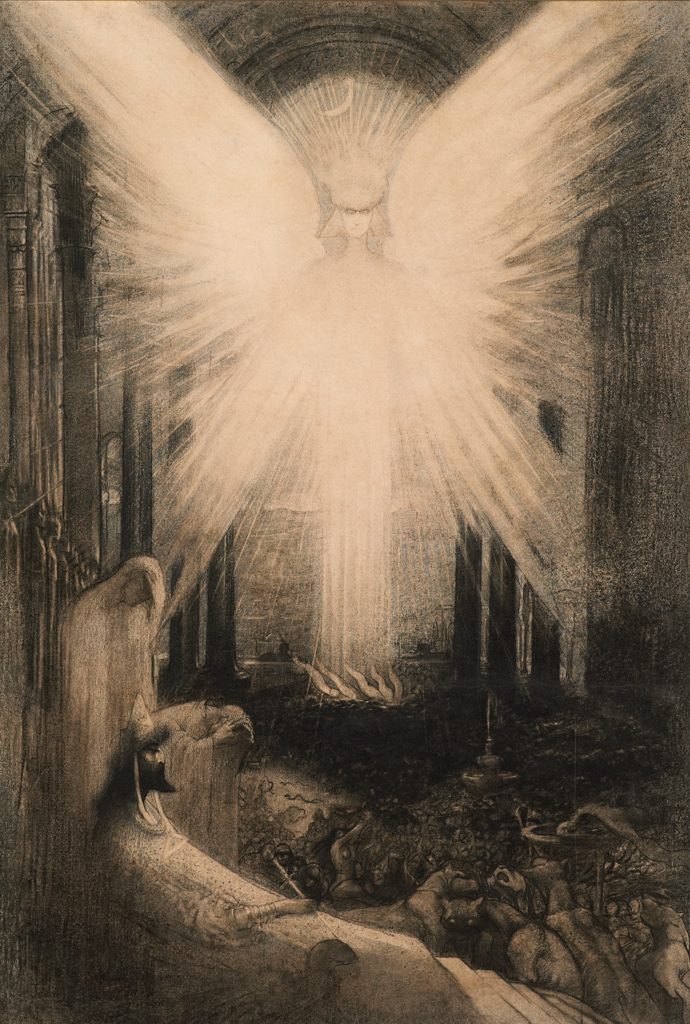
- According to Brendan Cole, this painting of Azrael is linked to a 1892 poem by Delville called "Azraël" (published in his book Les Horizons Hantés)

Angel of Death
- Associated religions: Islam
- Attributes: Archangel; psychopomp; wings; cloak.
- Associations: Jibrāʾīl, Mīkāʾīl, and Isrāfīl (in Islam)
- Alternate spellings: ʿĂzarʾēl; ʿAzrāʾīl; ʿIzrāʾīl; Ajrā-īl; Ezrā’ël
- Appearance in text: Quran (Surah As-Sajdah); Apocalypse of Peter

Azrael (/ˈæzri.əl, ˈæzreɪəl/; Hebrew: עֲזַרְאֵל, romanized: ʿǍzarʾēl, lit. 'God has helped'; Arabic: عزرائيل, romanized: ʿAzrāʾīl or ʿIzrāʾīl) is the canonical angel of death in Islam. An Angel with a similar name appears in the 16th century Classical Ethiopic version of Apocalypse of Peter, but as an angel of hell who avenges those who had been wronged during life.

Relative to similar concepts of such beings, Azrael holds a benevolent role as God's angel of death; he acts as a psychopomp, responsible for transporting the souls of the deceased after their death. In Islam, he is said to hold a scroll concerning the fate of mortals, recording and erasing their names at their birth and death, similar to the role of the malakh ha-mavet (Angel of Death) in Judaism.

Depending on the perspective and precepts of the various religions in which he is a figure, he may also be portrayed as a resident of the Third Heaven, a division of heaven in Judaism and Islam. In Islam, he is one of the four archangels, and is identified with the Quranic Malak al-Mawt (ملك الموت, 'Angel of Death'), which corresponds with the Hebrew term Malʾakh ha-Maweth (מלאך המוות) in Rabbinic literature. In Hebrew, Azrael translates to 'Angel of God' or 'Help from God'.

== Etymology and place in Judaism ==
The Hebrew Bible does not mention an angel by the name Azrael, nor does it appear in the rabbinic literature of the Talmud or Midrashim. No such angel is treated as canonical in traditional Rabbinic Judaism. However, an angel by a similar name, Azriel (עזריאל), is mentioned in Kabbalistic literature such as the Zohar.

Despite the absence of such a figure in Judaism, the name Azrael is suggestive of a Hebrew theophoric עזראל, meaning "the one whom God helps". Archeological evidence uncovered in Jewish settlements in Mesopotamia confirms that it was indeed at one time used on an incantation bowl from the 7th century. However, as the text thereon only lists names, an association of this angelic name with death cannot be identified in Judaism.

After the emergence of Islam, the name Ezrā’ël became popular among both Christian and Islamic literature and folklore. The name spelled as Ezrā’ël appears in the Classical Ethiopic version of Apocalypse of Peter (dating to the 16th century) as an angel of hell who avenges those who had been wronged during life.

== Islam ==
Before the creation of man, only Azrael succeeded in taking dust from Earth in order to bring God the materials needed to make man. For this success he was made the angel of death and given a register of all mankind. Along with Gabriel, Michael, and Israfil, Azrael is one of the four major archangels in Islam. He is responsible for taking the souls of the deceased away from the body. Azrael does not act independently, but is only informed by God when the time is up to take a soul.

=== In Quran and its exegesis ===
Surah 32:11 mentions the angel of death identified with Azrael. Surah 6:61 mentions a multitude of angels of death interpreted as assistants of Azrael. When the unbelievers in hell cry out for help, an angel, also identified with Azrael, will appear on the horizon and tell them that they have to remain.

The eighth Umayyad Caliph Umar ibn Abd al-Aziz once reported the commentary regarding Azrael in Quran chapter As-Sajdah verse 11 Quran 32:11, that taking many lives is very easy for the angel, that in caliph's words "it is as if the entire mankind of earth were only like a dish on a plate from the perspective of Malak al-Mawt (angel of death)".

=== In hadiths ===
According to one Muslim tradition, 40 days before the death of a person approaches, God drops a leaf from a tree below the heavenly throne, on which Azrael reads the name of the person he must take with him. Al-Qurtubi narrated commentary from classical scholar, Ibn Zhafar al-Wa'izh, that Azrael, has a shape resembling a blue colored ram, has numerous eyes in numerous places, and according to Ikrimah Mawlâ Ibn 'Abbâs, a tabiʾ scholar, (Note: According to the narrator, Ikrimah, he saw this narration from non-canonical source which he named the "scroll of Seth".) the size of Azrael were so huge that "if the Earth were put on his shoulder, it would be like a bean in an open field". He also had 4,000 wings which consisted of two types, wings of grace and wings of punishment. The wings of punishment are made from iron rods, hooks, and scissors. Muqatil ibn Sulayman has recorded his commentary in his commentary work, al-Suluk, the angel possessed 70,000 limbs of foot. (Note: Muqatil ibn Sulayman were neglected by numbers of Islamic scholars, such as Abu Hanifa (d. 150 H/ 767 CE) who criticised his theology, Ibn al-Mubarak (d. 181 H/ 797 CE) who criticised his methodology (particularly that he did not quote Hadith with chains of transmission), and Wakee ibn al-Jarrah (d. 197/ 812 CE) who criticize Muqatil as lying in his narration. Ibn Hajar in particular quotes the following from him: "Two disgusting opinions came to us from the east: Jahm the negator [of God’s attributes] and Muqatil the anthropomorphist." Ibn Rajab al-Hanbali stated that the early scholars (as-salaf) rejected Muqatil's views after they became known after his debate with Jahm. However, more recent scholars has argued while Muqatil are not trustworthy, his theology as antrophomorphist are falsely attributed, as Ibn Abi al-Izz (d. 731), a follower of Ibn Taymiyyah, argued that al-Ash'ari's material originated from the Mu'tazila and/or must have been tampered with. Contemporary Saudi scholar Abdullah al-Ghunayman, author of the commentary on Ibn Taymiyyah's Al-Aqidah Al-Waasitiyyah, argues that he could not find anything he would consider anthropomorphic from Muqatil, arguing that to be reliable, ones views must be taken from one's own works, and not from the works of an opponent. Al-Ghunayman says "Mushabbih" has become a catch word to accuse one's opponents because of their different views.)

Umar ibn Abd al-Aziz, an Umayyad caliph, reported a narration that the angel of death is armed with a flaming whip. Caliph Umar also reported a narration that the angel of death was so huge that he dwarfed Bearers of the Throne, group of angels which are known as the biggest among angels.

The "Islamic Book of Dead" describes him with 4 faces, and his whole body consists of eyes and tongues whose number corresponds to the number of humans inhabiting the Earth.

The angel of death features in a famous extra-Quranic creation story regarding the creation of Adam, recorded by various Muslim scholars, including Tabari, Mas'udi, Maqdisi, Kisa'i, Tha'labi, Ibn Kathir in his work Qiṣaṣ al-Anbiyā (Stories of the Prophets), and Muqatil. Accordingly, God ordered the archangels to collect dust from earth from which Adam is supposed to be created. Only Azrael succeeded, whereupon he was destined to become the angel concerning life and death, a reference to show the close connection between these two.

=== Relationship between Azrael and death ===
Islam ^{[Who?]} elaborated further narratives concerning the relation between Azrael and Death. Christian Lange mentioned that according to some scholars Azrael and Death were one entity; other exegesis scholars opined Azrael and Death were different entities, with Death as some kind of tool used by Azrael to take life.

One account explains death and its relation to Azrael, representing Death and Azrael as former two separate entities, but when God created Death, God ordered the angels to look upon it and they swoon for a thousand years. After the angels regained consciousness, Death recognized that it must submit to Azrael. This opinion were shared among scholars of Islam such as Sultan ibn ‘Abdirrahman Al-‘Umairi, in his book Al-‘Uquud Adz-Dzahabiyyah ‘alaa Maqaasid Al-‘Aqiidah Al-Waasithiyyah where he adds commentary the Hadith about Death will be materialized after the judgment day in form of a Ram, which said as different entity than Angel Azrael. According to one narration, Azrael is rewarded to become the angel of death for successfully carrying the dirt of the earth from which Adam would be created.

The identification of "Death" and angel Azrael as one entity were explained in a Hadith about the fate of "Death" entity itself after the judgment day, where classical Hanafite scholar Badr al-Din al-Ayni has interpreted in that Hadith which compiled in Sahih Bukhari collection, that Death would take on the form of a ram, then placed between paradise and hell, and finally slaughtered by God himself, causing Death cease to exist, which followed by God to declare to both people of paradise and hell that eternity has begun, and their state will never end. Lange mentioned that according to some scholars, the ram in that Hadith narration is no other than the angel of death himself, while others assert, this to be death's own form in the hereafter. In other account sourced from Muqatil ibn Sulayman, Azrael and death were said as one entity as he reported the angel has number of faces and hands equal to the number of living creatures on his body, where each of those faces and hands are connected with the life of each souls in the living world. Whenever a face within Azrael body vanished, then the soul which connected with it will experience death.

=== Saints and prophets ===
A common belief holds that the lesser angels of death are for the common people, while saints and prophets meet the archangel of death himself. According to this islamic belief prophets, such as Moses and Muhammad are invited politely by him, but saints are also said to meet Azrael in beautiful forms.

It is said that, when Rumi was about to die, he laid in his bed and met Azrael in human shape. The belief that Azrael appears to saints before they actually die to prepare themselves for death, is also attested by the testament of Nasir Khusraw, in which he claims to have met Azrael during his sleep, informing him about his upcoming death. According to the Sufi teacher Al-Jili, Azrael appears to the soul in a form provided by its most powerful metaphors.

== Western reception ==
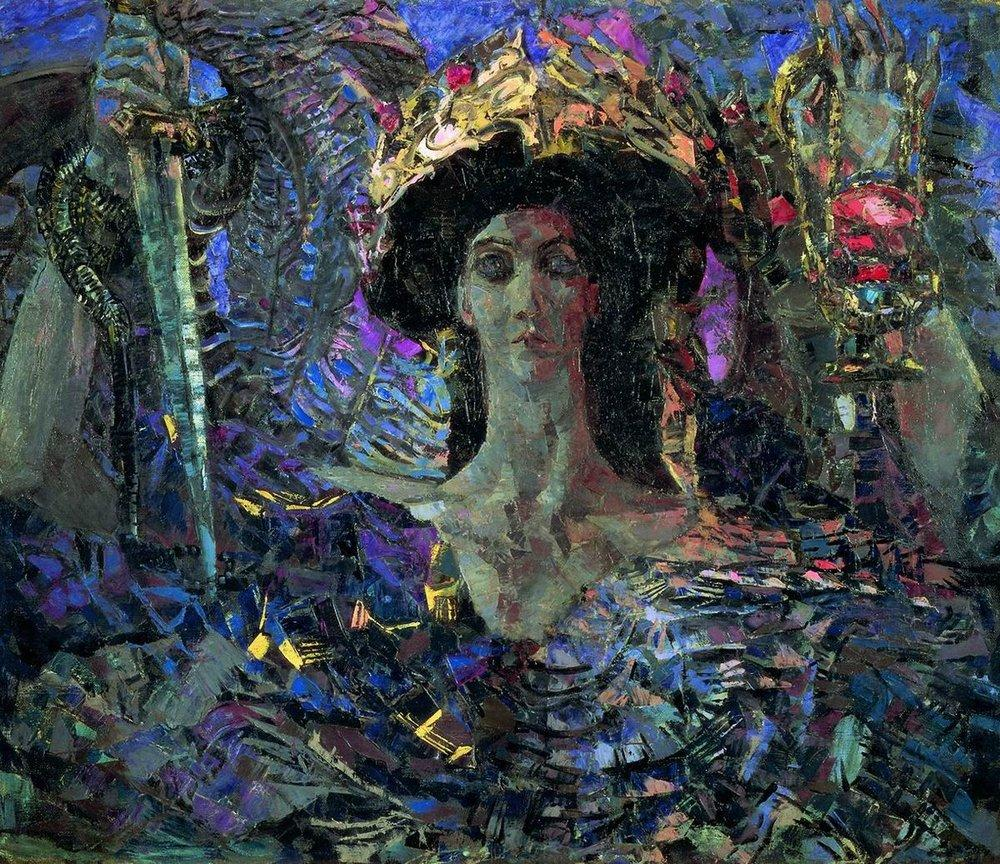
A Six-Winged Seraph (Azrael) by Mikhail Vrubel, 1904

The Islamic notion of Azrael, including some narratives such as the tale of Solomon (a hadith reaching back to Shahr Ibn Hawshab,) was already known in the United States in the 18th century - as attested by Gregory Sharpe and James Harris.

Some Western adaptations extended the physical description of Azrael, hence the English poet Leigh Hunt depicted Azrael in 1850 as wearing a black-hooded cloak. Although omitting the traditional scythe, Hunt's portrayal nevertheless resembles the Grim Reaper. Henry Wadsworth Longfellow mentions Azrael in "The Reaper and the Flowers" as an angel of death, but he is not equated with Samael, the angel of death in Jewish lore who appears as a fallen and malevolent angel, instead. Azrael also appears in G. K. Chesterton's poem "Lepanto" (published in 1915) as one of the Islamic spirits commanded by "Mahound" (Muhammad) to resist Don John of Austria's crusade. In The Smurfs, the cat of the evil wizard Gargamel is called Azrael. A character of the same name was portrayed by Jason Lee in the Kevin Smith fantasy-comedy film Dogma. In Stephen King's novel, as well as the movie adaptation of Doctor Sleep, the cat that lives in the hospice care facility and senses a patient's impending death is named Azrael, nicknamed Azzie for short.

Philip Pullman uses a variant spelling of the name "Azrael" in the name of Lord Asriel in the His Dark Materials trilogy (1995-2000).

Terry Pratchett’s 1991 Discworld novel Reaper Man depicts Azrael as the universal destroyer, of which the Death of Discworld is only one tiny aspect.

In Joy Williams's 2024 novel Concerning the Future of Souls, Azrael is a core character, although his responsibilities extend beyond serving as a psychopomp for humanity alone—he also collects the souls of other sentient beings on Earth, such as whales and apes. Williams' book includes ninety-nine story accounts of his duties and interactions with multiple souls, God, Satan and countless others.

== See also ==
- Angels in Islam – Heavenly beings found in the Islamic tradition
- Azriel (disambiguation)
- Baron Samedi – Loa of Haitian Vodou, Louisiana Voodoo and folk beliefs, personification of Death
- Charon – Ferryman of Hades in Greek mythology
- Death (personification) – Anthropomorphized depiction of life's end
- Destroying angel (Bible) – Biblical figure sent to kill enemies of the Israelites
- Dumah (angel) – Angel in Rabbinic and Islamic literature
- List of angels in theology
- Punishment of the Grave – Islamic–Jewish religious concept
- Saureil – Angel of death in Mandaeism
- Santa Muerte – Mexican new religious movement, female deity, and folk saint
- Thanatos – Ancient Greek personification of death
