= Akhirah =

Afterlife and resurrection in Islam

Al-Ākhirah (Arabic: الآخرة, derived from Akhir which means last, ultimate, end or close) is an Arabic term for "the Hereafter".

In Islamic eschatology, on Judgment Day, the natural or temporal world (dunya) will come to an end, the dead will be resurrected from their graves, and God will pronounce judgment on their deeds, consigning them for eternity to either the bliss of Jannah (heaven) or the torment of Jahannam (hell).

The belief that death is not the end of existence, but a transferral from the temporal world to the everlasting world, (al-Ākhirah), is a belief Islam shares with other Abrahamic religions such as Judaism and Christianity.

Al-Ākhirah is referenced dozens of times in the Quran in numerous surahs where among other things, believers are told it makes "the enjoyment of this worldly life" (dunya) appear "insignificant" (Q.9:38).

In connection with the Last Judgment, it is traditionally considered to be one of the six essential beliefs of Muslims, along with Tawhid (monotheism), angels, the four Revealed Books: the Injeel (Gospel), Tawrat (Torah), Quran, and the Zabur (Psalms), and prophets and messengers, and predestination. In Islamic doctrine, al-Akhirah is necessary because the pious often suffer and unbelievers often prosper and enjoy themselves in the temporal world. To rectify that and to bring justice, al-Akhirah with rewards of Jannah and punishment of Jahannam is necessary.

== Importance ==
In the Quran, dunya is contrasted with akhira as "now" versus "later" and also as something negative versus something positive.

The Quran acknowledges the "necessity" of dunya for "carrying out the divine will", where duties should not be neglected, saying:

"Ordain for us the good in this world [al-dunya] and in the hereafter [al-akhira]" (Q.7:156); and Muslim intellectuals (such as Muhammad Darwazah) have emphasized the importance of dunya in Islam: 'Islam is a religion of the world (din al-dunya), of government, society, moral order, to the same extent as it is a religion of faith and belief and the next world (din al-akhirah).'"

But the "usual contrast" between the two realms is as "two clear moral alternatives" that the individual has to choose between as "the focal point of his or her attention and activity":

"Whosoever desires the harvest of the akhira, We will increase for him this harvest. And whoever desires the harvest of the dunya, We will give it to him, but he will have no share in the hereafter" (Q.42:20); "Life in the dunya is nothing but a distraction and a sport, but in the dār al-akhira is life, if only they knew" (Q.29:64).

On the other hand, some Muslim mystics assert the two realms are "in a constant state of interpenetration", (according to one Todd Lawson), as expressed in the hadith: “the Garden is closer to you than the strap of your sandal and so is the Fire”.

== Pre-dunya ==
The Quran makes "no mention of the pre-existence" of human souls before birth aside from "the rather ambiguous reference" in one verse:

"When your Lord took from Banī Ādam [the human race] their progeny from their loins and made them testify concerning themselves, 'Am I not your Lord?' They replied, 'Yes! we do testify. That you may not say on the day of resurrection, truly we were ignorant of this.' (Q.7:172)

This verse was traditionally interpreted to "affirm the idea of pre-existence", though in modern times it is thought to refer to humanity's responsibility to "the primordial covenant" man made with God.

== Barzakh ==
In Islam, Barzakh is a state that is neither part of the temporal world of dunya, nor the hereafter. It lies between them (Barzakh meaning "separation" or "barrier"). Specifically in Islam it refers to phase/stage after a person dies and before they are resurrected for Judgement Day. This is based on the verse: " [...] behind them is a barrier until the Day they are resurrected." Al Quran [23:100]

During this time many if not all Muslims believe the dead person will be given a taste of either the rewards or the punishments they will live with after Judgement Day.

Some scholars give a different definition of Barzakh: According to Ghazali, Barzakh may also be the place for those, who go neither to hell nor to heaven. According to Ibn Hazm, Barzakh is also the place for the unborn souls, existing in the lowest heaven, where an angel blows the soul into wombs.

== End of the world ==
Muslims believe that preceding this Day will be "signs" or portents of the Hour or the signs of the Day of Resurrection, and they are divided into minor signs and major signs. (Note: from translation of the corresponding article in Arabic)

A number of verses of the Quran mention great destruction, believed to refer to the destruction of the material world:

"And when the trumpet is blown with a single blast, and the earth and the mountains are removed from their places, and crushed with a single crushing, then on that Day shall the (Great) Event befall" (Quran 69:13–15).

" [...] on the day the earth and mountains will shake violently and mountains will be reduced to dunes of shifting sand." (Quran 73:14)

"Assuredly what ye are promised must come to pass. Then when the stars become dim; When the heavens is cleft asunder; When the mountains are scattered (to the winds) as dust". (Quran 77:7–10)

"When the Event inevitable cometh to pass, Then will no (soul) deny its coming. (Many) will it bring low; (many) will it exalt; When the earth shall be shaken to its depths, And the mountains shall be crumbled to atoms, Becoming dust scattered abroad, and the mountains will be crushed to pieces". (Quran 56:1–5)

"The Day that the sky will be like molten brass and the mountains will be like wool." (Quran 70:8-9)

=== Time ===
The exact time when these events will occur is unknown, however there are said to be major and minor signs which are to occur near the time of Qiyammah (end times), with one significant event being when Jesus and Imam Mahdi battle the Dajjal.

== Judgement Day ==
Yawm ad-Din (yawm: 'day', din: 'judgement') is the Day of Judgement, when it is said Allah will decide how people will spend their afterlife. Most Muslims believe they have free will to make their own choices. They also believe that they will be judged by God for those choices.

The judgment doesn't depend upon the amount of deeds, deeds are judged on the basis of the will behind it (intentional deeds).

=== People on the Day of Resurrection ===
With regard to the resurrection, people are of three types:

1. A section of pious believers will to go to Paradise,
2. Infidels will go to hell and before Judgment day they will be tormented in their graves.
3. "The people of disobedience", i.e. disobedient Muslims who have committed sins, may be tortured according to their crimes, to be "purified from their evil". This may happen after they die but before resurrection, or after Resurrection when they are sent to Hellfire. After their torture purification they may go to Jannah either by being pardoned by God or saved "through intercessors from angels, prophets, and so on". (Note: from translation of the corresponding article in Arabic)

== Afterlife events ==
There are numerous mentions in the Quran of the sounding of a trumpet sounding in connection with some dramatic event, including:

"The Trumpet will be blown and all those in the heavens and all those on the earth will fall dead, except those Allah wills ˹to spare˺. Then it will be blown again and they will rise up at once, looking on ˹in anticipation˺." (Q.39:68)

And numerous mentions of destruction of the world:

"And when the trumpet is blown with a single blast, and the earth and the mountains are removed from their places, and crushed with a single crushing, then on that Day shall the (Great) Event befall" (Q.69:13–15);

=== Heaven and hell ===
Heaven and hell consist of different realms. The status of each person depends on the amount of his good deeds if he is in Paradise, and the amount of his bad deeds if he is in hell. God may forgive the sins of a person towards him, but He does not forgive the sins of a person towards another. And each is graded according to what that person did, and your Lord is not unaware of what they do. (Note: from translation of the corresponding article in Arabic)

Muadh bin Jabal, narrated on the authority of the prophet Muhammad, that he said: "Leave the people to work, for Paradise is one hundred degrees, between each two levels is as between heaven and earth. If you ask God, ask Him for Paradise." (Note: from translation of the corresponding article in Arabic) Jannah and Jahannam both have various levels. The placement of a person may depend upon the extent of his or her good will behind the deeds. It is also said that God may forgive a sin against Himself but not against another. In mainstream Islam, the sufferings and pleasure of Jannah and Jahannam are thought to be both spiritual and corporeal. There is physical suffering from fire (and many other things), but the damned also experience fire "in their hearts". Similarly, those in Jannah will experience gardens, houris, wine that does not make them drunk, but their greatest happiness will be divine pleasure.

== See also ==
- Glossary of Islam
- Outline of Islam
- Islamic eschatology
