= Dumah (angel) =

Angel in Rabbinic and Islamic literature

Dumah (Heb. דּוּמָה dūmā, "silence") is an angel mentioned in Rabbinic and Islamic literature as an angel who has authority over the wicked dead. Dumah is a popular figure in Yiddish folklore. I. B. Singer's Short Friday (1964), a collection of stories, mentions Dumah as a "thousand-eyed angel of death armed with a fiery rod or flaming sword". Dumah is the Aramaic word for "silence".

== The angel ==
Duma(h) or Douma (Aramaic) is the angel of silence and the stillness of death.

Dumah is also the prince of Hell, and angel of vindication. The Zohar speaks of him as having "tens of thousands of angels of destruction" under him and as being "Chief of demons in Gehinnom [i.e., Hell] with 12,000 myriads of attendants, all charged with the punishment of the souls of sinners." and three angels of destruction are appointed to him. He and his fellow angels torment the sinners every day of the week except on Shabbat.

According to hadiths mentioned in Al-Suyuti's al-Haba'ik fi akhbar al-mala'ik, Azrael hands over the souls of the deceased unbelievers to Dumah.

== Other references ==
- Dumah is a city associated with the descendants of Ishmael that was known to the Assyrian empire as Adummatu and is known in modern times as Dumat Al-Jandal.
- Dumah is the name of one of the seven compartments of Gehenna.
- In the video game Legacy of Kain: Soul Reaver, Dumah is the name of a boss character. He is the vampire brother of Raziel, and along with Turel is the one who cast him into the Abyss on Kain's orders. In reference to the meaning of his name, when finally confronted, he has been killed by vampire hunters, and his corpse is sitting silently on a throne.
- Doma (a variation of Dumah) the Angel of Silence is a card in the card game Yu-Gi-Oh!.
- Dumah makes an appearance in Neil Gaiman's The Sandman (DC Comics), specifically in "The Season of Mists". He, along with Ramiel, become the keepers of Hell after Lucifer abandons his throne.
- Dumat, the Dragon of Silence in the Dragon Age series of video games, is named after this angel. Within the series' backstory, he was the first of the Old Gods to become an archdemon, necessitating the creation of the Grey Wardens (the series' primary protagonists) to stop him, some 1,200 years before the series begins.
- In the video game Fire Emblem Gaiden and its remake Fire Emblem Echoes: Shadows of Valentia, Duma is the final boss of the story. He believes that humanity is weak and that hardship makes them strong. He is the patron deity of Rigel and is worshiped as the War Father, but becomes denounced as a Fell God by some of the characters because of his descent into madness. In his corruption, he takes the form of a large one-eyed green dragon.
- An angel named Dumah appears in The CW television series Supernatural, portrayed by Erica Cerra. She debuts in the "War of the Worlds" episode of season thirteen.

== See also ==
- List of angels in theology
- Dumah (son of Ishmael)
- Munkar and Nakir
- Zabaniyya

== Bibliography ==
- Gallagher, William R. (1999), Sennacherib's campaign to Judah: new studies (Illustrated ed.), BRILL, ISBN 978-90-04-11537-8
- Hoyland, Robert G. (2001), Arabia and the Arabs: from the Bronze Age to the coming of Islam (Illustrated, reprint ed.), Routledge, ISBN 978-0-415-19535-5
