= Seh Gonbad, North Khorasan =

Village in North Khorasan province, Iran

Seh Gonbad Persian: سه گنبد
- Village
- Location within Iran
- Coordinates: 37°14′42″N 58°06′10″E
- Country: Iran
- Province: North Khorasan
- County: Faruj
- District: Central
- Rural District: Shah Jahan

Population (2016)
  - Total: 1,274
- Time zone: UTC+3:30 (IRST)

Seh Gonbad (Persian: سه گنبد) (Note: Also known as Kamālābād) is a village in Shah Jahan Rural District of the Central District in Faruj County, North Khorasan province, Iran.

== Demographics ==
=== Population ===
At the time of the 2006 National Census, the village's population was 1,148 in 300 households. The following census in 2011 counted 1,303 people in 384 households. The 2016 census measured the population of the village as 1,274 people in 390 households.
