= Seh Gonbad, Razavi Khorasan =

Seh Gonbad سه گنبد
- Village
- Location within Iran
- Coordinates: 36°01′22″N 58°50′15″E
- Country: Iran
- Province: Razavi Khorasan
- County: Nishapur
- Bakhsh: Central
- Rural District: Darbqazi

Population (2006)
  - Total: 144
- Time zone: UTC+3:30 (IRST)
  - Summer (DST): UTC+4:30 (IRDT)

Seh Gonbad (Persian: سه گنبد) is a village in Darbqazi Rural District, in the Central District of Nishapur County, Razavi Khorasan Province, Iran. As of the 2006 census it had a population of 144 divided between 32 families.
