= Illiyin =

Qur'anic term

Illiyin or Illiyun (Arabic: عِلِّيِّين, عِلِّيُّون, romanized: ʿilliyyīn, -ūn literally: Heaven, Upperworld) is a Quranic term referring to either the "most high" and "supreme" places above Jannah, i.e. the Garden of Eden or Paradise, in the seventh Heaven closest to the Throne of God (al-ʿArsh), or, according to a different interpretation, a register for the blessed or record of the righteous, which is mentioned in Verses 83:18–20 of the Quran. It is also understood as the abode of the believers before Resurrection. The antithesis of Illiyin is Sijjin.

== Etymology ==
The word as an adjective, apparently pronounced in such a way to parallel with sijjīn (a commonly seen aspect of the Quran), is a plural of ʿaliyy (Arabic: عَلِيّ) meaning "high, exalted, lofty, excellent" from the very common root ʿ-L-W (ع ل و) related to exalting, becoming high or elevating. The very similar-sounding Hebrew word ʿelyṓn (עֶלְיוֹן) meaning "upper, top, uppermost" or "Most High" as an epithet of God, derives from an equivalent root but is however not a direct cognate since Hebrew plurals end in "-im".

== In Shia tradition ==
According to some Shia traditions, the Ahl al-Bayt were created from the earth of Illiyin.

== See also ==
- Elyon
- Heaven
- Elysium
- Paradise
