= Khosraviyeh, North Khorasan =

Village in North Khorasan province, Iran

Khosraviyeh Persian: خسرويه
- Village
- Location within Iran
- Coordinates: 37°07′38″N 57°59′46″E
- Country: Iran
- Province: North Khorasan
- County: Faruj
- District: Central
- Rural District: Shah Jahan

Population (2016)
  - Total: 662
- Time zone: UTC+3:30 (IRST)

Khosraviyeh (Persian: خسرويه) (Note: Also romanized as Khosravīyeh) is a village in Shah Jahan Rural District of the Central District in Faruj County, North Khorasan province, Iran.

== Demographics ==
=== Population ===
At the time of the 2006 National Census, the village's population was 615 in 195 households. The following census in 2011 counted 754 people in 270 households. The 2016 census measured the population of the village as 662 people in 221 households.
