= Barzakh =

Islamic eschatological term, place where dead go before Judgment Day

Barzakh (Arabic: برزخ) is an Arabic word meaning "barrier", or "hindrance", "separation". In Islamic eschatology, it denotes a barrier separating the world of humans (heaven, earth, underworld) from the world of spirits. It can also refer to a medial phase or stage between an individual's death and their resurrection in the Hereafter. It is also considered as a place where souls rest until the Day of Judgement. It bears resemblance to the intermediate state in Christianity.

Some scholars believe that good Muslims will have a heavenly experience during this time, and sinners will experience suffering; while some Shia scholars believe the experience will not be like the physical pain or pleasure of the temporal world.

Scholars have different definitions of Barzakh. According to Al-Ghazālī, Barzakh may be the place for those who go neither to hell nor to heaven. According to Ibn Hazm, Barzakh is also the place for unborn souls, which are elsewhere described as residing in the lowest of the seven heavens, where an angel blows them into the wombs of women.

== Etymology ==
Although listed in Wehr's Dictionary of Modern Written Arabic under the root b-r-z, it is likely that the word is borrowed from Middle Persian.

== Quran and hadith ==
Mentioned only three times in the Quran, and just once specifically as the barrier between the corporeal and ethereal, Barzakh is portrayed as a place in which, after death, the spirit is separated from the body – freed to contemplate the wrongdoing of its former life. Despite the gain of recognizance, it cannot utilize action. The other two occurrences refer to Barzakh as an impenetrable barrier between fresh and salt water. While fresh and salt water may intermingle, an ocean remains distinct from a river.

In the hadith tradition, Ibn al-Qayyim writes that souls in al-Barzakh are grouped with others matching in purity or impurity.

== Separation of body and soul ==
In Islam, the soul and the body are independent of each other. This is significant in Barzakh, because only a person's soul goes to Barzakh and not their physical body. Since one's soul is divorced from their body in Barzakh, the belief is that no progress or improvements to one's past life can be made. If a person experienced a life of sin and worldly pleasures, one cannot try to perform good deeds in order to reach Jannah. Whatever one does in their lifetime is final and cannot be changed or altered in Barzakh. However, there is belief that the fire which represents the own bad deeds can already be seen in Barzakh, and that the spiritual pain caused by this can lead to purification of the soul.

== Interpretations ==
In mainstream Sunni and Shia Islam, Barzakh has been defined as "an intermediary stage between this life and another life in the Hereafter"; "an interval or a break between individual death and resurrection"; "The Stage Between this World and the Hereafter"; the period between a person's death and his resurrection on the Day of Resurrection. Based in least in part on the verse "Before them is a Partition till the Day they are raised up." (Q.23:100) Some scholars believe that good Muslims will have a heavenly experience during this time, and sinners will experience suffering; while some Shia scholars believe there is no experience of physical pain or pleasure in Barzakh.

=== Mainstream scholarly discourse ===
Some Muslim scholars stress the importance of Barzakh, while others simply ignore it.

- Modern Muslim thinkers de-emphasize Barzakh, and focus instead on a person's individual life and the Day of Judgment. In this view, the state of Barzakh is simply looked past and skipped once a person dies.
- Muslim scholars who do believe in Barzakh still have varying interpretations of this intermediate state based on different traditions. Some traditions suggest that a person's deeds in their life will affect their experience in Barzakh. In these traditions, the state known as "Azaabul-Qabr," will be one where a person is punished for their deeds in their past life. While those in a second state known as "Tan'eemu Ahlit-Taa'ah Fil Qabr," will receive the blessings and bounties of Allah because of their faith and good deeds.
- Al-Ghazālī states, "After the First Blast, all created beings shall abide for forty (it is unknown if it is a year or month or etc.) in the Intermediate Realm barzakh. Then shall God quicken Seraphiel, and command him to deliver the Second Blast, as He has said (Exalted is He!): Then shall it be blown again, and lo! they stand, beholding : they shall be on their feet, watching the Resurrection."
- Al-Zamakhshari explains Barzakh to mean hā'il, "an obstacle." His adaptation of the meaning of the word coincides with mentions of Barzakh in Quran 25:53.
- Abdullah Yusuf Ali referred to a Barzakh state as a "quiescent state." The soul lies in a resting state until Yawm al-Qiyāmah.

=== Sufism ===
In Sufism the Barzakh or Alam-e-Araf is not only where the soul resides after death, but also a place it can visit during sleep and meditation.

Ibn 'Arabi defines Barzakh as the intermediate realm or "isthmus". It is between the World of Corporeal Bodies and the World of Spirits, and is a means of contact between the two worlds. Without it, there would be no contact between the two and both would cease to exist. It is described as simple and luminous, like the World of Spirits, but also able to take on many different forms just like the World of Corporeal Bodies can. In broader terms Barzakh, "is anything that separates two things". It has been described as the dream world in which the dreamer is in both life and death.

The word Barzakh can also refer to a person. Chronologically between Jesus and Muhammad is the contested, self-claimed prophet Khalid. Ibn Arabi considers this man to be a Barzakh, meaning a Perfect Human Being. Chittick explains that the Perfect Human acts as the Barzakh or "isthmus" between God and the world.

According to Ibn Arabi, Khalid was a prophet whose message never emerged. Before he died, he told his sons to open his tomb forty days after his death to receive the message of Barzakh. The sons, however, feared that they would be looked down upon for opening their dead father's tomb; therefore they decided not to exhume their father. Thus, his message was never shared. An Ottoman scholar explained that for Khalid to give the knowledge of Barzakh he would have had to travel through the different worlds and then return; because he was not exhumed, his message was never heard. Ibn Arabi explains that because this mission ended in failure, it does not conflict with the Prophet Mohammed's statement: "I am nearest of men to Jesus son of Mary, for there is no prophet between him and me."

=== Shia Pan ===
The idea of Barzakh has significance in Shia Islam, though different from its significance in Sufism. The Prophet and the Shia Imams, particularly the sixth Imam (Ja'far al-Sadiq), have explained through various hadiths the treatment, condition, processes, and other intricate details regarding the passage of Barzakh. In Shia theology, there are seven checkpoints in Barzakh. The first is kindness/trust/wilayah. Second is salaat. Third is zakaat or khums. Fourth is fasting. Fifth is hajj. Sixth is cleanliness. Seventh is rights. It is believed that the terms and conditions to understand Barzakh are limited in scope and full comprehension because it is Shia's belief that it is incomprehensible, to a certain degree, until one actually reaches the realm beyond our physical world. A common analogy used is that of a baby in the womb. Just as the baby cannot possibly begin to understand the vast outside world until they experience it for themselves, we cannot hope to understand what Barzakh entails until we transition there ourselves. Though despite this obstacle, the Shia Imams, as cited through various sayings, have explained Barzakh to a significant degree as compared to other sects within Islam.

=== Contemporary interpretations and uses ===
The term has also found its way into more contemporary, non-religious sectors of life. At least three bands have adopted the name "Barzakh," including an Indonesian Jakarta black metal band, a Tunisian oriental metal band and Naqash Ali Shawkat band. Barzakh was used as the title of a 2011 documentary following citizens of a war-torn Chechen community searching for a lost friend who they believe may have transitioned from our physical world to the realm of Barzakh.

== Comparative theology ==
The concept of Barzakh has been compared to the Christian idea of an "intermediate state". It has been further compared to the purgatory although this is errorneous and the concept is closer to the idea of the limbo.

Aʿrāf is also thought of as a place where souls go whose good and bad deeds are too evenly matched to go directly to Jannah or Jahannam.

== See also ==
- Bardo
- Malakut
- Matarta in Mandaeism
- Punishment of the Grave
- Sheol
- Siahat-e Gharb
