= Naraka =

Hell in Indian religions

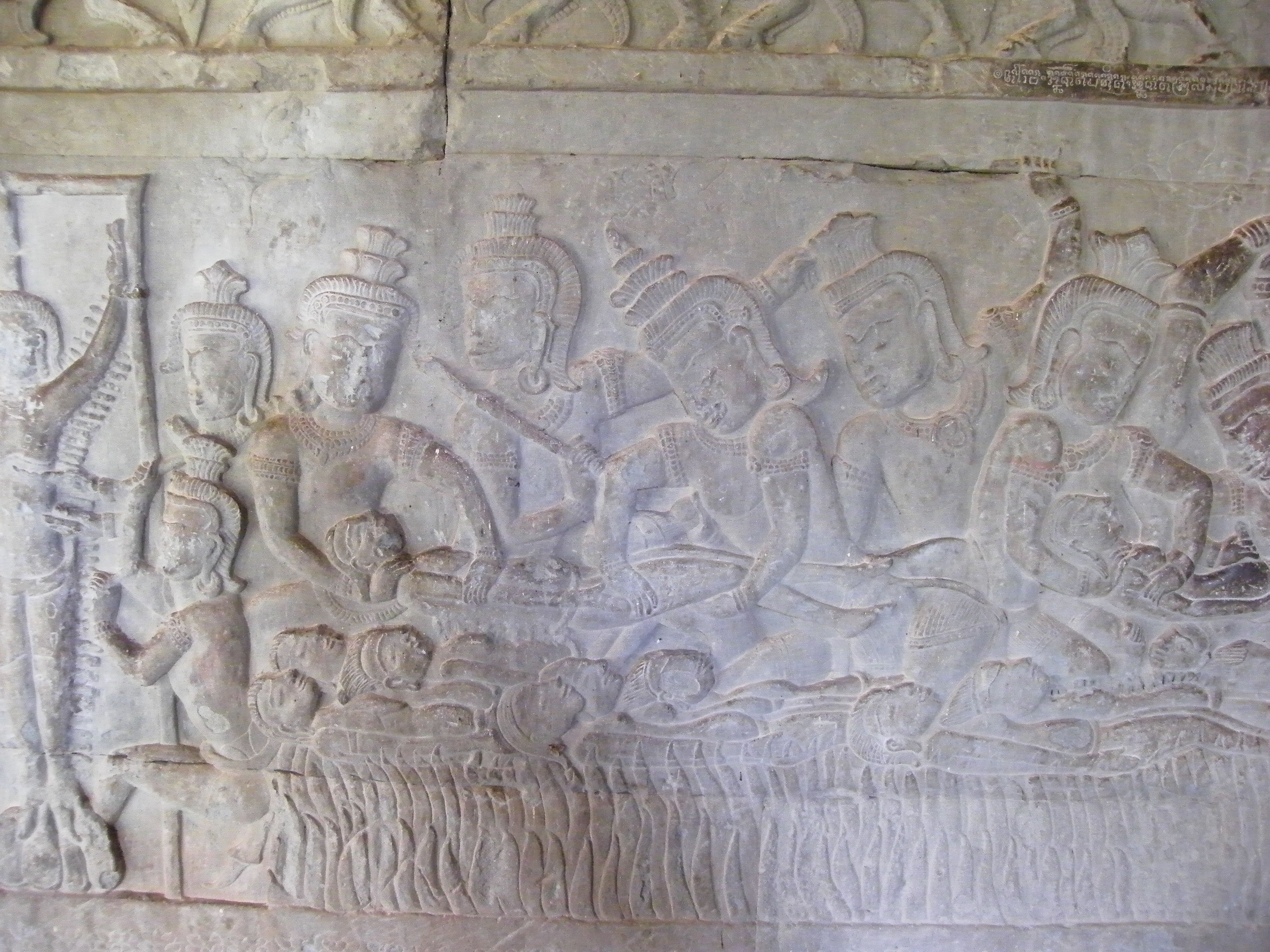
Angkor Wat bas-relief depicts spirits of the dead being laid on fire in Naraka.

Naraka (Sanskrit: नरक) is the realm of hell in Indian religions. According to schools of Hinduism, Jainism, and Buddhism, Naraka is a place of torment. The word Neraka (modification of Naraka) in Indonesian and Malaysian has also been used to describe the Islamic and Christian concepts of Hell. Naraka was also a Khmer word for hell in Cambodia.

Alternatively, the "hellish beings" that are said to reside in this underworld are often referred to as Narakas. These beings are also termed in Sanskrit as Narakiyas (Sanskrit: नारकीय, Nārakīya), Narakarnavas (Sanskrit: नरकार्णव, Narakārṇava), and Narakavasis (Sanskrit: नरकवासी, Narakavāsī). The Khmer Empire had blended with Buddhism and Hinduism which understands and represents the concept of Naraka which referred to realm of torment and suffering, often depicted as hell with its integration of worldviews.

== Hinduism ==
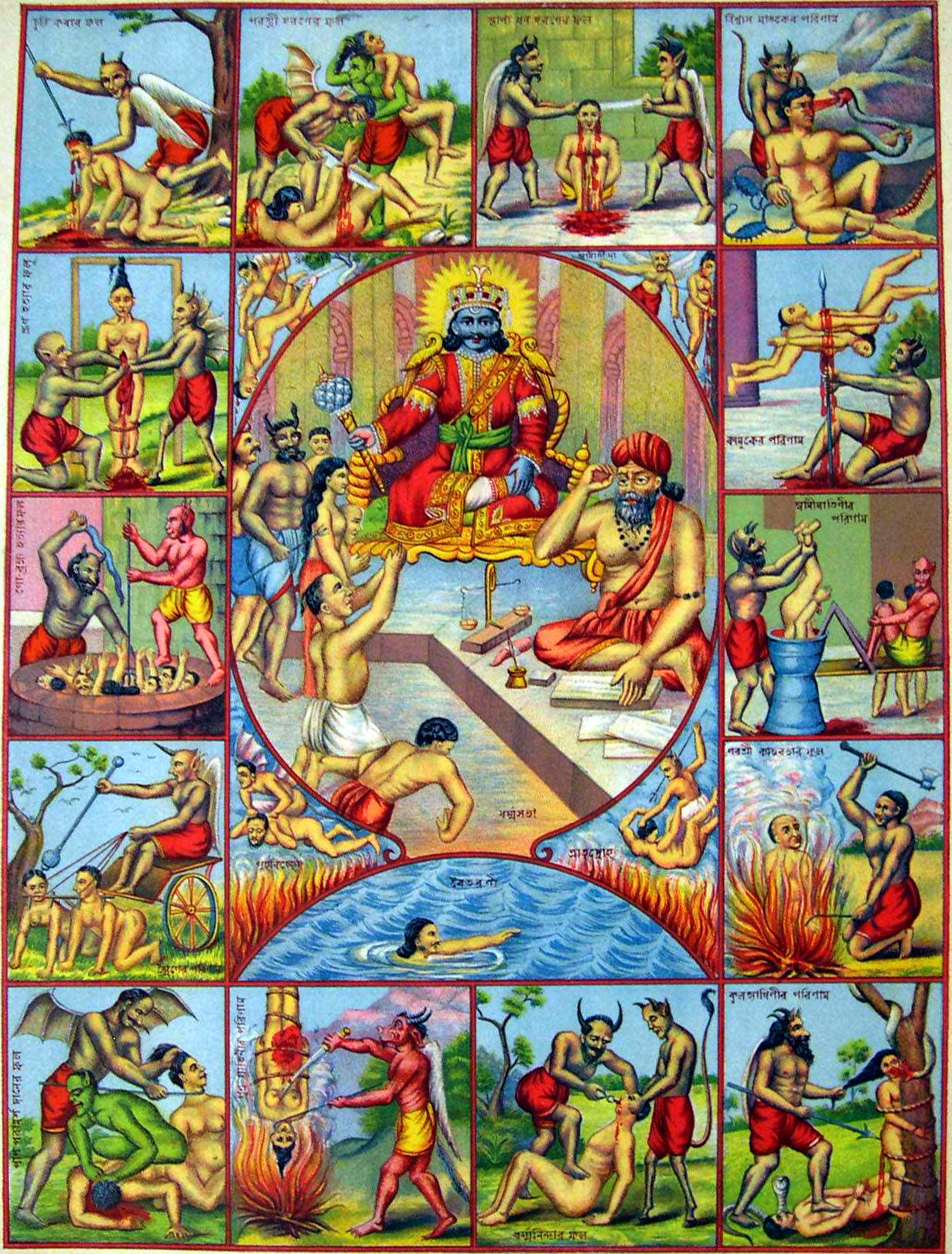
A large central panel portrays Yama the god of death (often referred to as Dharma) seated on a throne; to the left stands a demon. To the right of Yama sits Chitragupta, assigned with keeping detailed records of every human being and upon their death deciding how they are to be reincarnated, depending on their previous actions.

Naraka is a realm in the Vedas, a place where souls are sent for the expiation of their sins. It is mentioned primarily in the Dharmashastras, Itihasas, and the Puranas, but also described in the Vedic samhitas, the Aranyakas and the Upanishads. Some Upanishads speak of 'darkness' instead of hell. A summary of the Upanishads and the Bhagavad Gita mentions hell several times. Adi Sankara also mentions it in his commentary on the Vedanta sutra. With the exception of the views of one Hindu philosopher, Madhva, it is not seen as a place of eternal damnation within Hinduism.

In Puranas like Bhagavata Purana, Garuda Purana, and Vishnu Purana, there are elaborate descriptions of many hells. They are situated above the Garbhodaka Ocean. The Vishnu Purana mentions the names of the various Narakas:

The names of the different Narakas are as follows: Raurava, Śūkara, Rodha, Tāla, Viśasana, Mahājvāla, Taptakumbha, Lavaṇa, Vimohana, Rudhirāndha, Vaitaranī, Krimīśa, Krimibhojana, Asipatravana, Kṛṣṇa, Lālābhakṣa, Dāruṇa, Pūyavāha, Pāpa, Vahnijvāla, Adhośiras, Sandansa, Kālasūtra, Tamas, Avīci, Śvabhojana, Apratiṣṭha, and another Avīci. These and many other fearful hells are the awful provinces of the kingdom of Yama, terrible with instruments of torture and with fire; into which are hurled all those who are addicted when alive to sinful practices.

— Vishnu Purana, Book 2, Chapter 6

Yama, the god of death and justice, judges living beings after their death and assigns appropriate punishments. For instance, the murderer of a Brahman, the stealer of gold, or a drinker of wine goes to the hell termed as Shukara, meaning swine. According to some Vedanta schools of thought, Nitya-samsarins (forever transmigrating ones) can experience Naraka for expiation. After the period of punishment is complete, they are reborn on earth in human or bestial bodies. Therefore, Naraka is not an abode of everlasting punishment.

Yama Loka is the abode of Yama. Yama is also referred to as the Dharmaraja, or the king of dharma; Yama Loka may be compared to a temporary purgatorium for sinners (papi). According to Hindu scriptures, Yama's divine assistant, Chitragupta, maintains a record of the individual deeds of every living being in the world, and based on the complete audit of their deeds, dispatches the soul of the deceased either to Svarga (Heaven), or to the various Narakas, according to the nature of their sins. The scriptures describe that even people who have done a majority of good deeds could come to Yama Loka for redemption from the minor sins they have committed, and once the punishments have been served for those sins, they could be sent for rebirth to earth or to heaven.

At the time of death, sinful souls are vulnerable for capture by Yamaduttas, servants of Yama (who comes personally only in special cases). According to the Bhagavata Purana, Yama orders his servants to leave Vaishnavas alone. Sri Vaishnavas are taken by Vishnuduttas to Vaikuntha, and Gaudiya Vaishnavas to Goloka.

== Buddhism ==
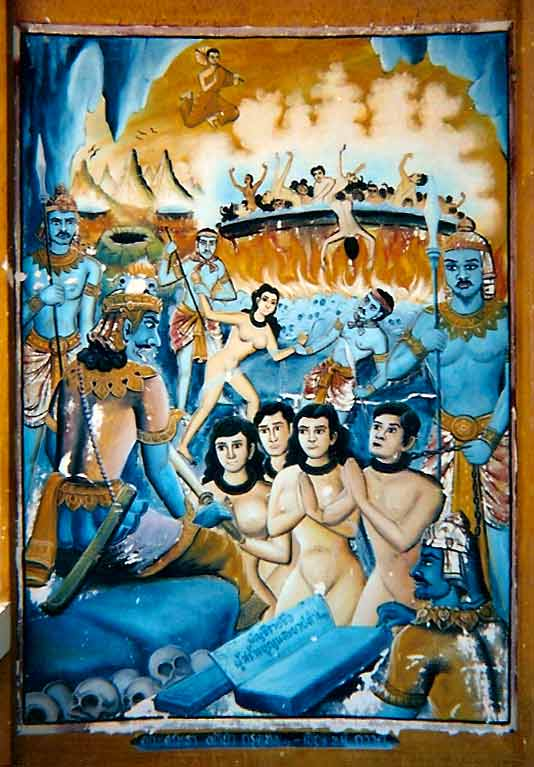
A mural from a temple in northern Thailand. The unclothed spirits of the dead are brought before Yama for judgement. In the background, Mālaya (พระมาลัย) watches from above as sinners are fried in a large oil cauldron.

In Buddhism, Naraka refers to the worlds of greatest suffering. Buddhist texts describe a vast array of tortures and realms of torment in Naraka; an example is the Devadūta-sutta from the Pāli Canon. The descriptions vary from text to text and are not always consistent with each other. Though the term is often translated as "hell", unlike the Abrahamic hells, Naraka is not eternal, though when a timescale is given, it is suggested to be extraordinarily long. There is not inherently any God required to be involved in determining a being's entry and exit to and from the realm. Rather, the mind ends up here—as is the case with all the other realms in the Buddhist cosmology—by natural law: the law of karma, and they remain until the negative karma that brought them there has been used up.

== Jainism ==
In Jainism, Naraka is the name given to realm of existence in Jain cosmology having great suffering. The length of a being's stay in a Naraka is not eternal, though it is usually very long—measured in billions of years. A soul is born into a Naraka as a direct result of its previous karma (actions of body, speech, and mind), and resides there for a finite length of time until its karma has achieved its full result. After its karma is used up, it may be reborn in one of the higher worlds as the result of an earlier karma that had not yet ripened. Jain texts mention that these hells are situated in the seven grounds at the lower part of the universe. The seven grounds are:

1. Ratna prabha
2. Sharkara prabha
3. Valuka prabha
4. Panka prabha
5. Dhuma prabha
6. Tamaha prabha
7. Mahatamaha prabha

== Popular culture ==
Naraka is the titled of the seventh track Boards of Canada's fifth studio album Inferno. The second half of the track features a reoccurring chant that goes as follows:

"Hare Krishna, Hare Krishna, Krishna Krishna Hare Hare Hare Rama, Hare Rama, Rama Rama Hare Hare"

== See also ==
- Shurangama Sutra – Volume 6, Chapter 5: The Twelve Categories of Living Beings
- Zamhareer – Cold hell in Islam
- List of numbers in Hindu scriptures
- Contrapasso – the concept of hell as a reflection of the sinners' offences in life
