= Inferno =

Inferno most often refers to:

- Hell, an afterlife place of suffering
- Conflagration, a large uncontrolled fire

Inferno may also refer to:

== Arts and media ==
=== Comics ===
- Inferno (DC Comics), a character in Legion of Super-Heroes
- Inferno (Frank Verrano), a Mighty Crusaders character
- Inferno (Exemplar), a character in the Marvel Comics team Exemplars
- Inferno (Marvel Comics), a crossover involving the X-Men
- Inferno!, a Warhammer anthology magazine mixing text and comic stories
- Inferno, a title from Caliber Comics
- Armageddon: Inferno, a DC Comics storyline connected with Armageddon 2001
- Judge Dredd: Inferno, a story line featuring Judge Grice
- Inferno, an alternate version of Legion of Super-Heroes member Sun Boy
- Inferno (Dante Pertuz), a Marvel Comics character

=== Film ===
- L'Inferno, a 1911 Italian film
- Inferno (1953 film), a film noir by Roy Ward Baker
- Inferno (1980 film), an Italian horror film by Dario Argento
- Inferno (1995 film), directed by Peter Keglevic
- Inferno (1997 film), starring Don "The Dragon" Wilson
- Inferno (1998 film), a TV movie directed by Ian Barry
- Inferno (1999 film), starring Jean-Claude Van Damme
- Inferno (1999 Portuguese film), directed by Joaquim Leitão
- Inferno (2000 film), or Pilgrim, 2000, directed by Harley Cokeliss
- Inferno (2001 film), a British "short" movie directed by Paul Kousoulides
- Inferno (2014 film), a Slovenian film, directed by Vinko Möderndorfer
- Inferno (2016 film), American thriller based on Dan Brown's novel of same name
- Inferno, a villain character in the film Scooby-Doo! and WWE: Curse of the Speed Demon

=== Gaming ===
- Inferno (Counter-Strike), a multiplayer map in the Counter-Strike series of video games
- Inferno (Judges Guild), a 1980 adventure for fantasy role-playing games, a 'paper and pencil' game
- Inferno (role-playing game), a 1994 fantasy role-playing game
- Inferno, an episode in the video game Doom
- Inferno (video game), a 1994 space flight simulation game by Digital Image Design
- Inferno (Soulcalibur), a boss character in Soulcalibur
- Alone in the Dark: Inferno, an updated version of the video game Alone in the Dark
- Little Inferno, a 2012 puzzle game

=== Literature ===
- Inferno (Dante), the first part of Dante Alighieri's 14th-century narrative poem Divine Comedy
- Inferno (Strindberg novel), 1897, by August Strindberg
- Hell (Barbusse novel) (or Hell), 1908, by Henri Barbusse
- Inferno, a concept of infernality of Nature in The Bull's Hour, a 1968 novel by Ivan Yefremov
- The Inferno, a 1973 novel by Fred Hoyle and Geoffrey Hoyle
- Inferno (Niven and Pournelle novel), a 1976 novel by Larry Niven and Jerry Pournelle
- Isaac Asimov's Inferno, a 1994 novel by Roger MacBride Allen
- Inferno, a 2006 novel in the Bionicle Legends series, by Greg Farshtey
- Inferno (Star Wars novel), a 2007 novel by Troy Denning
- Inferno (anthology), 2007, edited by Ellen Datlow
- Inferno (a poet's novel), a 2010 novel by Eileen Myles
- Inferno (Brown novel), a 2013 mystery thriller novel by Dan Brown
- "The Inferno", the second chapter of the 2022–2023 graphic novel Gert's Inferno by Skottie Young

=== Music ===
==== Albums ====
- Inferno (Marty Friedman album), 2014
- Inferno (Petra Marklund album), 2012
- Inferno (Motörhead album), 2004
- Inferno (Entombed album), 2003
- Inferno, by Biréli Lagrène, 1988
- Inferno (Metamorfosi album), 1973
- Inferno: Last in Live, 1998, by Dio
- Inferno (soundtrack), by Keith Emerson, from the 1980 film
- Inferno (Tangerine Dream album)
- Inferno, by Alien Sex Fiend which is the soundtrack for the video game Inferno
- Inferno, by Project Pitchfork
- Inferno (Boards of Canada album), 2026

==== Songs ====
- "Inferno" (song), by Bella Poarch and Sub Urban
- "Inferno", by OsamaSon from Psykotic
- "Inferno", by Amaranthe from Helix
- "The Inferno", by Dir En Grey from Arche
- "Inferno", by Extol from Undeceived
- "Inferno", by Kreator from Voices of Transgression – A 90s Retrospective
- "Inferno (Unleash the Fire)", by Symphony X from The Odyssey
- "Inferno", by Lordi
- "Inferno", the opening to first arc of Fire Force by Mrs. Green Apple

==== Other uses in music ====
- Infernö, a Norwegian thrash metal band
- Inferno Metal Festival, an annual music festival in Oslo, Norway
- Zbigniew Robert Promiński or Inferno (born 1978), drummer with the band Behemoth
- Inferno, guitarist with Cirith Gorgor

=== Television ===
- "Inferno" (Captain Scarlet and the Mysterons), a 1968 episode
- "Inferno" (Coupling), a 2000 episode
- "Inferno", fourth episode of the 1965 Doctor Who serial The Romans
- Inferno (Doctor Who), a 1970 serial from the British science fiction series
- "Inferno" (Mutant X), a 2003 episode
- "Inferno" (Stargate Atlantis), a 2006 episode
- Series titles of reality game shows on MTV:
  - Real World/Road Rules Challenge: The Inferno (2004)
  - Real World/Road Rules Challenge: The Inferno II (2005)
  - Real World/Road Rules Challenge: The Inferno 3 (2007)
- Inferno, a female gladiator in Gladiators
- Team Inferno, Disney Channel Games Red Team

=== Other uses in arts and media ===
- Inferno (G.I. Joe), a fictional character in the G.I. Joe universe
- Inferno (wrestler), ring name of wrestler Jemma Palmer

== Sports teams ==
- Brampton Inferno, a Canadian Lacrosse League team
- Columbia Inferno, an ECHL hockey team based in Columbia, South Carolina
- Indianapolis Inferno, a Great Lakes Junior Hockey League team
- Lancaster Inferno (NPSL), a defunct National Premier Soccer League team (2008)
- Lancaster Inferno (UWS), a Women's Premier Soccer League team
- Phoenix Inferno, a defunct Major Indoor Soccer League team (1980–1983)
- Tampa Bay Inferno, a Women's Football Alliance team
- The teams of Alverno College, a Roman Catholic college in Milwaukee, Wisconsin
- West Carleton Inferno, a National Capital Junior Hockey League team

== People ==
- Inferno (wrestler), ring name of wrestler Jemma Palmer
- Zbigniew Robert Promiński or Inferno (born 1978), drummer with the band Behemoth
- Inferno, guitarist with Cirith Gorgor
- Pedro de Ataíde Inferno, Captain-major of Portuguese Ceylon from 1564 to 1565

== Technology ==
- Inferno (operating system), a distributed operating system started at Bell Labs
- Inferno (software), a visual effects software system
- Kyosho Inferno, a radio-controlled car produced by Kyosho

== Other uses ==
- Inferno (horse), a Canadian thoroughbred racehorse
- Inferno Peak, Antarctica
- Inferno Ridge, Antarctica
- Operation Inferno, a 1968 Israeli Defense Forces raid that escalated into the Battle of Karameh

== See also ==
- Infernus (born 1972)
- Dante's Inferno (disambiguation)
- L'Enfer (disambiguation)
- Infernal (disambiguation)
- Towering Inferno (disambiguation)
