= Tirad ibn Muhammad ibn Ali al-Zaynabi =

11th-century Iraqi muhaddith, diplomat, and government official

Abū'l-Fawāris Ṭirād ibn Muḥammad ibn ʿAlī az-Zaynabī was an 11th-century Iraqi muhaddith, diplomat, and government official who served as the naqīb al-nuqabā' under the Abbasid caliphate from 1061 until his death in 1098. He wrote two books of his own, neither of which are known to have survived.

== Name and titles ==
His name is variously vocalized as Ṭirād or Ṭarrād in modern sources, although according to Andreas Görke, "Ṭirād seems to be the correct reading".

Based on the certifications of the Kitāb al-Amwāl, he is sometimes addressed with the laqab al-Kāmil, and he also had the title Shihāb al-Ḥaḍratayn, or "shooting star of the two courts". What the "two courts" referred to is unclear – usually at the time it referred to both the Abbasid and Seljuk courts, indicating that Ṭirād may have associated with the Seljuks as well as the Abbasids, but his father had a similar title Niẓām al-Ḥaḍratayn and probably died before the Seljuks were in Baghdad, so it may have a different meaning.

== Background and early life ==
He was born in 1008 (398 AH) into the influential Zaynabī family, whose members had held the chief naqīb position for several generations. The Zaynabī family claimed descent from Zaynab, the daughter of the 8th-century Abbasid prince Sulaymān ibn ʿAlī al-Hāshimī, hence their name.

He appears to have studied hadith from a young age, following a practice of children attending lectures by elderly muhaddiths in order to minimize the length of the chain of transmission.

He adhered to the Hanafi madhhab. His brother, Nūr al-Hudā Abū Ṭālib al-Husayn ibn Muḥammad ibn ʿAlī al-Zaynabī was the first chief administrator of the Shrine College of Abu Hanifa in Baghdad when it opened in 1067; he also served as the college's second head professor of fiqh from 29 April 1069 (4 Rajab, 461 AH) until 3 June 1118 (11 Ṣafar, 512 AH).

== Career ==
Ṭirād served as naqīb al-nuqabā' (or naqīb al-hāshimiyīn) under the Abbasid caliphate. He was first appointed naqīb of Basra, and was later appointed naqīb al-nuqabā' in 1061. His job in this capacity involved supervising the naqībs of the different cities. He seems to have been a fairly high-ranking dignitary of the Abbasid caliph; he is documented serving as a caliphal envoy on numerous occasions, and in one case, while the caliph was away on a pilgrimage, acted as his deputy.

Ṭirād was also a noted muhaddith who was known as musnid al-ʿIrāq (musnid is an honorary title sometimes given to a hadith transmitter who has reached a high age and is "thus able to serve as a link between different generations", thus shortening the isnād or chain of transmission). He gave several dictations on hadith in the Mosque of al-Mansur in Baghdad (according to Abi'l-Wafa, he gave 25 in total), which is unusual because this was a Hanbali stronghold, indicating that he seems to have held high standing among the Hanbalis.

Ṭirād also was a transmitter of various books. Ibn Hajar al-Asqalani wrote that Ṭirād transmitted 19 works, including 3 of his own and 11 of Ibn Abi al-Dunya. He wrote a book on about the sahabah as well as his own dictations (Amālī Ṭirād), and his contemporary al-Bardani also wrote a compilation of Ṭirād's dictations called ʿAwālī Ṭirād, which was probably a collection of hadiths with short chains of transmission.

For example, one 13th-century manuscript copy of Ibn Abi al-Dunya's Kitāb al-wajal wat-tawaththuq bil-'amal, now in the Süleymaniye Library in Istanbul, attributes its chain of transmission through an ijazah of Ṭirād's, which was evidently studied under him in February/March 1097 (Rabi' I, 490 AH), shortly before his death.

Ṭirād also owned a manuscript of Abu Ubaid al-Qasim ibn Sallam's Kitāb al-Amwāl from sometime between 1070 (when the book is documented with another owner) and 1080 (when the first certificate of audition bearing his name appears) until at least 1097. A note in the book indicates that he had received his own certification for the book in 1021 (412 AH) under the supervision of Ibn al-Badi.

== Later life and death ==
Ṭirād went on a hajj to Mecca in 1096 (489 AH) and taught there and in Madinah during his journey. He died in 1098 (491 AH). His son ʿAli ibn Ṭirād al-Zaynabī directly succeeded Ṭirād as naqīb al-nuqabā' after his death. ʿAli later also served as vizier of the caliphs al-Mustarshid and al-Muqtafi.
