= Zamhareer =

Place of extreme cold at the bottom of hell

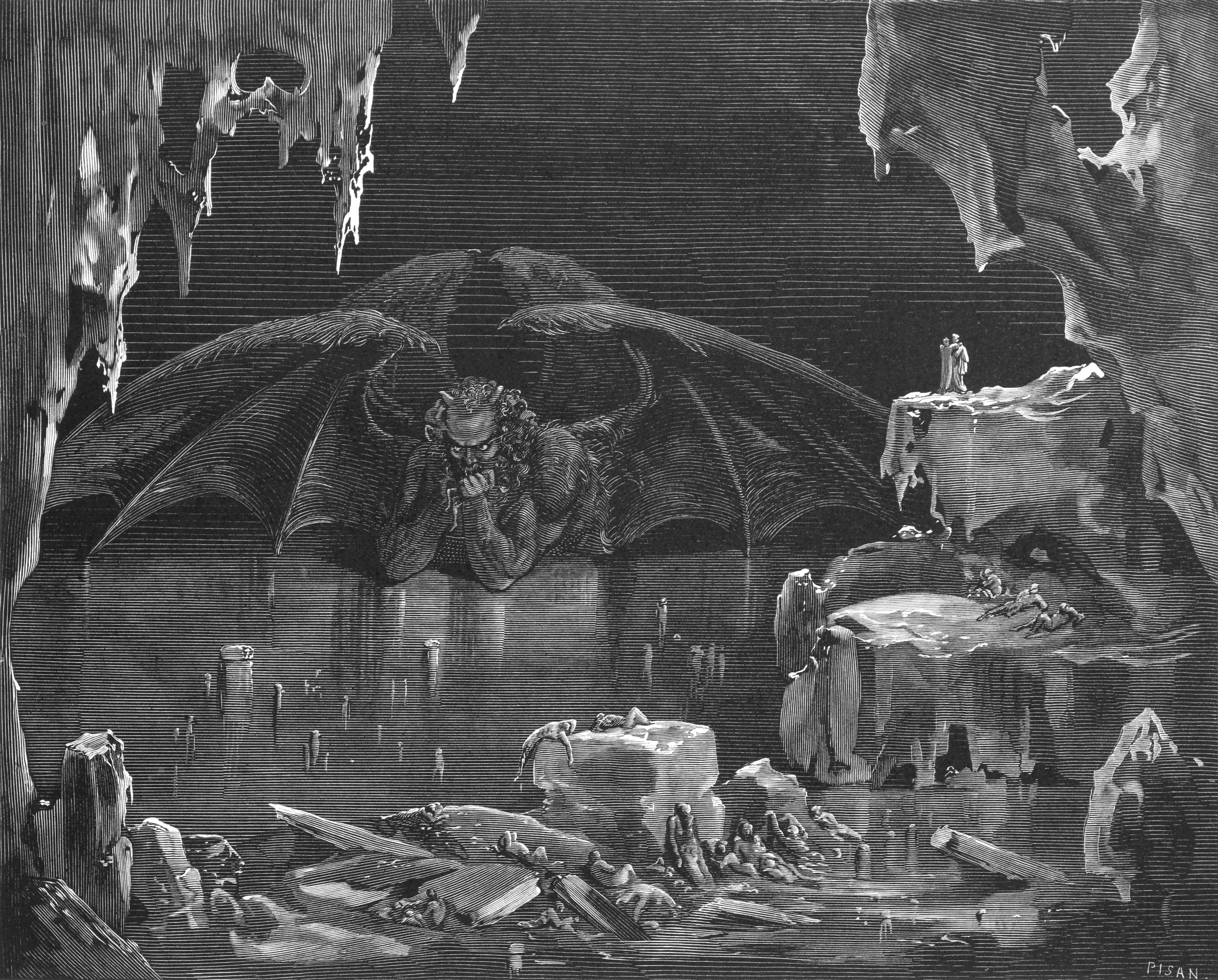
Dante's Satan trapped in a frozen underworld at the bottom of hell, probably inspired by Iblis' abode in Zamhareer.

Zamhareer (Arabic: الزمهرير, translit. al-zamharīr) is a place of extreme cold at the bottom of hell in some Islamic sources. It is characterized as being unbearably cold, with blizzards, ice, and snow.

The term is mentioned once in the Quran 76:13, stating the people in paradise will neither see the fires of the sun nor the unbearable cold of the moon. Some Islamic exegetes (mufassirun) advocate the idea that this term refers to a place in hell. Since they are created from fire, evil jinn and devils (shayāṭīn) have been suggested to be punished wherein, as the flames of hell would not hurt them. Positing Satan at the bottom of hell has a long tradition in Islamic theological discourse. Frozen at the bottom of hell symbolizes his impotence and restrictions.

According to hadith tradition (Bukhari and Sahih Muslim), God (Allah) allows Jahannam to take two breaths per year—one in summer and one in winter—releasing Hell's extreme temperatures upon earth. According to Ibn Abi al-Dunya, when the sinners beg the guardians of hell to leave the fire, they escape to Zamhareer and then beg to go back to the fire because it is unbearably cold. Others describe Zamhareer as a pit where the bones of the damned are scattered.
