= Metamorfosi (band) =

Italian symphonic rock band from Rome

Metamorfosi are an Italian symphonic rock band from Rome.

They have released four studio albums, ...e fu il sesto giorno (1972), Inferno (1973), Paradiso (2004), and Purgatorio (2016). The three latter are concept albums based on Dante's The Divine Comedy. Inferno in particular has received critical acclaim among progressive rock fans.

== History ==
The band was formed in the end of the 1960s, when the singer Jimmy Spitaleri joined the Christian beat group "I frammenti". After some first records and exhibitions, in 1972 they released their first album "... E fu il sesto giorno", characterised by late beat rock influences and spiritual lyrics.

In 1973 they published "Inferno, their most successful record, a concept album inspired by Dante's Divine Comedy. They style is now totally oriented to the symphonic progressive rock, dominated by Enrico Olivieri's organ and synthesisers. In 2021 the band reunited in Rome on the 700th anniversary of Dante's death, for a tribute concert in Dante's memory.

== Discography ==
- ...e fu il sesto giorno (1972)
- Inferno (1973)
- Paradiso (2004)
- La Chiesa Delle Stelle (Live in Rome) (2011)
- Purgatorio (2016)
