= Dante's Satan =

Satan in Dante's Inferno

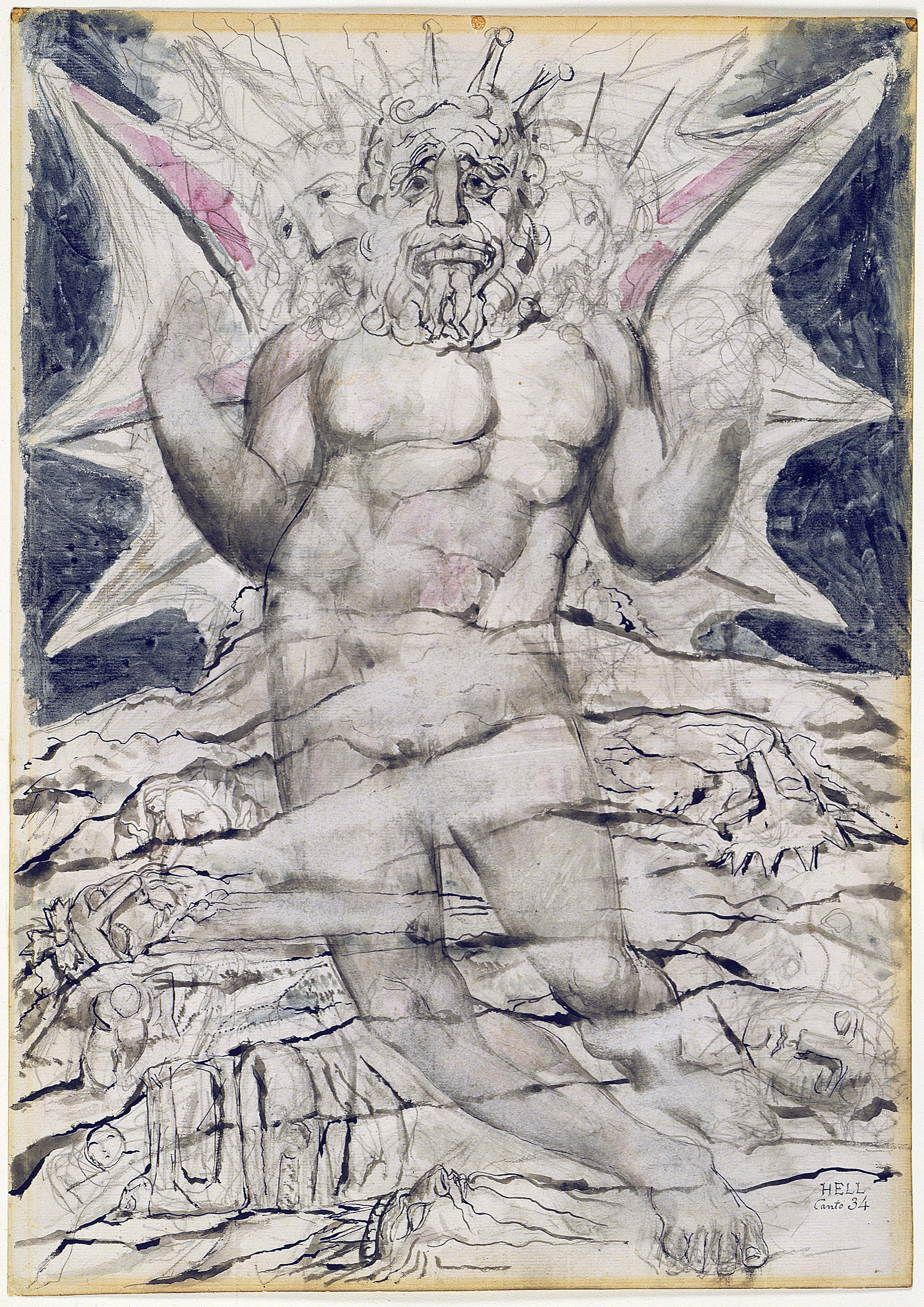
William Blake depicting Dante's Satan

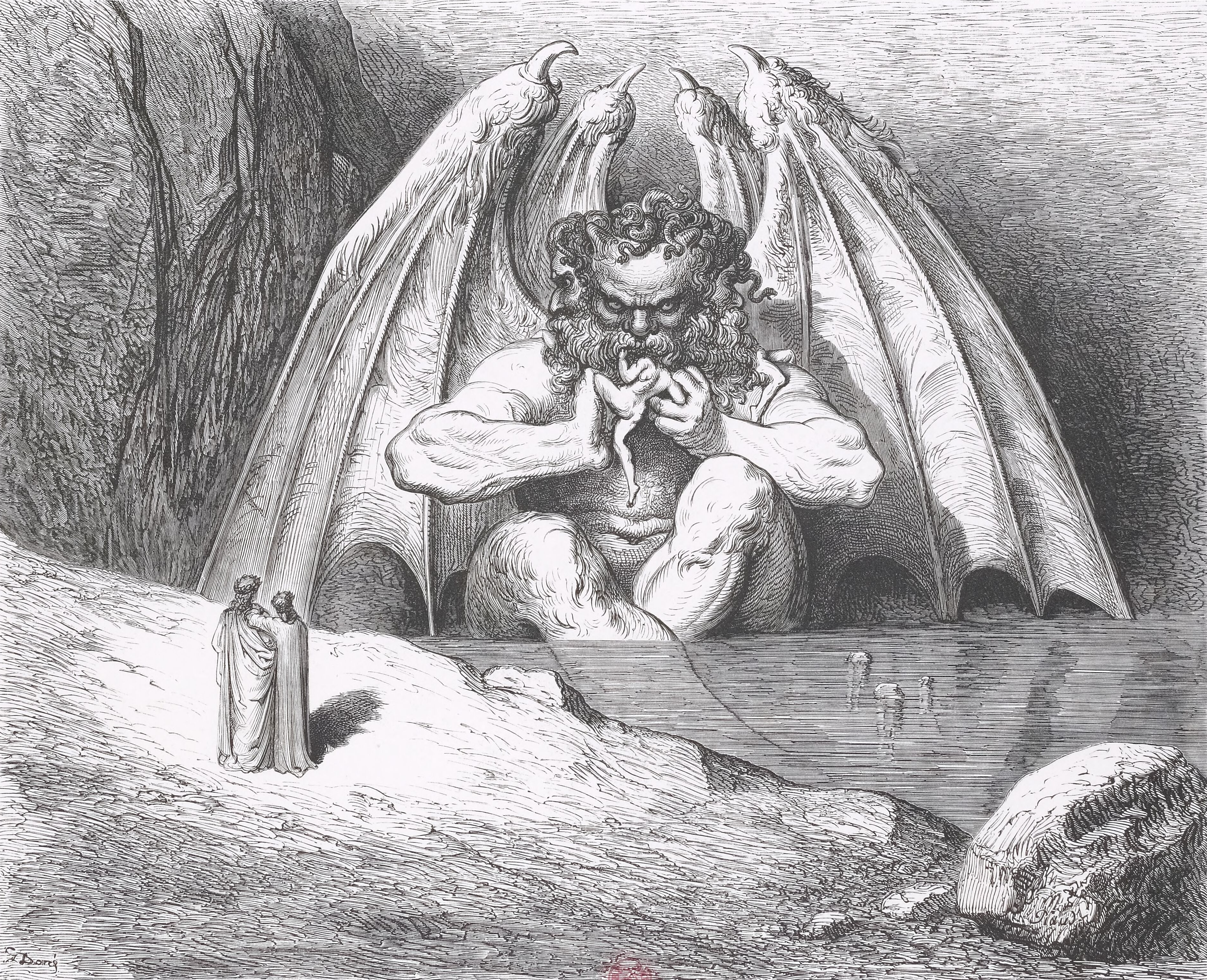
Satan is trapped in the frozen central zone in the Ninth Circle of Hell, Inferno, Canto 34. Illustration by Gustave Doré.

In Dante's Inferno, Satan is portrayed as a giant demon, frozen up to the waist in ice at the center of Hell. Satan has three faces and a pair of bat-like wings affixed under each chin. As Satan beats his wings, he creates a cold wind that continues to freeze the ice surrounding him and the other sinners in the Ninth Circle. The winds he creates are felt throughout the other circles of Hell. In his three mouths, he chews on Judas Iscariot, Marcus Junius Brutus and Gaius Cassius Longinus. Scholars consider Satan to be "a once splendid being (the most perfect of God's creatures) from whom all personality has now drained away". Satan, also known as Lucifer, was formerly the Angel of Light and once tried to usurp the power of God. As punishment, God banished Satan out of Heaven to an eternity in Hell as the ultimate sinner. Dante illustrates a less powerful Satan than most standard depictions; he is slobbering, wordless, and receives the same punishments in Hell as the rest of the sinners. In the text, Dante vividly illustrates Satan's grotesque physical attributes.

The Emperor of the kingdom dolorous
From his mid-breast forth issued from the ice;
And better with a giant I compare
Than do the giants with those arms of his;
Consider now how great must be that whole,
Which unto such a part conforms itself.
Were he as fair once, as he now is foul,
And lifted up his brow against his Maker,
Well may proceed from him all tribulation.
O, what a marvel it appeared to me,
When I beheld three faces on his head!
The one in front, and that vermilion was;
Two were the others, that were joined with this
Above the middle part of either shoulder,
And they were joined together at the crest;
And the right-hand one seemed 'twixt white and yellow;
The left was such to look upon as those
Who come from where the Nile falls valley-ward.
Underneath each came forth two mighty wings,
Such as befitting were so great a bird;
Sails of the sea I never saw so large.
No feathers had they, but as of a bat
Their fashion was; and he was waving them,
So that three winds proceeded forth therefrom.

== Description of the Ninth Circle ==
Dante's Hell is divided into nine circles, the ninth circle being divided further into four rings, their boundaries only marked by the depth of their sinners' immersion in the ice. Satan sits in the last ring, Judecca. It is in the fourth ring of the ninth circle, where the worst sinners, the betrayers to their benefactors, are punished. Here, these condemned souls, frozen into the ice, are completely unable to move or speak and are contorted into all sorts of fantastical shapes as a part of their punishment.

Unlike many other circles of Dante's Hell, these sinners remain unnamed. Even Dante is afraid to enter this last circle, as he nervously proclaimed, "I drew behind my leader’s back again."

Uncharacteristically of Dante, he remains silent in Satan's presence. Dante examines the sinners who are "covered wholly by ice, / showing like straw in glass – some lying prone, / and some erect, some with the head towards us, / the others with the bottoms of the feet; another like a bow bent feet to face." This circle of Hell is a complete separation from any life and, for Dante, "the deepest isolation is to suffer separation from the source of all light and life and warmth."

== Contrappasso: the poetic justice of Satan ==
The reason for Satan's eternal punishment was his desire to be as powerful as the Divine. When Satan was cast out of Heaven, he "excavated the underworld cosmos in which the damned are held". Satan's punishment is the opposite of what he was trying to achieve: power and a voice over God. Satan also is, in many ways, "the antithesis of Virgil; for he conveys at its sharpest the ultimate and universal pain of Hell: isolation." It is Virgil, Dante's guide through Hell, who tells Dante "that the inhabitants of the infernal region are those who have lost the good of intellect; the substance of evil, the loss of humanity, intelligence, good will, and the capacity to love." Satan stands at the center because he is the epitome of Dante's Hell.

He wept with all six eyes, and the tears fell over his three chins mingled with bloody foam. The teeth of each mouth held a sinner, kept as by a flax rake; thus he held three of them in agony.

== Religious significance ==
Dante's Satan remains a common image in popular portrayals. The answer to the question of how Satan ended up in the bottom of the pit in Dante's Inferno is in Christian theological history. Some interpretations of the Book of Isaiah, combined with apocryphal texts, explain that Satan was cast from Heaven, and fell to earth. Satan, the angel, was enamored of his own beauty, power, and pride, and attempted to usurp God's divine throne:

I will ascend to heaven; I will raise my throne above the stars of God; I will sit on the mount of assembly on the heights of Zaphon; I will ascend to the tops of the clouds, I will make myself like the Most High.

This immediately backfired on Satan. God sentenced him as a betrayer and banished him from Heaven. Dante uses this idea to create a physical place Satan created after his impact with the earth. According to Dante, the pit the Pilgrim climbs down to reach the center of Hell is literally the hole that Satan made when he fell to earth. The extra earth formed Mount Purgatory on the other side of the Earth.

William O'Grady has pointed out that those frozen in the ice perversely imitate God in the sense of being unmoved movers, but rather than moving by attracting us towards them, they move us by repelling us away from them, as evil was understood to do in scholastic philosophy. Thus, since they wanted to be God, Dante makes them godlike, but at the furthest distance removed from God.

== Islamic influence ==
The pictures of Dante's Satan bears close resemblances to Iblis, the chief fallen angel in Islamic tradition. Some descriptions of Dante's lowest hell match precisely the descriptions of Islamic eschatological literature, such as infidels growing into giants at the lowest layer of hell as means of punishment. Biblical tradition lacks such notion, and thus, cannot be the source of Dante's ideas. Likewise, there are giants in polytheistic beliefs, but they neither feature as the inhabitants of hell. The idea that hell consists of several layers, each adorned with a specific name, is also attested in Islamic beliefs. Reynold A. Nicholson sees inspirations for Dante's Inferno in the writings of the Muslim poet Sanai in particular.

While the Bible alludes only once to Satan's fall, the prominence of the fall of Iblis in the Quran is much greater; narrated in seven Surahs. The picture of Satan being chained at the bottom of hell also parallels the Islamic description of Iblis. According to Quranic exegesis, Iblis is chained in a frozen hell (Zamhareer) in a pit of the lowest earth.

== Works cited ==
- Alighieri, Dante. The Inferno of Dante. Trans. Robert Pinsky. New York, NY: Farrar, Straus, Giroux, 1994.
- Cassell, Anthony K. "The Tomb, the Tower, and the Pit: Dante's Satan." Italica 56.4 (1979): 331–351.
- "Circle 9, Cantos 31-34." Dante's Worlds. University of Texas at Austin. 27 Jan. 2007.
- Cunningham, Lawrence S. "Satan: a Theological Meditation." Theology Today 51 (1994). 27 Jan. 2007.
- Foster, Micheal, comp. Sandro Botticelli, the Drawings for the Divine Comedy. London: Royal Academy of Arts, 2000.
- Freccero, John. The Sign of Satan. MLN 80 (1965): 11–26.
- Gilbert, Allan. Dante and His Comedy. New York, NY: New York University P, 1963.
- Jacoff, Rachel, ed. Dante. Cambridge UP, 1963.
- Klonsky, Milton, comp. Blake's Dante, the Complete Illustrations to the Divine Comedy. New York, NY: Harmony Books, 1980.
- Korchak, Michael. "Portrayal of Heaven and Hell Through Art." Boston College. 27 Jan. 2007.
- Paolucci, Anne. "Dante's Satan and Milton's "Byronic Hero"" Italica 41 (1965): 139-149.
- "Satan: an Instrument for Dante and Milton." 27 Jan. 2007.
- Scott, John A. Understanding Dante. Notre Dame, IN: University of Notre Dame P, 2004.
- The Holy Bible Revised Standard Edition. 1962. World Publishing Company. Cleveland.
- Vittorini, Domenico. The Age of Dante. Syracuse, NY: Syracuse UP, 1957.
