= Dante's Inferno (disambiguation) =

Inferno is the first part of Dante Alighieri's 14th-century epic poem Divine Comedy.

Dante's Inferno may also refer to:

== Film ==
- L'Inferno, a 1911 Italian silent film by Giuseppe de Liguoro, loosely adapted from the Divine Comedy
- Dante's Inferno (1924 film), a silent film about a slum landlord sent to hell
- Dante's Inferno (1935 film), a film based around a fairground attraction depicting the inferno
- Dante's Inferno (1967 film), a television film about the tortured life of Dante Gabriel Rossetti
- Dante's Inferno (2007 film), a puppet comedy film version of Dante's hell

== Other uses ==
- Inferno (Niven and Pournelle novel), a modern retelling of Dante's Inferno, written by Larry Niven and Jerry Pournelle
- Dante's Inferno (ride), created 1971, was located at Coney Island, New York, US
- Dante's Inferno, a 1993 album by Transmetal
- "Dante's Inferno" (song), a 1995 song by Iced Earth
- Dante's Inferno (video game), 2010 game based on Alighieri's poem
  - Dante's Inferno: An Animated Epic, 2010 direct-to-DVD film based on the video game
- Dante's Inferno: A Graphic Novel Adaptation, a 2023 comic book by Paul and Gaëtan Brizzi
- Dante's Inferno (board game), 2003 resource management board game

== See also ==
- Inferno (disambiguation)
