= Onwards to the Spectral Defile =

Studio album by Cirith Gorgor
- Released: 1999
- Recorded: BBA, November–December 1998
- Genre: Black metal
- Label: Osmose
- Producers: E. Hermsen, Cirith Gorgor

Cirith Gorgor chronology
Onwards to the Spectral Defile (1999)	Unveiling the Essence (2001)

Onwards to the Spectral Defile is the debut album by black metal band Cirith Gorgor. It was released in 1999 by Osmose Productions.

== Track listing ==
All tracks written by Astaroth Daemonum & Asmoday, except where noted.

1. "The Declaration of Our Neverending War" – 4:21
2. "Winter Embraces Lands Beyond" – 5:36
3. "Through Burning Wastelands" – 3:35
4. "Sons of the New Dawn" – 7:29
5. "A Hymn to the Children of Heimdall/Darkness Returns" – 4:46
6. "Wandering Cirith Gorgor" – 5:12
7. "Ephel Duath (A Warrior's Tale)" – 3:41
8. "Shadows over Isengard" – 5:20
9. "Thorns of Oblivion" (Aukje Berger) – 2:15

== Personnel ==
- Nimroth – vocals
- Astaroth Daemonum – guitars
- Asmoday – guitars
- Levithmong – drums
- Lord Mystic – bass
