= Jahannam =

Islamic concept of hell and punishment of sinners after death

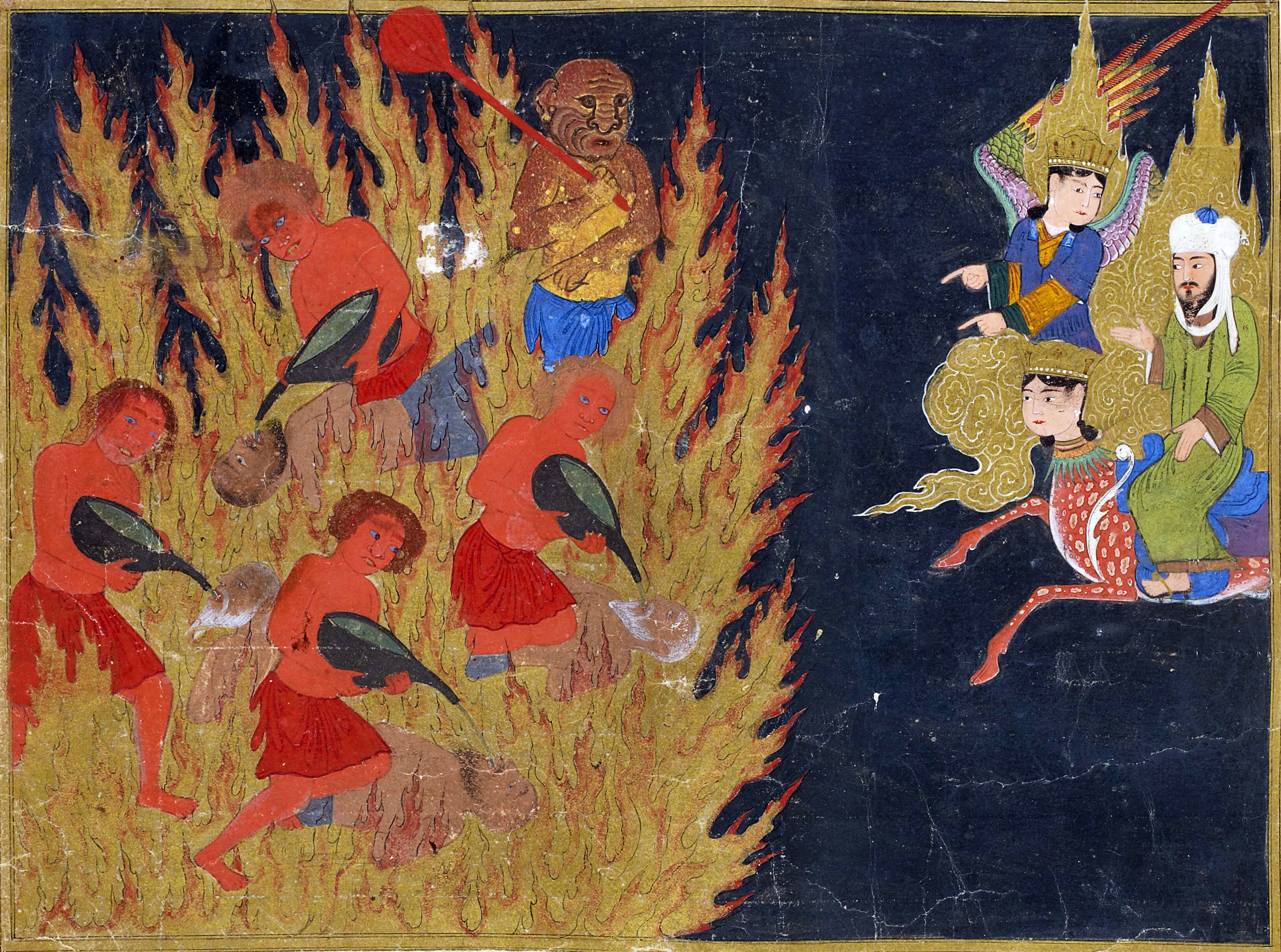
A depiction of Muhammad visiting Jahannam; artwork from Miraj Nameh

In Islam, Jahannam (Arabic: جهنم) is the place of punishment for evildoers in the Akhirah / afterlife, or hell. This notion is an integral part of Islamic theology and has occupied an important place in Muslim belief. The concept is often called by the proper name "Jahannam", but other names refer to hell (Note: Arabic: جهنم, jahannam, including "the fire" النار, al-nar, "blazing fire" جحيم, jaheem, "that which breaks to pieces" حطمة hutamah, "the abyss" هاوية, haawiyah, "the blaze" سعير, sa’eer, "place of burning" سقر Saqar) and these are also often used as the names of different levels of hell. The term "Jahannam" itself is used not only for hell in general but (in one interpretation) for the uppermost layer of hell.

The importance of hell in Islamic doctrine is that it is an essential element of the Day of Judgment, which is one of the six articles of faith (Note: Iman_(Islam)#Six_Articles_of_Faith: Belief in God, the angels, books, prophets, Day of Resurrection, and decree.) "by which the Muslim faith is traditionally defined".

In mainstream Islam, punishment and suffering in hell is physical, psychological, and spiritual, and varies according to the sins of the condemned person. Its pain and horror as described in the Qur'an juxtaposes the pleasure and delights of Jannah (heaven). Muslim scholars disagree over whether hell will last for eternity, (Note: "One should note there was a near consensus among Muslim theologians of the later periods that punishment for Muslim grave sinners would only be temporary; eventually after a purgatory sojourn in hell's top layer they would be admitted into paradise.") or whether God's mercy will lead to its eventual elimination.

The common belief among Muslims holds that Jahannam coexists with the temporal world, just as Jannah does (rather than being created after Judgment Day). Hell is described physically in different ways in different sources within Islamic literature. It is enormous in size, and located below Paradise. It has seven levels, each one more severe than the one above it, but it is also said to be a huge pit the resurrected walk over on the bridge of As-Sirāt. It is said to have mountains, rivers, valleys and "even oceans" filled with disgusting fluids; and also to be able to walk (controlled by reins), and to ask questions, much like a sentient being.

== Etymology, other names, and accounts ==
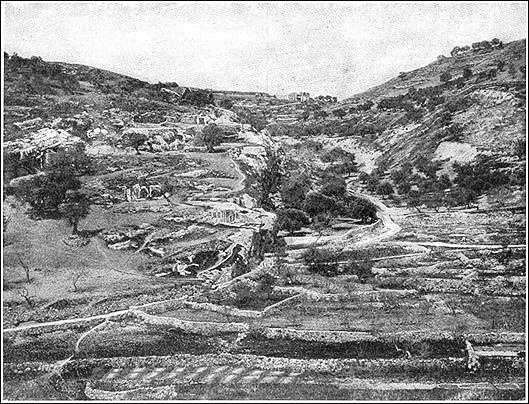
The Valley of Hinnom (or Gehenna), c. 1900. The former site of child-sacrifice and a dumping-ground for the bodies of executed criminals, Jeremiah prophesied that it would become a "valley of slaughter" and burial place; in later literature it thus became identified with a new idea of Hell as a place where the wicked would be punished.

In the Hebrew Bible, Gei-Hinnom or Gei-ben-Hinnom, the "Valley [of the Son] of Hinnom" is an accursed Valley in Jerusalem where child sacrifices took place. In the canonical Gospels, Jesus talks about Gehenna as a place "where the worm never dies and the fire is never quenched" (Mark 9:48). In the apocryphal book of 4 Ezra, written around the 2nd century BCE, Gehinnom appears as a transcendental place of punishment. This change comes to completion in the Babylonian Talmud, written around 500 CE.

It can be thought that the narrative of hell in Islam is largely shaped by the offerings of human sacrifices by passing it over fire or burning it to Molech, which the Tanakh describes as taking place in the Gehenna (Jeremiah 7; 32–35). While the Gehenna gives its name to Hell, the fire used for the offerings turns into Hellfire, and Molech turns into Malik, the guardian of Hell in the Qur'anic narrative. (Q.43:77)

Other names for Jahannam include "the fire" (النار, al-nar), "blazing fire" (جحيم, jaheem), "that which breaks to pieces" (حطمة hutamah), "the abyss" (هاوية, haawiyah), "the blaze" (سعير, sa’eer), and "place of burning" (سقر Saqar), which are also often used as the names of different gates to hell.

There are many traditions on the location of paradise and hell, but not all of them "are easily pictured or indeed mutually reconcilable". For example, some describe hell as in the lowest earth, while one scholar (Al-Majlisī) describes hell as "surrounding" the earth. Islamic scholars speculated on where the entrance to hell might be located. Some thought the sea was the top level, or that the sulphurous well in Hadramawt (in present-day Yemen), allegedly haunted by the souls of the wicked, was the entrance to the underworld. Others considered the entrance in the valley of Hinnom (surrounding the Old City of Jerusalem). In a Persian work, the entry to hell is located in a gorge called Wadi Jahannam (in present-day Afghanistan).

== Sources ==
Different sources used by (or related to) Islam give different descriptions of hell, its torments, location, inhabitants and their sins, etc.

=== Qur'anic descriptions ===
According to Einar Thomassen, much of how Muslims picture and think about Jahannam comes from the Qur'an. He found nearly 500 references to Jahannam in it, using a variety of names. (Note: Scholars differ on the number of references in the Qur'an. A. Jones counts 92 "significant passages" about Hell and 62 about Paradise, while Lange identified about 400 verses "relating, in a meaningful way" to Hell, and about 320 to Paradise. Other scholars claim Paradise gets "significantly more space" in the Qur'an than Hell.) The following is an example of the Qur'anic verses about Hell:

Surely the day of decision is (a day) appointed:
The day on which the trumpet shall be blown so you shall come forth in hosts,
And the heaven shall be opened so that it shall be all openings,
And the mountains shall be moved off so that they shall remain a mere semblance.
Surely hell lies in wait,
A place of resort for the inordinate,
Living therein for ages.
They shall not taste therein cool nor drink
But boiling water and filth,
as a corresponding recompense.
Surely they did not feared the account,
and they rejected Our messages as lies.
And We have recorded everything in a book,
So taste! For We will not increase you in anything except torment. (Q.78:17–30)

Among the different terms and phrases mentioned above that refer to hell in the Qur'an, Fire (nār) is used 125 times, Hell (jahannam) 77 times, and Blazing Fire (jaḥīm) 26 times. One collection of descriptions of hell found in the Qur'an include "rather specific indications of the tortures of the Fire": flames that crackle and roar; fierce, boiling waters, scorching wind, and black smoke, roaring and boiling as if it would burst with rage. Hell is described as being located below Paradise, having seven gates and "for every gate there shall be a specific party" of sinners (Q.15:43–44). The Qur'an also mentions wrongdoers having "degrees (or ranks) according to their deeds", (which some scholars believe refers to the "specific parties" at each of the gates); and of there being "seven heavens ˹in layers˺, and likewise for the earth" (Q.65:12), (though this doesn't indicate that the seven layers of earth are hell). The one mention of levels of hell is that hypocrites will be found in its very bottom.

According to Thomassen, those specifically mentioned in the Qur'an as being punished in hell are "most typically" disbelievers (kāfirūn). These include people who lived during Muhammad's time, the polytheists (mushrikūn), or enemies of Muhammad who worshiped idols (Q.10:24), and the "losers", or enemies of Muhammad who died in war against him (Q.21:70), as well as broad categories of sinners: the apostates (murtaddūn; Q.3:86–87), hypocrites (munafiqūn; Q.4:140), self-content (Q.10:7–8, 17:18),, those who deny the divine origin of the Qur'an (Q.74:16–26), and those who deny the coming of Judgement Day (Q.25:11–14).

In addition are those who have committed serious criminal offenses against other human beings: the murder of a believer (Q.4:93, 3:21), usury (Q.2:275), devouring the property of an orphan (Q.4:10), and slander (Q.104), particularly of a chaste woman (Q.24:23).

Some prominent people mentioned in hadith and the Qur'an as in Hell or destined to go there include Pharaoh (Firʿawn; the pharaoh of The Exodus; Q:10:90-92), the wives of Noah and Lot (Q:66–10), and Abu Lahab and his wife, who were contemporaries and enemies of Muhammad (Q:111).

==== Punishments ====
Hell's inhabitants sigh and wail, get new skins when their old ones completely fall off, drink festering water and though death appears on all sides they cannot die. They are linked together in chains of 70 cubits, wear pitch for clothing and have their faces covered, hear roaring and boiling, and their remorseful admissions of wrongdoing and pleading for forgiveness are in vain. Inmates have chains around their necks (Q.13:5, 36:8, 76:4, etc.), are tethered by hooks of iron (Q.22:21), and are guarded by merciless angels (zabāniyyah; Q.66:6, 96:18).

Its inmates will be thirsty and hungry. Their fluids will include scalding water (Q.6:70), melted brass, and/or be bitterly cold, "unclean, full of pus". Three different unique sources of food are mentioned:

1. Ḍari, a dry desert plant that is full of thorns and neither nourishes nor avails against hunger (Q88:8-9);
2. Ghislin, which is only mentioned once (in Q69:36, which states that it is the only nourishment in hell);
3. Heads of devils hanging from the tree of Zaqqum that "springs out of the bottom of Hell". (Zaqqum are mentioned three or four times: Q.17:60 (as the "cursed tree"), Q.37:62-67, Q.44:43, Q.56:52.)

Psychological torments are humiliation (Q.3:178) and listening to "sighs and sobs". (Q.11:106). There are at least a couple of indications that physical rather than "spiritual or psychological" punishment predominates in hell according to scholars Smith and Haddad. For example, the Quran notes that inmates of hell will be denied the pleasure of "gazing on the face of God", but nowhere does it state "that this loss contributed to the agony" the inmates experience. While the Quran describes the regret the inmates express for the deeds that put them in hell, it is "for the consequences" of the deeds "rather than for the actual commission of them".

=== In Hadith ===
There are "scores" of narrations or "short narratives traced back to the Prophet or his Companions" that "greatly elaborate" on the Quranic image of hell.

==== Organization, size, and guards ====
Similarly to how the Qur'an speaks of the seven gates of hell, "relatively early" narrations attest that hell has seven levels. This interpretation became "widespread" in Islam. The bridge (ṣirāṭ) over hell that all resurrected souls must cross is mentioned in several narrations.

One hadith describes hell as so deep that if a stone were thrown into it, it would fall for 70 years before reaching the bottom. Another states that the breadth of each of Hell's walls is equivalent to a distance covered by a walking journey of 40 years. According to another source (Qurṭubī) it takes "500 years" to get from one of its levels to another.

Hell has seventy thousand valleys, each with "seventy thousand ravines, inhabited by seventy thousand serpents and scorpions".

According to one hadith, out of every one thousand people entering into the afterlife, nine hundred and ninety-nine of them will end up in hell. (According to at least one scholarly salafi interpretation, the hadith expresses the large disparity between the number of saved and damned rather than a specific literal ratio.)

Malik in hadith quotes Muhammad as saying that the "fire of the children of Adam [humans] which they kindle is a seventieth part of the fire of Jahannam." He also describes that fire as "blacker than tar".

In book 87 Hadith 155, "Interpretation of Dreams" of Sahih al-Bukhari, Muhammad is reported to have talked of angels guarding hell, each with "a mace of iron", and describes Jahannam as a place

"built inside like a well and it had side posts like those of a well, and beside each post there was an angel carrying an iron mace. I saw therein many people hanging upside down with iron chains, and I recognized therein some men from the Quraish".

==== Punishments ====
Hadiths introduce punishments, reasons and revelations not mentioned in the Quran. In both Quranic verses and hadiths, "the Fire" is "a gruesome place of punishment that is always contrasted with Jannah, "the Garden" (paradise); its characteristics were usually the opposite of what "the Garden" had." Several hadith describes a part of hell that is extremely cold rather than hot, known as Zamhareer.

Based on hadiths, the sinners are thought to carry signs in accordance with their sins.

==== Inmates and their sins ====
Hadith describe types of sinners populating hell. Seven sins doom a person to hell, according to reports of as-Saheehayn, (i.e. the reports of the two most esteemed Sunni hadith collections: al-Bukhaari and Muslim): "Associating others with Allah (shirk or idolatry); witchcraft; killing a soul whom Allah has forbidden us to kill, consuming orphans' wealth; consuming riba (usury); fleeing from the battlefield; and slandering chaste, innocent women."

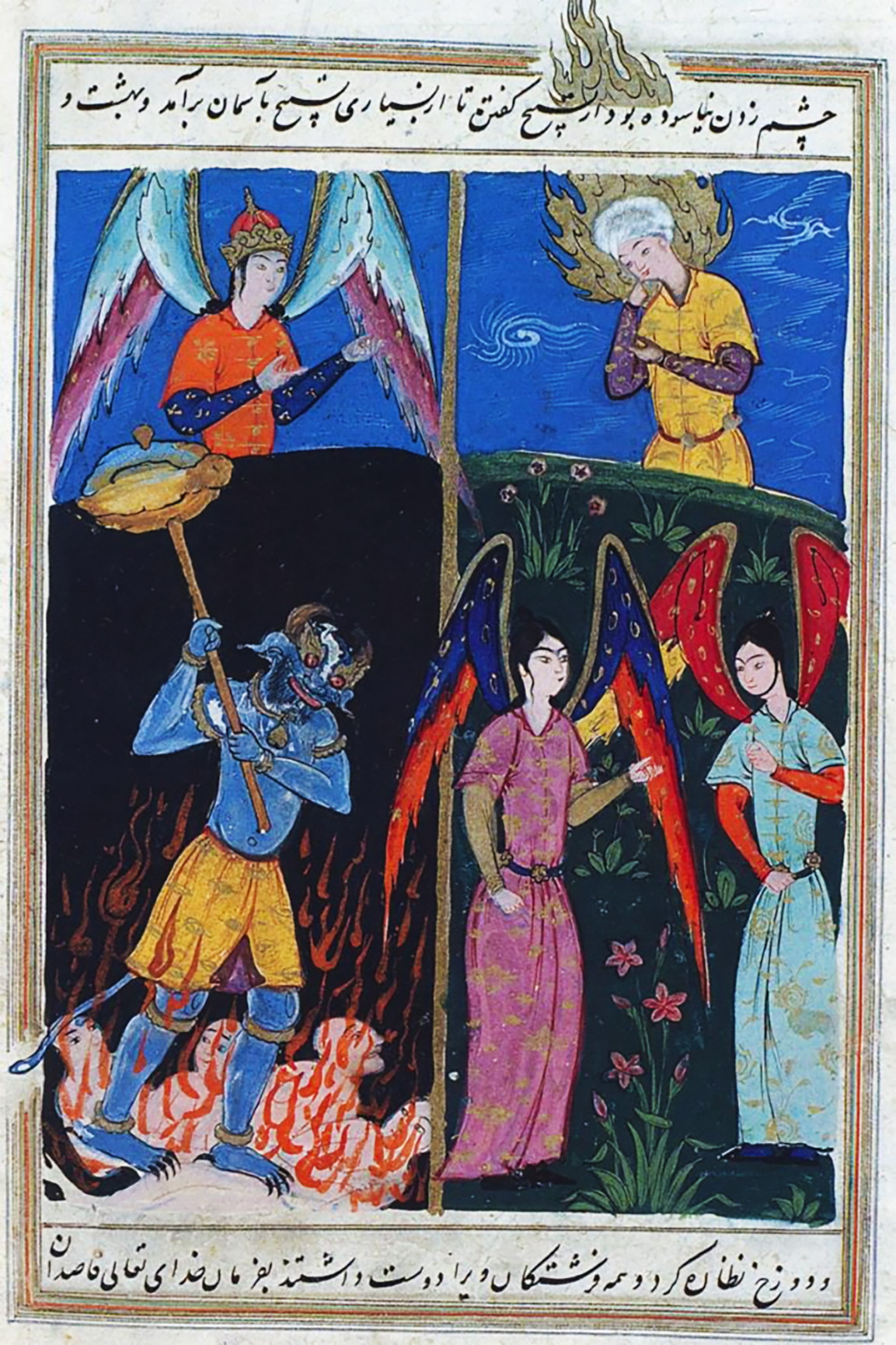
Islamic miniature depicting Idris (top right) taken to the heavens and becoming witness to Paradise and Hell

According to a series of hadith, Muhammad claims the majority of the inhabitants of hell will be women, due to an inclination for gossip, conjecture, ungratefulness of kind treatment from their spouses and idle chatting. (Note: Other hadith include: Narrated `Imran: The Prophet (ﷺ) said, "I looked at Paradise and saw that the majority of its residents were the poor; and I looked at the (Hell) Fire and saw that the majority of its residents were women." (Sahih al-Bukhari 5198: Book 67, Hadith 132. Vol. 7, Book 62, Hadith 126; It was narrated that ‘Abd-Allah ibn ‘Abbas (may Allah be pleased with him) said: The Messenger of Allah (peace and blessings of Allah be upon him) said: "I was shown Hell and I have never seen anything more terrifying than it. And I saw that the majority of its people are women." They said, "Why, O Messenger of Allah?" He said, "Because of their ingratitude (kufr)." It was said, "Are they ungrateful to Allah?" He said, "They are ungrateful to their companions (husbands) and ungrateful for good treatment. If you are kind to one of them for a lifetime then she sees one (undesirable) thing in you, she will say, ‘I have never had anything good from you.’" (Narrated by al-Bukhari, 1052); "The Messenger of Allah (peace and blessings of Allah be upon him) went out to the musalla (prayer place) on the day of Eid al-Adha or Eid al-Fitr. He passed by the women and said, ‘O women! Give charity, for I have seen that you form the majority of the people of Hell.' They asked, ‘Why is that, O Messenger of Allah?' He replied, ‘You curse frequently and are ungrateful to your husbands. I have not seen anyone more deficient in intelligence and religious commitment than you. A cautious sensible man could be led astray by some of you.’ The women asked, ‘O Messenger of Allah, what is deficient in our intelligence and religious commitment?' He said, ‘Is not the testimony of two women equal to the testimony of one man?’ They said, ‘Yes.’ He said, ‘This is the deficiency in her intelligence. Is it not true that a woman can neither pray nor fast during her menses?' The women said, ‘Yes.’ He said, ‘This is the deficiency in her religious commitment.’" (Narrated by al-Bukhaari, 304); It was narrated that Jabir ibn ‘Abd-Allah (may Allah be pleased with him) said: "I attended Eid prayers with the Messenger of Allah (peace and blessings of Allah be upon him). He started with the prayer before the khutbah (sermon), with no adhan (call to prayer) or iqamah (final call to prayer). Then he stood up, leaning on Bilal (may Allah be pleased with him), speaking of fear of Allah (taqwa) and urging us to obey Him. He preached to the people and reminded them. Then he went over to the women and preached to them and reminded them. Then he said, ‘Give in charity, for you are the majority of the fuel of Hell. A woman with dark cheeks stood up in the midst of the women and said, ‘Why is that, O Messenger of Allah?' He said, ‘Because you complain too much and are ungrateful to your husbands.’ Then they started to give their jewelry in charity, throwing their earrings and rings into Bilal's cloak." (Narrated by Muslim, 885)) The Salafi Muslim scholar ʿUmar Sulaymān al-Ashqar (d. 2012) reaffirms the arguments of al-Qurṭubī, that women have an attachment to the here and now, inability to control their passions; but allows that despite this, many women are good and pious and will go to Paradise, and some are even superior to many men in piety. However, other hadith imply that the majority of people in paradise will be women. Since the number of men and women are approximately equal, al-Qurṭubī attempts to reconcile the conflicting hadith by suggesting that many of the women in hell are there only temporarily and will eventually be brought reside in Paradise; thereafter the majority of the people of Paradise would be women. (Note: However, if the number of men and women are approximately equal, both these Hadith could not be true at the same time.)

Other people populating hell mentioned in hadith include the mighty, the proud and the haughty. Einar Thomassen writes that this almost certainly refers to those too proud and haughty to submit to God, i.e. unbelievers.

Sahih Muslim quotes Muhammad as saying that suicides would reside in hell forever. According to the hadith collection Muwaṭṭaʾ of Imam Mālik (711–795), Muhammad said: "Truly a man utters words to which he attaches no importance, and by them he falls into the fire of Jahannam."

Al-Bukhari in book 72:834 added to the list of dwellers in hell: "The people who will receive the severest punishment from Allah will be the picture makers". Use of utensils made of precious metals could also land its users in Jahannam: "A person who drinks from a silver vessel brings the fire of Jahannam into his belly". As could starving a cat to death: "A woman was tortured and was put in Hell because of a cat which she had kept locked till it died of hunger."

One hadith states "... no one will enter Hell in whose heart is an atom's weight of faith." (Note: hadith At-Tirmidhi (1999), Abu Dawood (4091) and Ibn Maajah (59) narrated from ‘Abdullah ibn Mas‘ood that the Prophet (blessings and peace of Allah be upon him) said: "No one will enter Paradise in whose heart is an atom's weight of arrogance and no one will enter Hell in whose heart is an atom's weight of faith.")

=== In Eschatological manuals ===
Diagram of "Plain of Assembly" (Ard al-Hashr) on the Day of Judgment, from an autograph manuscript of Futuhat al-Makkiyya by Sufi mystic and Muslim philosopher Ibn Arabi, c. 1238. Shown are the 'Arsh (Throne of God), pulpits for the righteous (al-Aminun), seven rows of angels, Gabriel (al-Ruh), A'raf (the Barrier), the Pond of Abundance, al-Maqam al-Mahmud (the Praiseworthy Station; where Muhammad will stand to intercede for the faithful), Mizan (the Scale), As-Sirāt (the Bridge), Jahannam (Hell), and Marj al-Jannat (Meadow of Paradise).

"Eschatological manuals" were written after the hadith, they compiled the hadith on hell, and also developed descriptions of Jahannam "in more deliberate ways". While the Quran and hadith tend to describe punishments that nonbelievers are forced to give themselves, the manuals illustrate external and more dramatic punishment, through devils, scorpions, and snakes.

Manuals dedicated solely to the subject of Jahannam include Ibn Abi al-Dunya's Sifat al-nar, and al-Maqdisi's Dhikr al-nar. (Note: hadiths ... were compiled into special eschatological handbooks by authors such as: Saʿīd b. Janāḥ (Shiʿi, fl. early 3rd/9th c.), Ibn Abī l-Dunyā (Sunni, d. 281/894), al-Ghazālī (Sunni, d. 505/1111), al-Qurṭubī (Sunni, d. 671/1272), al-Suyūṭī (Sunni, d. 911/1505), al-Baḥrānī (Shiʿi, d. 1107/1695–6), al-Saffārīnī (Sunni, d. 1189/1774), Ṣiddīq Ḥasan Khān (Sunni, d. 1307/1890); Muḥammad b. Yūsuf Aṭfayyish (Ibāḍī, d. 1332/1917), etc.; There are also "anonymous, popular compilations"; two texts in particular that focus mainly on hell are: Daqāʾiq al-akhbār fī dhikr al-janna wa-l-nār26; Qurrat al-ʿuyūn) Other manuals—such as texts by al-Ghazali and the 12th-century scholar Qadi Ayyad – "dramatise life in the Fire", and present "new punishments, different types of sinners, and the appearance of a multitude of devils," to exhort the faithful to piety. His hell has a structure with a specific place for each type of sinners.

According to Leor Halevi, between the moment of death and the time of their burial ceremony, "the spirit of a deceased Muslim takes a quick journey to Heaven and Hell, where it beholds visions of the bliss and torture awaiting humanity at the end of days".

In The Soul's Journey After Death, Ibn Qayyim Al-Jawziyya, a theologian in the 14th century, writes explicitly of punishments faced by sinners and unbelievers in hell that are directly related to their sinful earthly transgressions.

==== Inmates and their sins ====
Hell is where those "who sleep during prayer (or speak of worldly matters during it), or deny the doctrine of predestinarianism or assert absolute free-will (Qadarites), are punished. Another tradition consigns to the seven different levels of hell, seven different types of "mischievous" Islamic scholars. Government authorities are also threatened with hell, but often in "oblique ways".

===== Other descriptions =====
====== Seven levels ======
Einar Thomassen writes that the seven levels of hell mentioned in hadith "came to be associated" with the seven names used in the Quran to refer to hell, with a category of inmates assigned to each level.

1. Jahannam was reserved for Muslims who had committed grave sins.
2. al-Laza (the blaze)
3. al-Hutama (the consuming fire)
4. al-Sa'ir
5. al-Saqar (the scorching fire)
6. al-jahim (the hot place)
7. al-Hawiya (the abyss) for the hypocrites.

"Various similar models exist with a slightly differing order of names", according to Christian Lange, and he and A. F. Klein give similar lists of levels. Al-Laza and al-Saqar are switched in Lange's list, and there is no accompanying type of unbelievers for each level. In A. F. Klein's list, it is the names of the levels that's not included, and instead of a level for Zoroastrians there is one for "witches and fortunetellers". (Note: Here is another tradition of layers quoted by A. F. Klein: 1. A fire for sinners among the Muslims; 2. Inferno interim for the sinner among the Christians; 3. Provisional destination for sinners among the Jewish; 4. The burning fire for renegades; 5. A place for witches and fortunetellers; 6. Furnace for the disbelievers; 7. A bottomless abyss for hypocrites, like the Pharaoh and people who disbelieves after Isa's table or Muslims who are outwardly believers but inwardly infidels.)

Another description of the layers of hell comes from "models such as that recorded by al-Thalabi (died 427/1035)" corresponding to "the seven earths of medieval Islamic cosmology"; (Note: According to the first part of verse Q.65:12, "It is Allah Who has created seven heavens and of the earth the like thereof (i.e. seven).") the place of hell before the Day of Resurrection. This idea derives from the concept of "seven earths", each beneath the surface of the known world, serving as a sort of underworld, with hell at its bottom. Sources Miguel Asin Palacios and Thomas Patrick Hughes describe these levels as:

1. Adim (surface), inhabited by mankind and jinn.
2. Basit (plain), the prison of winds, from where the winds come from.
3. Thaqil (region of distress), the antechamber of hell, in which dwell men with the mouth of a dog, the ears of a goat and the cloven hoof of an ox.
4. Batih (place of torrents or swamps), a valley through which flows a stream of boiling sulphur to torment the wicked. The dweller in this valley have no eyes and in place of feet, have wings.
5. Hayn (region of adversity), in which serpents of enormous size devour the infidels.
6. Masika/Sijjin (store or dungeon), the office where sins are recorded and where souls are tormented by scorpions of the size of mules. In tafsir, this place is sometimes considered the lowest place instead.
7. As-Saqar (place of burning) and Athara (place of damp and great cold) the home of Iblis, who is chained, his hand fastened one in front of and the other behind him, except when set free by God to chastise his demons.

A large number of hadith about Muhammad's tour of hell during the miʿrāj, describe the various sinners and their torments.

Mansions; A summary of the uppermost level of hell, "reserved for deadly sins" and "subdivided into fourteen mansions, one close above the other, and each is a place of punishment for a different sin", was done by Asin Palacios.

The first mansion is an ocean of fire comprising seventy lesser seas, and on the shore of each sea stands a city of fire. In each city are seventy thousand dwellings; in each dwelling, seventy thousand coffins of fire, the tombs of men and women, who, stung by snakes and scorpions, shriek in anguish. These wretches, the Keeper enlightens Mahomet, were tyrants.

In the second mansion beings with blubber lips writhe under the red-hot forks of demons, while serpents enter their mouths and eat their bodies from within. These are faithless guardians, devoured now by serpents even as they once devoured the inheritances committed to their trust. Lower down usurers stagger about, weighed down by the reptiles in their bellies. Further, shameless women hang by the hair that they had exposed to the gaze of man. Still further down liars and slanderers hang by their tongues from red-hot hooks lacerating their faces with nails of copper. Those who neglected the rites of prayer and ablution are now monsters with the head of dogs and the bodies of swine and are the food of serpents. In the next mansion drunkards suffer the torture of raging thirst, which demons affect to quench with cups of a liquid fire that burns their entrails. Still lower, hired mourners and professional women singers hang head downwards and howl with pain as devils cut their tongues with burning shears. Adulterers are punished in a cone-shaped furnace ... and their shrieks are drowned by the curses of their fellow damned at the stench of their putrid flesh. In the next mansion unfaithful wives hang by their breasts, their hands tied to their necks. Undutiful children are tortured in a fire by fiends with red-hot forks. Lower down, shackled in collars of fire, are those who failed to keep their word. Murderers are being knifed by demons in endless expiation of their crime. Lastly, in the fourteenth and lowest mansion of the first storey, are being crucified on burning pillars those who failed to keep the rule of prayer; as the flames devour them, their flesh is seen gradually to peel off their bones.

Three Valleys; The three valleys in hell described in the Quran on separate occasions are Ghayy, Wayl, and Saqar. Of these valleys, Ghayy is for those who postpone their prayers to the time of the next prayer, Wayl is for worshippers who neglect their prayers, and Saqar (also described as one of the seven levels above) is for those who did not pray, did not feed the poor, waded in vain dispute with vain talkers, and denied the Day of Judgement until they died.

Pit; In addition to having levels, an important feature of Judgement Day is that hell is a huge pit over which the bridge of As-Sirāt crosses, and from which sinners fall making their arrival in hell (see "Eschatological manuals" above) Christian Lange writes "it made sense to picture [hell] as a vast subterranean funnel, spanned by the Bridge, which the resurrected pass on their way to paradise, with a brim (shafīr) and concentric circles leading down into a central pit at the bottom (qaʿr)."

But along with a pit and levels, hell also has mountains, rivers, valleys and "even oceans" filled with "fire, blood, and pus".

Sentience; Some scholars, like al-Ghazali and the thirteenth-century Muslim scholar Al-Qurtubi, describe hell as a gigantic sentient being, rather than a place. In Paradise and Hell-fire in Imam al Qurtubi, Qurtubi writes quoting a sahih Muslim hadith, (Note: Numerous sahih hadith mention hell having 70,000 halters, bridles, or reins each being dragged by 70,000 angels on Judgement Day.) "On the Day of Judgment, hell will be brought with seventy thousand reins. A single rein will be held by seventy thousand angels ...". Based on verse 67:7 and verse 50:30, Jahannam inhales and has "breaths". Islamicity notes "the animalistic nature" of "The Fire" in Quranic verse 25:12: "When the Hellfire sees them from a distant place, they will hear its fury and roaring". According to verse 50:30, God will ask Jahannam if it is full and it will answer: "Are there any more (to come)?"

Inmates; Thomassen writes that in Islamic thought, there was "a certain amount of tension" between the two "distinct functions" of hell: to punish disbelievers and to punish anyone who committed serious sins—both of which could draw support from Quranic verses and hadith. Factors involved in who will be consigned to hell are:

- Unforgiveableness of unbelief. According to Smith and Haddad, perhaps "almost the only point on which Muslim thinkers completely agreed" was that it was "certain that the one unpardonable sin, that for which the pain of the Fire is assured, is refusal to testify to the tawẖīd (the indivisible oneness) of God, called either kufr (unbelief) or shirk (worshiping other besides the one God).
- God's mercy. "The tendency has been to suggest that even grave sinners may hope for God’s mercy, as long as they have professed belief", based on two types of Quranic verses:
  - "Indeed, Allah does not forgive associating others with Him ˹in worship˺ but forgives anything else of whoever He wills ..." (Q.4:48),
  - "Whoever commits evil or wrongs themselves then seeks Allah's forgiveness will certainly find Allah All-Forgiving, Most Merciful" (Q.4:110);
  - "So whoever does an atom's weight of good will see it" (Q.99:7–8) (and would be recompensed).
- That all human beings "are responsible" for their actions in this world, and all (even Muslims) face a "real possibility" of going to hell, (Q.19:71). This theme "has continued to play an important role throughout the history of Islam";
- God's freedom to send to Paradise or hell, whoever he chooses,
  - "We do certainly know best those who deserve most to be burned therein" (Q.19:70);
  - "Indeed, Allah does not forgive associating others with Him ˹in worship˺ but forgives anything else of whoever He wills" (Q.4:48). (Note: "The Ash'arites were concerned with affirming the omnipotence of God even to the extent that, 'it seemed theoretically (ʿaklān) possible to some dogmatists that the Faithful should dwell in Hell for ever on account of their sins, and that the infidels should dwell in Paradise for ever on account of divine forgiveness")
- What sins are considered grave enough to merit damnation ("There is no fixed canon of mortal sins in Islamic theology").
- Although grave sins such as usury or murder of another Muslim are not unpardonable in themselves, they are sufficiently serious that those who commit them cease to be Muslims and become guilty of unbelief, a sin that is unpardonable, (this being a "famous" issue in the theological debates of early Islam between Khawarij, Murji'a, Mutazila, Ash'ari).

"Ultimately" the view of the Ash'arite school prevailed in "classical Islamic theology": God was free to judge as he chose, but on the other hand all believers can feel assured of salvation. (Note: Cf. e.g. For more detailed accounts of the positions of the various schools and individual theologians see van Ess 1991–97, 4:1059: index, s.vv. "Hölle," "Höllenstrafe.") For a survey of more modern Muslim views on hell, see Smith & Haddad, Islamic Understanding, 1981: pp.134–143; quoted in Thomassen, "Islamic Hell", Numen, 56, 2009: p.410)

This left the issue of whether and how to punish sinful Muslims (to ensure "moral and religious discipline" and responsibility for individual actions). One solution was to reserve for Muslims the highest level of hell with the most lenient punishments, but a "more common" solution was to make the stay of Muslims in hell temporary.

The issue of whether People of the Book qualify as believers or are simply unbelievers destined for hell is also discussed. In two places in the Quran, almost identical verses seem to indicate they are saved:

- "Surely those who believe, and those who are Jews, and the Christians, and the Sabians, whoever believes in Allah and the Last Day and does good, they shall have their reward from their Lord, and there is no fear for them, nor shall they grieve" (Q.2:62; cf. 5:69)

But there "exists a strong exegetical tradition" that claims these verses were abrogated by a later verse indicating a much less pleasant hereafter:

- "... whoever desires a religion other than Islam, it shall not be accepted from him, and in the hereafter he shall be one of the losers." (Q.3:85)

Jinn, devils, and angels: according to Islam, the jinn are obligated to follow the Islamic law (sharīʿa). The pairing of humans and jinn as subjects of God's judgement is settled in the Quranic phrase "al-ins wa-l-jinn" ("the humans and the jinn"). Both are created to "serve" ('abada) God (51:56), both are capable of righteous and evil deeds (11:119). The Quran confirms that hell will be populated with both sinful humans and sinful jinn.

The fate of Satan is less clear. Some say he and his offspring are already chained in hell (Sijjin), others say he and his hosts will be the first to enter hell, while yet others say, the devils will all perish at Judgment Day. Since Satan and the devils are created from fire, some scholars suggest that they will suffer from the intense cold of Zamhareer. A popular opinion among Shias is that the Mahdi will kill Iblis. In some manuals of Islamic eschatology, the angels of divine justice will seize and kill Iblis, instead. Most agree that the devils are damned to hell, but the Murji'ah argue that even Satan might be restored to his former glory.

Angels punish the sinners and guard the entrances to hell. These angels were created from the fires of hell, and therefore, do not suffer wherein. They are described as subordinates of God and thus the punishment they inflict is ultimately just.

== Timeline ==
Quranic verses suggest that Judgment Day, paradise, and hell are not "conceived to lie" off in some indefinite future, but "immediately ahead; it is now, or almost there already".

It is also a common belief among Muslims that hell, like paradise, "coexists in time" with the temporal world, having already been created. The basis of this belief was the Quranic statement "hell has been prepared (uʿiddat) for the unbelievers" (Q.2:24), and also hadith reporting that Muhammad had seen the punishment of sinners in hell during his miraculous miraj journey on a winged creature.

=== Eternal or temporary ===
Some Muslims believe that hell is temporary for Muslims but not for others. (Note: "It may be said that the only sin that all theologians have regarded as definitely unpardonable and assuredly leading to hell, is disbelief, either in the form of kufr (the stubborn refusal to believe) or of shirk (the worship of something other than the one God)—in other words, idolatry. Although there exists a prophetic tradition listing seven deadly sins—idolatry, magic, murder, robbing orphans, usury, apostasy, and the slandering of faithful women—the tendency has been to suggest that even grave sinners may hope for God’s mercy, as long as they have professed belief and are Muslims.) (Note: "One should note there was a near consensus among Muslim theologians of the later periods that punishment for Muslim grave sinners would only be temporary; eventually after a purgatory sojourn in hell's top layer they would be admitted into paradise." Prior to that, theologians of the Kharijite and Mu'tazilite schools insisted that the "sinful" and "unrepentant" should be punished even if they were believers, but this position has been "lastingly defeated and erased" by mainstream Islam.) This combines in Jahannam two concepts: an eternal hell, and a place (an "outer level" of hell was sometimes called al-barrāniyya), resembling the Christian Catholic idea of purgatory. (Note: "As for those who disbelieve, for them is the fire of Hell; it does not destroy them so that they die, nor is its torment lightened for them. Thus We punish every disbeliever." [Q.35:36] Sunnah online quotes a hadith describing "As for the people of Hell, they are its inhabitants, and they neither live therein nor die. But there are people who will enter Hell because of their sins – or mistakes – so Allah will cause them to die once, then when they become like coal, He will give permission for intercession (for them). They will be brought group by group to the rivers of Paradise. Then it will be said, 'O people of Paradise! Pour water on them.' Then they will grow like seeds (i.e., the seeds of herbs and aromatic plants, or it was said, small plants that grow in between grasses, or it may mean wheat).' ")

Several verses in the Quran mention the eternal nature of hell or both paradise and hell, (Note: "Never shall they issue from the Fire." (Q.2:167 Arberry trans.); "Their wish will be to get out of the Fire, but never will they get out therefrom: their penalty will be one that endures." (Q.5:36–37); "taste ye the Penalty of Eternity for your (evil) deeds!" (Q.32:14); "the Fire: therein will be for them the Eternal Home: a (fit) requital, for that they were wont to reject Our Signs." (Q.41:28)) or that the damned will linger in hell for ages. Two verses in the Quran (6:128 and 11:107) emphasize that consignment to hell is horrible and eternal—but include the caveat "except as God (or your Lord) wills it", which some scholars considered an exemption from the eternity of hell, which suggests to some that Jahannam will be destroyed some day, so that its inhabitants may either be rehabilitated or cease to exist. The concept of hell's annihilation is referred to as fanāʾ al-nār. Thomassen writes that "several types of concerns" weigh "against the idea of an eternal hell in Islamic thought": belief in the mercy of God; resistance to the idea that Muslims—even great sinners—would "end up together with the disbelievers in the hereafter"; and resistance to the idea that "something other than God himself might have eternal existence".

The Ulama (Islamic scholars) disagree on this issue. According to Christian Lange, "the majority" of theologians agreed that hell like Paradise "was eternal". In modern times Shia cleric Sayyid Mujtaba Musavi Lari argues against the idea that hell will not last for eternity.

For Muʿtazilis the eternity of paradise and hell posed a major problem, since they regard God as the only eternal entity. (Note: "For the debates on the eternality of hell, see": e.g.) Egyptian Hanafi author al-Tahawi writes that God punishes sinners in proportions to their offense in accordance with his justice, afterwards release them in accordance with his mercy. Ibn Taymiyya (d.728/1328) also argued for a limited abode in hell, based on the Quran and God's attribute of mercy (in more recent times fanāʾ al-nār has been supported by Rashīd Riḍā (d. 1936), İzmirli Ismail Hakkı (d. 1946) Yūsuf al-Qarādāwī (d. 2022)).

How optimistic Muslims were about whether they and the rest of humanity would avoid hell varied considerably. The idea of the "demise of hell" (ibn Taymiyya, Yemenite ibn al-Wazir (d. 840/1436)) meant (or at least meant to these theologians) that God would provide for "universal salvation even for non-Muslims". At the other end of the theological "spectrum" were fearful "renunciants" such as al-Hasan al-Basri. Though Hasan was so faithful he was considered a "pious exemplar" of his age, he still felt great anxiety as to whether he would be among those fortunate enough to spend 1,000 years suffering in hell before being released to Jannah.

== Doctrines and beliefs ==
=== Sufism ===
Many prominent Sufis preached "the centrality of the love of God", from which focus on eternal reward was a "distraction". Rabi'a al-'Adawiyya aka Rabia of Basra (died 801), is said to have proclaimed to passersby that she does not worship out of fear of hell or desire of paradise, but out of love.

Similarly, Bāyazīd Basṭāmī (d. 234/848) proclaimed the fire of "God's love" burns a thousand times more intensely than hellfire.

Others did not take literally the Quran's verses on paradise and hell as physical places where believers are rewarded with pleasure and sinners tortured with pain. According to ibn ʿArabī, Hell and Paradise are psychological states of the soul manifested after its separation from the body. He believed hell and paradise are only the distance or closeness from God, respectively, in the mind of resurrectant. The torments of hell wrong-doers endure are actually their conception of their distance from God, created by their sinful indulgence in their earthly desires and the illusion of things other than God as existent. But distance from God is also only illusory, because everything other than God is an illusion, since "everything is a form of the degrees of the Divine Existence". So in fact, Hell and Paradise are just as real as the current world, which is unreal in comparison to God.

Many ideas attributed Ibn Arabi have been rejected by Wahhabis. For example, Ahmad ibn Idris debated in detail with the ex-Wahhabi Nasir al-Kubaybi about sins committed by him and his students, and deviations that are said to have been propagated by Ibn Arabi. For Ahmad ibn Idris, Nasir al-Kubaybi explained that no human except the Prophet is protected from sins, and he also said that individuals' actions are to be judged in line with Qur'an and Sunnah only, and regarding Ibn Arabi, he fiercely defended the stance that Ibn Arabi was a Muslim of sound faith and whatever contradicted this was in fact not from him.

Many other prominent Sufis too had more conventional attitudes, such as al-Ghazali, who warned Muslims,

"your coming unto it (hellfire) is certain, while your salvation therefrom is no more than conjecture. ... fill up your heart therefore with a dread of that destination."

Moreover, Abd Al-Aziz Al-Dabbagh gave precise details of the locations of the two abodes in terms of Islamic Cosmology, while noting that the ignorance of existence of the two abodes at present alone suffices to lead someone to hell, and Shaykh Rifai attributed its bottom level to oppressors. Abdulqadir Jilani said that through the blessings of his students' association with him none of them were going to enter hell, Abu Madyan Al-Ghawth in Hikam likened working for other than God to the past behavior of hell's inhabitants.

=== Non-Sunni schools ===
==== Twelver Shia ====
According to Islamic scholars (such as Ayatullah Mahdi Hadavi Tehrani and Sayyid Mujtaba Musavi Lari) works on a major Shia Islam website, al-Islam.org, some unbelievers go to hell, but unbelievers known as ‘Jahil-e-Qasir’ (lit. ‘inculpable ignorant’), "will attain salvation if they are truthful to their own religion" because the message of Islam either didn't reach them, or reached them in an incorrect form. For those "who have committed a certain number of lesser sins and offences, they shall either spend an appropriate amount of time in hellfire or receive the kindness and forgiveness of God". Al-Islam also states: "According to the Qur`an and ahadith, heaven and hell exist at present. However, they will become fully apparent and represented only in the Hereafter ...".

==== Isma'ili ====
Isma'ili authors (such as Abu Yaqub al-Sijistānī) believe resurrection, heaven and hell do not involve physical bodies, but what is spiritual. Suffering of hell came from failure to be enlightened by the teachings of the Isma'ili Imam, but such suffering does not require resurrection. According to one source, they do not believe hell will last for eternity, based on their interpretation of Quranic verse 11:106. Instead, they believe hell to be a possible station of the soul's journey to its perfection in afterlife.

==== Ibadis ====
According to Interfaith Alliance and Islamic studies professor Gavin Picken, Ibadis believe non-Ibadis and Ibadis who committed major sins without repenting will remain in hell forever.

==== Ahmadiyya ====
According to the Ahmadiyya movement (by way of their official website), the places of Paradise and Hell are actually images of man's own spiritual life during lifetime, hell is a manifestation of his sins. They believe "there are numerous passages in the Holy Quran showing that those in hell shall ultimately be taken out". Whereas the word "abad" used in the Quran has been translated as "eternity", it should be translated as "a long time", and the actual purpose of suffering in hell should not be thought of as punishment of sinners, but the purging of "the evil effects of their deeds done in this life" for the sinners "spiritual advancement". This is because in the afterlife, Muslims and non-Muslims, even those "who never did any good deeds", will eventually be taken out of hell.

=== Modernism, postmodernism ===
According to Smith and Haddad, "The great majority of contemporary Muslim writers, ... choose not to discuss the afterlife at all". Islamic Modernists, according to Smith and Haddad, express a "kind of embarrassment with the elaborate traditional detail concerning life in the grave and in the abodes of recompense, called into question by modern rationalists". Consequently, most of "modern Muslim Theologians" either "silence the issue" or reaffirm "the traditional position that the reality of the afterlife must not be denied but that its exact nature remains unfathomable".

The beliefs of Pakistani modernist Muhammad Iqbal (died 1938), were similar to the Sufi "spiritual and internalized interpretations of hell" of ibn ʿArabī, and Rumi, seeing paradise and hell "primarily as metaphors for inner psychic" developments. Thus hell is actually a state of realization of one's failures as a human being", and not a supernatural subterranean realm. Egyptian modernist Muhammad ʿAbduh, thought it was sufficient to believe in the existence of an afterlife with rewards and punishment to be a true believer, even if you ignored "clear" (ẓāhir) hadith about hell.

Some postmodernists have found at least one sahih (authentic) hadith on hell unacceptable—the tradition of Muhammad stating, "most people in hell are women" has been explained as an attempt to "legitimate social control over women" (Smith and Haddad), or perpetuate "the moral, social, political, sectarian hierarchies" of medieval Islam (Lange).

== Doubts and criticisms ==
In modern times a number of questions have been raised and replies made, about how just or suited to divinity the Islamic doctrine of hell, or at least the traditional doctrine, is. Among them are:

- the seeming relish with which the Quran and/or commentators detail "the torture and the sufferings awaiting the sinners", the "boiling water, running sores, peeling skin, burning flesh, dissolving bowels, and crushing of skulls with iron maces"; what Christian Lange describes as indulging in "phantasies of violence and pain" which are "often shockingly violent, and frequently obscene"; Thomassen thinks shows an "almost sadistic delight"; and ibn Warraq finds out of character for a creator who begins all but two of the chapters of His holy book (Note: (the fatihah and sura 9)) with the statement that God is merciful and compassionate.

Replies include that hell serves as deterrence. Fear of hell's horror will strengthen the will of the morally weak to obey God and to turn away from the temptations of sinful pleasure and the pollution of unbelief; that the wholesome fear of God's "just punishments ... grounded in religious faith" is very different than "coercion and force" (Mujtaba Musavi Lari). God created Paradise and Hell because "the people should worship their Lord, desiring His reward and fearing of His torment." God being "the Wisest of the judges", knows that his creations "love security and benefits and hate misery and torture" (Islamweb).

- that the gruesome punishments of hell last for eternity, while the sins were committed over (some part) of a lifetime of a few decades. Antony Flew wonders if the "infinite punishment" of hell is out of proportion to the "finite offenses" of the damned.

Shia cleric Mujtaba Musavi Lari acknowledges that this "presents a problem for many people", and offers a number of arguments: He notes that God's "essence is utterly pure of any trace of injustice", and reminds readers that "utter justice prevails in God's judging of men", with even small amounts of good being weighed in the balance; he quotes Imam Ja'far al-Sadiq that eternal punishment is appropriate because of the intention of the sinners was "to persist in sin" as long as they lived and if they had been "made immortal in this world" they would have kept on sinning indefinitely; and furthermore their sins may have long lasting consequences, and/or lead other humans "to the wrong path", spreading sin all over.

- the standard doctrine that the eternal reward for non-believers is hell, "irrespective of who they were and what they did." E. Thomassen writes that while the traditional idea that hell is punishment for unbelievers and Paradise the reward for Muslims plays "an important role in the construction and maintenance" of Muslim religious identity, it has "become increasingly challenged" by the "common humanitarian values" of global society. (One ex-Muslim – "Abu Lahab"—writing in The Guardian Editor press review, felt he was "forced out of Islam" because he could not accept the idea of eternal punishment of torture for non-Muslims. "I found it hard to understand why every non-believer would end up" in hell, no matter how kind and good they may have been.)

Conservative scholars (Muhammad Saalih Al-Munajjid and his subordinates) emphasize Islamic doctrine in the judging of whether someone goes to Paradise or Hell: "the point is not whether their morals are good, rather the point is whether they submit to Allaah ... and obey his commands." In answering an audience question, well-known preacher Zakir Naik compares the consigning to hell of otherwise righteous non-Muslims (like Mother Teresa), to giving a failing grade/mark to a student who scores 99 out of 100 in five of the six subjects they must pass, but fails one subject (comparing this to failing iman, i.e. Islamic faith). Jonathan Brown concludes an examination of the matter by saying "anxiety over the fate" of human beings after death (whether Muslims or non-Muslims) "is best assuaged by trusting in God's total justice and immense mercy". Finally, some, (such as Gabriel Said Reynolds) simply deny the traditional doctrine, arguing God will "find goodness, even holiness, in those who do not practice Islam.".
Abu Hamid al-Ghazali categorized non-Muslims into three categories:

1. People who never heard of the message, who live in far away lands, such as the Byzantines ("Romans"). These will be forgiven.
2. People who were exposed to a distorted understanding of Islam and have no recourse to correct that information. These too will be forgiven.
3. People who heard of Islam because they live in neighboring lands and mix with Muslims. These have no hope of salvation.

He also wrote about non-Muslims who have heard a distorted message: "The name of Muhammad has indeed reached their ears, but they do not know his true description and his character. Instead, they heard from the time they were young that a deceitful liar named Muhammad claimed to be a prophet. As far as I am concerned, such people are [excused] like those who the call of Islam has not reached, for while they have heard of the Prophet's name, they heard the opposite of his true qualities. And hearing such things would never arouse one's desire to find out who he was."

Islamic scholars disagree on duration of Hell's punishment. The common view holds that Hell will continue to exist for an eternity with some inhabitants, while others hold that Hell exists to purify rather than inflict pain, and may even cease to exist after a while.

- that God literally "creates beings to fill hell with", punishing his creatures for actions beyond their power to control, as reflected in verses such as
  - "If We had so willed, We could have given every soul its guidance, but now My Word is realized—'I shall fill Hell with jinn and men together.'" (Q.32.32.)
  - "God misleads whom He will and whom He will He guides." (Q.14:4)

and the logical conclusion of a world where God is omnipotent, controlling even the behavior of human beings. In the words of verse Q.9:51,
- "By no means can anything befall us [his creatures] but what God has destined for us."
Michael Cook notes that "compassion is conspicuously absent" in these verses, and philosopher, political economist John Stuart Mill condemns the combination of predestination and hell as a "dreadful idealization of wickedness."

In reply the Hanafi fiqh fatwa site IslamQA states that predestination is one of those issues which God urges Muslims to "abstain from" speaking about "as much as possible". "We must believe in predestination, yet we cannot assume that our actions are entirely bound by it." Though "everyone's abode (for Jannat or Jahannam [i.e. for Paradise or Hell]) has been written", because God "knows everything we have done", are currently doing, or will do in the future, nonetheless God has still "given us the choice in everything" we do.
Based on Sunni traditions, God wrote everything that will happen (in all of his creation) on a tablet before creating the world. Thus it is asked: how can humans be punished for what God has determined they do. In this tradition, in Ashari thought, God created good and evil deeds, which humans decide upon—humans have their own possibility to choose, but God retains sovereignty of all possibilities. This still leaves the question of why God set out those people's lives (or the negative choice of deeds) which result in Hell, and why God made it possible to become evil. In Islamic thought, evil is considered to be movement away from good, and God created this possibility so that humans are able to recognize good. (In contrast, angels are unable to move away from good, therefore angels generally rank lower than humans as they have reached heaven because they lack the ability to perceive the world as humans do.)

== Comparison with other religions ==
=== Christianity ===
Some of the Quranic parables describing the sufferings in hell resemble those of the Christian New Testament.

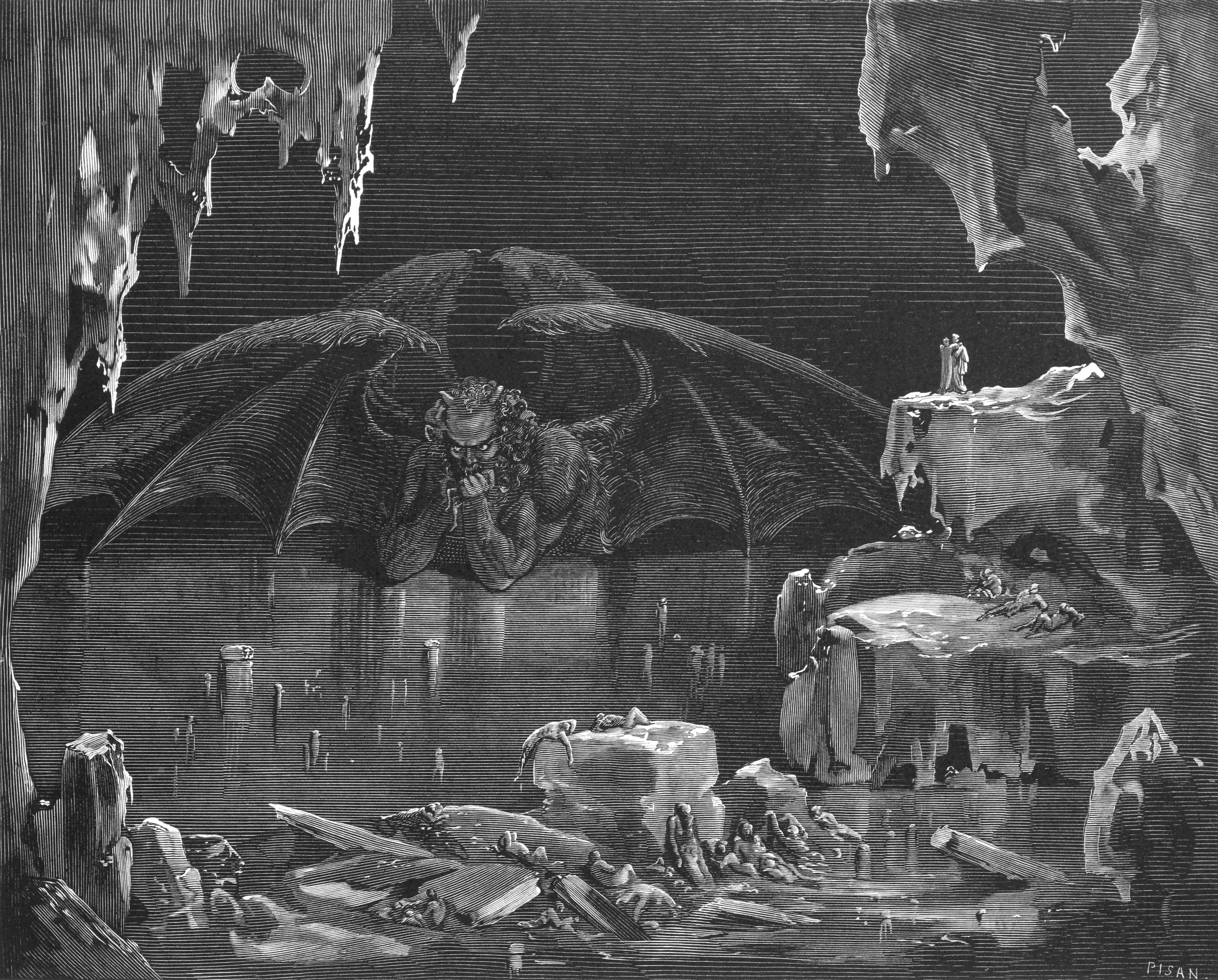
Satan is trapped in the frozen central zone in the Ninth Circle of Hell, Inferno, Canto 34.

Just as hell is often depicted as the seat of the devil in Christian culture (though not in the Bible itself), (Note: The Christian Bible itself makes no mention of hell being the home of the devil.) some Islamic scholars also describe it that way.

Al-Tha'alibis (961–1038) in his Qisas Al-Anbiya and Al-Suyutis Al-Hay'a as-samya fi l-hay'a as-sunmya describes Iblis as chained to the bottom of hell, commanding his hosts of demons from there. Also in the poetry of Al-Ma'arri, Iblis is the king of Jahannam. These depictions of Iblis as lord of hell simultaneously chained at its very bottom influenced Dante's representation of Lucifer and gave rise to the Christian depiction of hell as the seat of the devil. Inferno by Dante also shares the Islamic idea of dividing hell into multiple "circles". According to the Divine Comedy, each layer corresponding to another sin, with Satan inside a frozen area at the very bottom. As with Christian popular understanding of hell, ʿKitāb al-ʿAẓama, a popular cultural work, describes hell as inhabited not only by the Zabaniyya (guarding angels), but also by devils (shayatin), dwelling in the fourth layer of hell and rising up from coffins to torture the sinners.

As evident from late Ottoman poetry, the notion of Iblis ruling hell remained in Islamic popular tradition until modern times. In one of Ğabdulla Tuqay's works, Iblis' current abode in hell is compared to working in factories during Industrial Revolution. When Iblis gets weary about Hell, he remembers his time in Heaven. According to Salafi shaikh Osama al-Qusi, Iblis scolds the inhabitants of hell from a minbar, how they could have listened to him, knowing it is his nature to deceive them.

Notably, Iblis' temporary rule over Jahannam depends always on God's power and hell is still a form of punishment for Iblis himself. ("We have appointed only ˹stern˺ angels as wardens of the Fire." according to Q.74:31) Einar Thomassen points out that Iblis is chained to the floor of hell as punishment, whereas Malik is head of the 19 angels who guard hell, indicating it is the angels who are in charge and not the devils.

==== Christian Liberalism ====
In modern times some Christians and Christian denominations (such as Universalism) have rejected the concept of hell as a place of suffering and torment for sinners on the grounds that it is incompatible with a loving God. (Note: At least in one Christian majority country – the US. "Over the last 20 years, the number of Americans who believe in the fiery down under has dropped from 71 percent to 58 percent. ... Underlying these statistics is a conundrum that continues to tug at the conscience of some Christians, who find it difficult to reconcile the existence of a just, loving God with a doctrine that dooms billions of people to eternal punishment.") There are also symbolic and more merciful interpretations of hell among Muslims. Muslims Mouhanad Khorchide and Faheem Younus write that since the Quran states that God has "prescribed to himself mercy", and "... for him whose scales (of good deeds) are light. Hell will be his mother," suffering in Jahannam is not a product of vengeance and punishment, but a temporary phenomenon as the sinner is "transformed" in the process of confronting the truth about themselves. The idea of annihilation of hell was already introduced earlier by traditionalistic scholars, such as Ibn Taimiyya. However, Christian evangelist Phil Parshall, who spent several decades observing and writing about Muslims in Asia, wrote that he "never met a Muslim who has attempted to undercut the bluntness and severity of their doctrine of hell."

=== Judeo-Islamic sources ===
Arabic texts written by Jews in Judeo-Arabic script (particularly those which are identified with the Isra'iliyyat genre in the study of hadith) also feature descriptions of Jahannam (or Jahannahum). These seem to have been strongly influenced by the Islamic environment in which they were composed, and may be considered as holding many of the same concepts as those today identified with Islamic eschatology. A Judeo-Arabic version of a popular narrative known as The Story of the Skull (whose earliest version is attributed to Ka'ab al-Ahbar) offers a detailed picture of the concept of Jahannam. Here, Malak al-Mawt (the Angel of Death) and a number of sixty angels seize the soul of the dead and begin torturing him with fire and iron hooks. Two black angels named Nākir and Nakīr (identified with Munkar and Nakir in Islamic eschatology) strike the dead with a whip of fire and take him to the lowest level of Jahannam. Then, they order the Earth to swallow and crush the dead inside its womb, saying: "Seize him and take revenge, because he has stolen Allāh's wealth and worshipped others than Him". Following this, the dead is brought before the dais of God where a herald calls for throwing the dead into Jahannam. There he is put in shackles sixty cubits long and into a leather sackcloth full of snakes and scorpions.

The Judeo-Arabic legend in question explains that the dead is set free from the painful perogatory after twenty-four years. In a final quote alluding to Isaiah 58.8, the narrative states that "nothing will help Man on the last day except good and loving actions, deeds of giving charity to widows, orphans, the poor and the unfortunate."

Some Jewish sources such as Jerahmeel provide descriptive detail of hell-like places, divided into multiple levels; usually Sheol, which is translated as a grave or pit, is the place where humans descend upon death.

=== Zoroastrianism ===
The religion of Zoroastrianism resembles Islam in not only having a hell and a Judgement Day, but also a bridge over hell (As-Sirāt in Islam, Chinvat Bridge in Zorastrianism) that all resurrected souls will pass over, and that those destined for hell will fall off of to land in hell.

=== Hinduism ===
In terms of a finite hell, as asserted by some Sufi thinkers, conceived as a circulation of beginning and reset, the cosmology resembles the Hindu notion of an eternal cosmic process of generation, decay, and destruction.

A detailed description of the journey of the soul and the punishments of Naraka are detailed in the Garuda Purana.

=== Buddhism ===
Some descriptions of Jahannam resemble Buddhist descriptions of Naraka from Mahayana sutras in regard of destroying inhabitants of hell physically, while their consciousness still remains and after the body is destroyed, it will regenerate again, thus the punishment will repeat. However, according to Buddhist belief, beings in hell have a limited lifespan, as with all beings trapped in the cycle of Samsara; they will ultimately exhaust their bad karma, experience death, and be reborn in a higher realm.

== See also ==
- Barzakh
- Duzakh
- Salvation
