= Infernal =

Infernal may refer to:

- Pertaining to Hell

== Literature ==
- Infernal (novel), a 2005 novel by F. Paul Wilson
- The Infernal, a 1997 novel by Kim Wilkins

== Music ==
- Infernal (Danish band), a dance-pop group
- Infernal (Swedish band), a black metal band
- Infernal (Edge of Sanity album), 1997
- Infernal (Nando Reis album) or the title song, 2001
- Infernal (Phideaux album), 2018

== Video games ==
- Infernal (video game), a 2007 third-person shooter video game

== See also ==
- Inferno (disambiguation)
- Dictionnaire Infernal, a 19th-century compendium of demonology
- The infernal names, as compiled by Anton LaVey
