= Cirith Gorgor =

Dutch black metal band

- Also known as: Dark Sorceress
- Origin: Netherlands
- Genres: Black metal
- Years active: 1993–present
- Members: Marchosias; Waldtyr; Levithmong; Satanael
- Past members: Gothmog; Asmoday; Astaroth Daemonum; Nimroth; Inferno; Odium; Lord Mystic; Valefor

Cirith Gorgor is a Dutch black metal band that formed in 1993.

== Discography ==
=== Studio releases ===
- Onwards to the Spectral Defile (1999)
- Unveiling the Essence (2001)
- Firestorm Apocalypse – Tomorrow Shall Know the Blackest Dawn (2004)
- Cirith Gorgor (2007)
- Der Untergang... / Победа !!! (2011)
- Visions of Exalted Lucifer (2016)
- Sovereign (2019)

=== Demos and EPs ===
- Mystic Legends... (demo, 1997)
- Demonic Incarnation (promo, 2002)
- Through Woods of Darkness and Evil (EP, 2002)
- Split with Mor Dagor (EP, 2006)
- Bi Den Dode Hant (EP, 2017)

== Band members ==
=== Current ===
- Levithmong – drums (1996–present), vocals (2006)
- Marchosias – guitar (1999–present)
- Waldtyr – guitar (2010–2012), bass (2012–present)

=== Former ===
- Lord Mystic – bass (1996–2012)
- Nimroth – vocals (1996–2006, 2009–2012)
- Astaroth Daemonum – guitar (1996–2001)
- Asmoday – guitar (1996–1999)
- Inferno – guitars (2002–2008)
- Satanael – vocals (2007–2009, 2013–2019)
- Odium – guitar (2008–2009)
- Valefor – guitar (2012–2020)
- Pestus – vocals (2019-2025)
