= Inferno (role-playing game) =

Front cover

Inferno is a fantasy role-playing game published by Death's Edge Games in 1994.

== Description ==
Inferno is a role-playing game set in Hell. The player have a choice between playing a heroic player character who tries to rescue the souls of the innocent that have been taken by evil forces and aids damned spirits struggling to achieve redemption; or an evil necromancer seeking to conquer Hell. In addition to role-playing rules, the book also contains magical spells, and a compendium of infernal creatures.

=== Character generation ===
Players choose one of four races (mortal, shade, hellspawn, or imp), and roll dice to create the character's attributes. Players then choose a class, which also determines faith status from Faithful to Infernal. Faithful characters are more constrained in terms of actions and magic, but Infernal characters have no protection from more powerful evil beings. To finish the character, the player purchases skills using a pool of creation points.

=== Skill and combat resolution ===
To resolve both skills and combat, the player must roll a twenty-sided die and get the same or less than the target number. For every two points by which a combat roll succeeds, an additional point of damage is done.

== Publication history ==
Inferno is a 136-page perfect-bound book written by Gabe Ivan, with illustrations by Thom Thurman and Sean Parrack, and was published by Death's Edge Games in 1994. The following year, Death's Edge published an expansion supplement, Gods of Hell, and an adventure, Out of the Abyss. No further publications were released.

== Reception ==
In the August 1994 edition of Dragon (#208), Lester W. Smith thought "The game system itself is quite good." But despite this, he believed the game's divide between good and evil players was a built-in weakness. He foresaw that most players would opt for Infernal characters, and then rapidly get bored "with having their characters torment less powerful creatures, and will become frustrated when their own characters suffer at the hands of creatures more powerful than they." He concluded by giving the game an average rating of 4 out of 6, predicting that most players "will just toss the book and go back to their video games."

In the January–February 1995 edition of Shadis (Issue 17), Dirk Dejong didn't think this was the most innovative on the market, except for the setting of Hell, which he thought was ingenious. But he liked the tone of the game, and concluded with a strong recommendation, saying, "It's new, it's funny, it has the capacity to scare the pants off of you, and it gives the good guys a good name once more (as well as giving players a reason to be good)."

== Other recognition ==
A copy of Inferno is held in the collection of the Strong National Museum of Play (object 110.2414).
