= Inferno (Metamorfosi album) =

Studio album by Metamorfosi
- Released: 1973
- Recorded: 1973
- Genres: Progressive rock; symphonic rock
- Length: 40:18
- Label: Vedette Records

Metamorfosi chronology
...E fu il sesto giorno (1972)	Inferno (1973)	Paradiso (2004)

Inferno (pronounced [iɱˈfɛrno]) is the second studio album by the Italian progressive rock band Metamorfosi. It was released in 1973.

It's a concept album in which the protagonists are put to the index of the ills of society (drug dealers, greedy, racist, political, etc.), updating the model proposed in the Divine Comedy of Dante.

== Track listing ==
1. "Introduzione - Selva Oscura" - 7:50
2. "Porta dell'inferno" - 1:20
3. "Caronte" - 1:19
4. "Spacciatore di Droga - Terremoto - Limbo" - 6:22
5. "Lussuriosi" - 3:15
6. "Avari" - 1:32
7. "Violenti" - 3:45
8. "Malebolge" - 1:32
9. "Sfruttatori" - 5:41
10. "Razzisti - Fossa Dei Giganti" - 3:25
11. "Lucifero (Politicanti)" - 2:32
12. "Conclusione" - 1:37
