= Towering Inferno =

Towering Inferno may refer to:

- The Towering Inferno, 1974 disaster movie
- Towering Inferno (band), an English experimental music group which released the 1993 album Kaddish
- Towering Inferno (video game), for the Atari 2600

== See also ==
- List of fires in high-rise buildings
