= Ibn Abi al-Dunya =

Muslim scholar and tutor

‘Abdullāh b. Muḥammad b. ‘Ubayd b. Sufyān b. Abī al-Dunyā عبد الله بن محمد بن عبيد بن سفيان بن أبي الدنيا
- Other names: Ibn Abi al-Dunya; Abu Bakr; Al-Baghdadi
- Years active: c. 870 – 900s
- Era: Abbasid era
- Known for: Tutor to the Abbasid caliphs, al-Mu'tadid and his son, al-Muktafi.
- Notable work: see below
- Father: Muhammad ibn Ubaid

Abdullah Ibn Abi Al-Dunya (208-281 AH) was a hadith scholar, literary historian, and educator. He was renowned for his books on hadith, history, asceticism, heart-softening narratives, and religious admonitions. He was a prolific author and is considered one of the most productive writers during the era of systematic Islamic compilation. His works demonstrate his extensive knowledge and deep understanding of many sciences and arts. Ibn Kathir mentioned that his works exceeded one hundred compilations, while al-Dhahabi counted over one hundred and sixty works, which he listed alphabetically.

He was born in Baghdad at the beginning of the third century Hijri in 208 AH during the Abbasid Caliphate, and lived during the reign of several Abbasid caliphs, serving as a tutor to two of them. He grew up in a household of knowledge and religion and began receiving education from prominent scholars of his time before the age of ten. His biographers mentioned hundreds of teachers under whom he studied, most notably: his father Muhammad bin Ubayd bin Sufyan, Ahmad ibn Hanbal, Abu Khaythama, Abu 'Ubayd al-Qasim bin Sallam, al-Bukhari, Khalaf bin Hisham, and Ali bin al-Ja'd. Many notable scholars studied under him, including Abu Hatim al-Razi and his son, Ahmad bin Muhammad al-Lunbani, and Ahmad bin Salman Al-Najjad.

His era was marked by intellectual brilliance and talented individuals in various fields of thought. Numerous books were written in Quranic exegesis and sciences, hadith sciences (including the six major collections of hadith), jurisprudence and its principles, theology and philosophical theology, Arabic language and literature, history, medicine, pharmacy, and other fields. He died in the month of Jumada al-Ula, 281 AH, at the age of seventy-three.

== Name and Birth ==
His name was Abdullah bin Muhammad bin Ubaid bin Sufyan bin Qais, Al-Qurashi, Al-Baghdadi. He was known by the kunya Abu Bakr and the title Ibn Abi al-Dunya (which became so dominant that he became more famous by this title than his actual name). Scholars refer to him as the Imam, the Hafiz (master of hadith), the Muhaddith (hadith scholar), the Scholar, the Truthful One, and the Educator.

He was born in Baghdad at the beginning of the third century Hijri in 208 AH. He grew up in a house of knowledge, as his father was one of the narrators of historical accounts, and he began seeking knowledge before reaching the age of ten.

== Political Life ==
Ibn Abi Al-Dunya lived during the reign of several Abbasid caliphs, serving as a tutor to two of them: Al-Mu'tadid Billah (d. 289 AH) and Al-Muktafi Billah (d. 295 AH). He died during the caliphate of Al-Mu'tadid Billah. The caliphs he lived during their reigns were:

Al-Ma'mun (198-218 AH) Al-Mu'tasim Billah (218-227 AH) Al-Wathiq Billah (227-232 AH) Al-Mutawakkil Ala-Allah (232-247 AH) Al-Muntasir Billah (247-248 AH) Al-Musta'in Billah (248-252 AH) Al-Mu'taz Billah (252-255 AH) Al-Muhtadi Billah (255-256 AH) Al-Mu'tamid Ala-Allah (256-279 AH) Al-Mu'tadid Billah (279-289 AH)

This era, during which caliphs succeeded one another in such rapid succession, was significant for its political events and Islamic conquests. It was marked by internal conflicts within the ruling Abbasid family, the increasing influence of non-Arabs in state affairs and their eventual control over them, internal revolts throughout the country, the domination of deviant sects over some caliphs and forcing their views upon them, and enemy raids on Muslim territories.

In summary, Ibn Abi al-Dunya witnessed both phases of the Abbasid state: the period of strength from his birth until 247 AH, and then the period of decline from 247 AH until his death.

Ibn Abi al-Dunya's treatise on music, Dhamm al-malālī ('Condemnation of the malāhī'), is believed by Amnon Shiloah (1924–2014) to have been the first systematic attack on music from Islamic scholarship, becoming 'a model for all subsequent texts on the subject'. His understanding of malāhī, as constituting not just "instruments of diversion" but also musics forbidden and for the purposes of amusement only, was an interpretation that 'guided all subsequent authors who dealt with the question of the lawfulness of music'.

== Works ==
Al-Dhahabi remarked about his writings in Siyar A‘lam al-Nubala’: “His writings are very numerous, containing hidden gems and wonders.” He listed around 160 works of Dunya.

The names of his works were also found in an old manuscript in the ‘Umariyya Library, written by hadith scholar al-Mizzī. In it, he listed 167 books. Recently, a researcher and scholar Muhammad Ziyād al-Tuklah, concluded that the total number of his books amounts to 174. These are listed below in alphabetical order:

- Akhbār al-Jafāt ‘inda al-Mawt
- Akhbār al-Khulafā’
- Akhbār al-Mulūk
- Akhbār Daygham
- Akhbār Mu‘āwiyah
- Akhbār Quraysh
- Akhbār Sufyān / Akhbār al-Thawrī
- Akhbār Uways
- al-Adab
- al-Ahwāl / Ahwāl al-Qiyāmah
- al-Akhlāq
- al-Alwiyah
- al-Alḥān
- al-Amr bi al-Ma‘rūf wa al-Nahy ‘an al-Munkar
- al-Amwāl / Iṣlāḥ al-Māl
- al-Anwā’
- al-Ashrāf
- al-Awliyā’ / Karāmāt al-Awliyā’
- al-Aḍāḥī / al-Uḍḥiyah
- al-A‘rāb / Akhbār al-A‘rāb
- al-Ba‘th
- al-Dayn / al-Dīn wa al-Wafā’
- al-Dhikr
- al-Du‘ā’
- al-Faraj ba‘d al-Shiddah
- al-Fatwā
- al-Fawā’id
- al-Funūn
- al-Ghībah wa al-Namīmah / Dhamm al-Ghībah
- al-Hadāyā
- al-Hamm wa al-Ḥuzn
- al-Hawātif
- al-Ikhlāṣ wa al-Niyyah
- al-Ikhwān / al-Ikhwān wa al-Ma‘āṭif
- al-I‘tibār wa A‘qāb al-Surūr wa al-Aḥzān
- al-Jihād
- al-Jīrān
- al-Jū‘
- al-Khayr
- al-Khulafā’
- al-Khātam
- al-Khā’ifīn
- al-Maghāzī
- al-Majūs
- al-Mamlūkīn
- al-Manāmāt
- al-Manāsik
- al-Maraḍ wa al-Kaffārāt
- al-Maṭar wa al-Ra‘d wa al-Barq wa al-Rīḥ
- al-Ma‘īshah
- al-Muntaẓam
- al-Murū’ah
- al-Mutamannin
- al-Muḥtaḍirīn
- al-Nawādir
- al-Nawāzi‘ wa al-Ri‘āyah
- al-Qanā‘ah wa al-Ta‘affuf
- al-Qaṣāṣ
- al-Qiyāmah
- al-Qubūr
- al-Ramī
- al-Raqā’iq
- al-Riqqah wa al-Bukā’
- al-Riḍā ‘an Allāh bi-Qaḍā’ih
- al-Ruhbān
- al-Ruhānā’
- al-Rukhsah fī al-Samā‘
- al-Ru’yā / Ta‘bīr al-Ru’yā
- al-Sabaq
- al-Sakhā’
- al-Shukr li Allāh
- al-Sunnah
- al-Tafakkur wa al-I‘tibār
- al-Tahajjud wa Qiyām al-Layl
- al-Taqwā
- al-Tashammus
- al-Tawakkul
- al-Tawbah
- al-Tawāḍu‘ wa al-Khumūl
- al-Ta‘āzī
- al-Tārīkh
- al-Wajal wa al-Tawaththuq min al-‘Amal
- al-Waqf wa al-Ibtidā’
- al-Wara‘
- al-Waṣāyā
- al-Yaqīn
- al-Zafīr
- al-Zuhd
- al-Ḥadhar wa al-Shafaqah
- al-Ḥawā’ij / Qaḍā’ al-Ḥawā’ij
- al-Ḥayawān
- al-Ḥilm / al-Ḥilm wa Dhamm al-Faḥsh
- al-Ṣabr
- al-Ṣadaqah
- al-Ṣalāh ‘alā al-Nabī ﷺ
- al-Ṣamt wa Ādāb al-Lisān
- al-Ṭabaqāt
- al-Ṭawā‘īn
- al-‘Afw wa Dhamm al-Ghaḍab
- al-‘Aql wa Faḍluh
- al-‘Awwadh
- al-‘Awābid
- al-‘Ilm
- al-‘Iyāl / al-Nafaqah ‘alā al-‘Iyāl
- al-‘Umr wa al-Shayb
- al-‘Uqūbāt
- al-‘Uzlah wa al-Infirād
- al-‘Īdayn
- Dalā’il al-Nubuwwah
- Dhamm al-Baghī
- Dhamm al-Bukhl
- Dhamm al-Dunyā
- Dhamm al-Faqr
- Dhamm al-Malāhī
- Dhamm al-Muskir
- Dhamm al-Ribā
- Dhamm al-Riyā’
- Dhamm al-Shahawāt
- Dhamm al-Ḍaḥik
- Dhamm al-Ḥasad
- Dhikr al-Mawt / al-Mawt
- Faḍl ‘Āshūrā’
- Faḍā’il al-Qur’ān
- Faḍā’il al-‘Abbās
- Faḍā’il Lā Ilāha Illā Allāh
- Faḍā’il Ramaḍān
- Faḍā’il ‘Alī
- Faḍā’il ‘Ashr Dhī al-Ḥijjah
- Inqilāb al-Zamān
- Inzāl al-Ḥājah bi Allāh
- Iṣlāḥ al-Māl
- Iṣṭinā‘ al-Ma‘rūf
- I‘ṭā’ al-Sā’il
- Kalām al-Layālī wa al-Ayyām li-Ibn Ādam / al-Layālī wa al-Ayyām
- Makārim al-Akhlāq
- Makā’id al-Shayṭān
- Man ‘Āsha ba‘d al-Mawt
- Maqtal al-Zubayr
- Maqtal al-Ḥusayn
- Maqtal Sa‘īd ibn Jubayr
- Maqtal Ṭalḥah
- Maqtal ‘Abd Allāh ibn al-Zubayr
- Maqtal ‘Alī ibn Abī Ṭālib
- Maqtal ‘Umar
- Maqtal ‘Uthmān
- Mawā‘iẓ al-Khulafā’
- Ma‘ārīḍ al-Kalām / Mu‘āraḍ al-Kalām
- Mudārāt al-Nās
- Mujābū al-Du‘āh
- Muḥāsabat al-Nafs
- Qaḍā’ al-Ḥawā’ij
- Qaṣr al-Amal
- Qurā al-Ḍayf
- Sawād al-Shayb
- Shajarat Ṭūbā
- Sharaf al-Faqr
- Sidrat al-Muntahā
- Taghayyur al-Ikhwān
- Taghyīr al-Zamān
- Tazwīj Fāṭimah raḍiyallāhu ‘anhā
- Tārīkh al-Khulafā’
- Zuhd Mālik ibn Dīnār
- Ḥilm al-Aḥnaf ibn Qays
- Ḥilm al-Ḥulamā’
- Ḥilm Mu‘āwiyah
- Ḥurūf Khalaf
- Ḥusn al-Ẓann bi Allāh
- Ṣadaqat al-Fiṭr
- Ṣifat al-Jannah
- Ṣifat al-Mīzān
- Ṣifat al-Nabī ﷺ
- Ṣifat al-Nār
- Ṣifat al-Ṣirāṭ
- ‘Uqūbat al-Anbiyā’

== See also ==
- Islamic Golden Age
- Abbasid Caliphate
- Islamic music
