= Sura (disambiguation) =

A Surah is a chapter of the Qur'an.

Sura may also refer to:

== People ==
- Bob Sura (born 1973), American former basketball player
- Lucius Licinius Sura (40–108/113), Roman senator and close associate of Emperor Trajan
- Publius Cornelius Lentulus Sura (died 63 BC), stepfather of Mark Anthony and participant in the Second Catilinarian conspiracy
- Aemilius Sura, Roman historian (1st century BC or AD)
- Sura Saenkham (born 1959), Thai boxer, called Khaosai Galaxy
- Sura, the wife of Spartacus in the television series Spartacus: Blood and Sand
- Sura-dharman, a character in the 11th-century Indian story collection Shringara-manjari-katha

== Places ==
- Sura (city), a city in ancient Babylonia
  - Sura Academy, a Jewish Yeshiva Academy in this city
- Sura (Lycia), a town in ancient Lycia, now in Turkey
- Sura, Syria, a city in Syria and a former Bishopric (currently a titular see)
- Sura (river), 5 rivers in Russia
- Sura, a village in Slivilești Commune, Gorj County, Romania
- Șura Mare, a commune in Sibiu County, Romania
- Șura Mică, a commune in Sibiu County, Romania
- Sura (state constituency), state constituency in Malaysia

== Food and drink ==
- Sura (alcoholic drink), an alcoholic drink used as an anaesthetic in ancient India
- Sura, honorific form of bap, food for the monarch in the Korean cuisine

== Other ==
- Rajarsitulyakula, also called Sura dynasty, a dynasty in India
- Sura (film), a 2010 Indian Tamil film starring Vijay
- Sura (moth), a genus of moth
- SNORA and SURA-D rockets, an unguided Swiss air-to-surface rocket
- Sura Ionospheric Heating Facility, a research facility in Russia
- Calf (leg) (Latin: sura), the back portion of the lower leg in human anatomy
- Deva (Hinduism), or Sura, a minor, benevolent deity in Hinduism
- Sura, the first month in the Javanese calendar
- SURA, the Southeastern Universities Research Association
- Shan United Revolutionary Army

== See also ==
- Sara (disambiguation)
- Sera (disambiguation)
- Sira (disambiguation)
- Sora (disambiguation)
- Syra
