= Silat Bridge =

Sacred bridge in Lalish, Iraq

In Yazidism, the Silat Bridge is a bridge in Lalish, Iraq that leads to the most holy Yazidi shrine. It symbolizes the connection and crossing over from the profane earthly world and the sacred, esoteric world. As with the Chinvat Bridge in Zoroastrianism, the Silat Bridge in will also play a role at the end of times in Yazidism (Kreyenbroek 2005: 39).

Every year, thousands of Yazidi pilgrims arrive at the bridge for the Feast of the Assembly as they cross the bridge to the sacred site of Sheikh Adi's tomb.

== See also ==
- As-Sirāt
- Bifröst
- Brig of Dread
- Chinvat Bridge
- Matarta
- Vaitarna River
- Otherworld
- Zoroastrian eschatology
