= Sirat =

Sirat may refer to:

- Ṣirāṭ, an Arabic word meaning 'way' or 'path'
- Sīrat, an Arabic word meaning 'conduct', used to refer to a literary genre
- Sirat, Algeria
- Sirāt (film), a 2025 drama film

== See also ==
- Sira (disambiguation)
- Sirah (disambiguation)
