= Chinvat Bridge =

Zoroastrian mythological location

The Chinvat Bridge (Avestan: 𐬗𐬌𐬥𐬬𐬀𐬙𐬋 𐬞𐬈𐬭𐬈𐬙𐬏𐬨 Cinvatô Peretûm, "bridge of judgement" or "beam-shaped bridge") or the Bridge of the Requiter in Zoroastrianism is the sifting bridge, which separates the world of the living from the world of the dead. All souls must cross the bridge upon death. The bridge is guarded by two four-eyed dogs, described in the Videvdat (Vendidad) 13,9 as 'spâna pəšu.pâna' ("two bridge-guarding dogs").

The Bridge's appearance varies depending on the observer's asha, or righteousness. As related in the text known as the Bundahishn, if a person has been wicked, the bridge will appear narrow and the demon Chinnaphapast will emerge and drag their soul into the druj-demana (the House of Lies), a place of eternal punishment and suffering similar to the concept of Hell. If a person's good thoughts, words and deeds in life are many, the bridge will be wide enough to cross, and the Daena, a spirit representing revelation, will appear and lead the soul into Garo Demana (the House of Song). Those souls that successfully cross the bridge are united with Ahura Mazda.

Often, the Chinvat Bridge is identified with the rainbow, or with the Milky Way galaxy, such as in Professor C.P. Tiele's History of Religion. However, other scholars such as C.F. Keary and Ferdinand Justi disagree with this interpretation, citing descriptions of the Chinvat Bridge as straight upward, rather than curvilinear.

Three divinities are thought to be guardians of the Chinvat Bridge: Sraosha (Conscience), Mithra (Covenant) and Rashnu (Justice).

Alternate names for this bridge include Chinwad, Cinvat, Chinvar or Chinavat.

The last gateway to Heaven and Hell; As-Sirāt in Islam is similar to concept of Chinvat.

== In scripture ==
In the 71st chapter of the Avestan text, the Yasna, there is a description of the Chinvat Bridge.

Ŷatha vashi ashâum idha anghô ashava frapârayånghe urvânem tarô cinvatô peretûm vahishtahe anghêush ashava jasô ushtavaitîm gâthãm srâvayô ushtatâtem nimraomnô, (zôt u râspî,) ushtâ ahmâi ... gaêm mananghô!	As thou dost desire, O holy (one)! so shalt thou be, holy shalt thou-cause [thy] soul to pass over the Chinvat Bridge; holy shalt thou come into Heaven. Thou shalt intone the Gatha Ushtavaiti, reciting the salvation hail.

The Vendidad also describes the Chinvat Bridge in fargard 19.

27. dâtare ... dva tâ dâthra bavaiñti dva tâ dâthra pârayeiñti dva tâ dâthra pairi-bavaiñti dva tâ dâthra paiti hañjaseñti mashyô astvaiñti anghvô havâi urune para-daidhyât.; 28. âat mraot ahurô mazdå, pasca para-iristahe mashyehe pasca frasaxtahe mashyehe pasca pairithnem dereniñti daêva drvañtô duzhdånghô, thrityå xshapô vîusaiti ushi raocaiti bâmya gairinãm ashahvâthranãm âsenaoiti mithrem huzaênem hvarexshaêtem uzyôraiti, 29. vîzareshô daêvô nãma spitama zarathushtra urvânem bastem vâdhayeiti drvatãm daêvayasnanãm merezujîtîm mashyânãm, pathãm zrvô-dâtanãm jasaiti ýasca drvaite ýasca ashaone cinvat-peretûm mazdadhâtãm baodhasca urvânemca ýâtem gaêthanãm paiti-jaidhyeiñti dâtem astvaiñti anghvô.; 30. hâu srîra kereta taxma huraodha jasaiti spânavaiti nivavaiti pasvaiti ýaoxshtavaiti hunaravaiti, hâ drvatãm akhem urvânô temô-hva nizarshaite, hâ ashâunãm urvânô tarasca harãm berezaitîm âsenaoiti tarô cinvatô peretûm vîdhârayeiti haêtô mainyavanãm ýazatanãm.	27. O Maker of the material world, thou Holy One! Where are the rewards given? Where does the rewarding take place? Where is the rewarding fulfilled? Whereto do men come to take the reward that, during their life in the material world, they have won for their souls?; 28. Ahura Mazda answered: 'When the man is dead, when his time is over, then the wicked, evil-doing Daevas cut off his eyesight. On the third night, when the dawn appears and brightens up, when Mithra, the god with beautiful weapons, reaches the all-happy mountains, and the sun is rising; 29. 'Then the fiend, named Vizaresha, O Spitama Zarathushtra, carries off in bonds the souls of the wicked Daeva-worshippers who live in sin. The soul enters the way made by Time, and open both to the wicked and to the righteous. At the head of the Chinwad bridge, the holy bridge made by Mazda, they ask for their spirits and souls the reward for the worldly goods which they gave away here below.; 30. 'Then comes the beautiful, well-shapen, strong and well-formed maid, with the dogs at her sides, one who can distinguish, who has many children, happy, and of high understanding. 'She makes the soul of the righteous one go up above the Hara-berezaiti; above the Chinwad bridge she places it in the presence of the heavenly gods themselves.

== In literature ==
Dimitris Lyacos's second part of the Poena Damni trilogy With the People from the Bridge alludes to the Chinvat Bridge. In the book a bridge functions as part of the setting of a makeshift performance but also as a narrative element that connects the world of the living with the world of the dead.

American poet Charles Olson refers to the Chinvat Bridge ("Cinvat" in his reading) in his epic, The Maximus Poems – a work which deals with Avestan mythology, among numerous others.

== External influence ==
Cyrus Niknam, a Mobad, writer and researcher of ancient Iranian culture, denies the existence of a bridge and considers the idea to have come from other religions in the Sassanian era:

In Zoroastrian hymns, a passage called "Chinovat Perito" is mentioned. This word consists of two parts: "Chin," meaning "how," and "Perito," meaning "passage." Therefore, this word would serve as a gateway to how to live, in this vision, there is no mention of the materiality of such a passage for the soul through the past. Perhaps a time will come when every human being will consult their conscience and question it after every behavior or action they have undertaken.

The priests of the Sassanid era followed the culture of others who had arrived in Iran at that time, adapting and harmonizing beliefs about heaven, hell, the afterlife, and their history in order to better understand and comprehend the material life of the time for Iranian Zoroastrians, thus, in Zoroaster's thought, heaven and hell, initiated by a monk named Arday Viraz, led to the writing of the Pahlavi poem "Book of Arda Viraf," and took on a different form.

The rewards and punishments of deceased human bodies were also predicted. Heaven and Hell are given paths and roads (in a short Avesta text called the Batit), and the Chinvad Pass is also described as a bridge (wide and wide for the righteous, thin as hair for the sinners) that a departing soul must cross under special circumstances to reach Heaven or be led to Hell.

Such a definition, which follows a different culture, is clearly incorrect and inconsistent with the wise vision of Ashura Zoroaster. A religion that was transformed and developed by the ideas of the priests of that time, sometimes out of necessity or ignorance, even though it also used the name Zoroaster, undoubtedly the recommendations and visions of that time sometimes conflicted with the true vision of the teacher of truth and wisdom, Ashura Zoroaster, mentioned in his poems (the Gathas).

== In visual culture ==
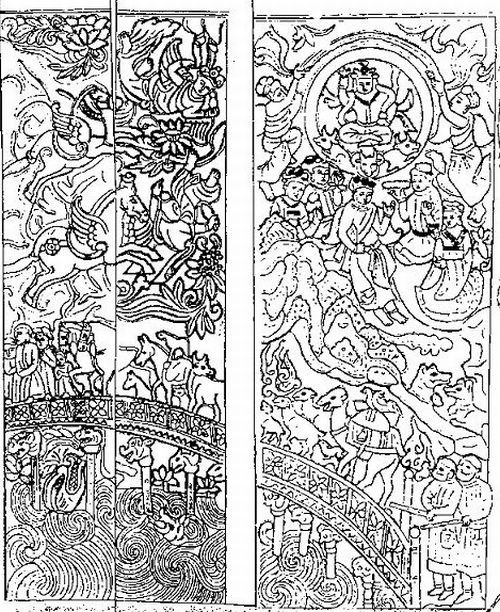
Chinvat Bridge on the sarcophagus of Wirkak.

Representations of bridges on early medieval Sogdian funerary couches have been identified as the Chinvat Bridge. The most notable of these appears on the east wall of the funerary couch of the sabao Wirkak excavated at Xi'an, and another fragmentary depiction appears on the funerary couch in the Miho Museum.

== Yazidi parallel ==
In Yazidism, the Silat Bridge is a bridge in Lalish that leads to the most holy Yazidi shrine. It symbolizes the connection and crossing over from the profane earthly world and the sacred, esoteric world. As in Zoroastrianism, the Silat Bridge will also play a role at the end of times in Yazidism (Kreyenbroek 2005: 39).

== See also ==
- As-Sirāt
- Bifröst
- Brig of Dread
- Matarta
- Vaitarna River
- Otherworld
- Silat Bridge
- Zoroastrian eschatology
