= The priest of the parish =

Party game

The priest of the parish (or the priest has lost his cap) is a party game for 50–150 people and one chair for each person. The chairs are arranged in rows of equal numbers (for example, ten rows of five), half of them facing the other. Each row of chairs is given a number from one to ten. The players get into teams of five and each team sits in one of the ten rows.

One person, who is running the game (who is called the Gossiper) says: "The priest of the parish has lost his considering cap. Some say this, and some say that, but I say it was team number X." That team stands up all at once and says (in unison), "Who me sir?" The team and the Gossiper have a conversation, which runs like this:

Gossiper: "The priest of the parish has lost his considering cap. Some say this, and some say that, but I say it was team number X."
Team X: "Who me sir?"
Gossiper: "Yes, you sir."
Team X: "Couldn't be, sir!"
Gossiper: "Then who, sir?"
Team X: "Team number Y, sir!"

At this point, all of team Y stands up and says "Who me sir?" and so on. This continues until a team fails to stand up together, a team speaks out of unison or the wrong team stands up. When one of these happens, the team that made the mistake goes to the bottom row of chairs, and all of the teams below them move up. The whole process starts again with the Gossiper talking to a team.

The aim is to be furthest away from the "losing row" when the Gossiper decides the game is over.

Priest of the Parish reportedly dates back to the Napoleonic Wars of the early 19th century.

== Zimbabwean variation ==
An individual variation on this game that is common amongst Zimbabwean Scout troops goes something like this:

Everyone sits in a circle. One person (usually the person organizing the game) is the "priest". Players are numbered clockwise from the priest. The first player is "Matthew", then "Mark", "Luke", and "John". The remaining players are numbered sequentially from one, except the last player (the one to the right of the priest) who is the "dogbox".

The aim of the game is become the priest. Anyone who makes a mistake goes to the dogbox (and everyone moves up a position). Game play is very similar to what's described above. Each round starts with the priest saying: "The priest of the parish has lost his thinking cap. Some say this, and some say that, but I say it was X. 1. 2. 3. Down."

Person X has to respond before the priest reaches "down" or they go to the dogbox. Likewise, anyone who responds incorrectly, or out of turn, also goes to the dogbox. The correct response refrain goes like this:

X: "Who me sir?"
P: "Yes, you sir!"
X: "Nay, not I sir."
P: "Then who sir?"
X: "I say it was Y. 1. 2. 3. Down."

Whereupon the refrain is repeated between X and Y, with player Y attempting to get out player Z at the end. This is repeated indefinitely until someone makes a mistake and goes to the dogbox.

The challenges in this version of the game are remembering who you are (it might change every time someone goes to the dogbox) and answering quickly enough. There's considerable scope for strategy, particularly in moving the priest to the dogbox.

To help new players, the chairs are sometimes labelled with their correct "number", although this does remove some of the fun that comes from complete confusion.

== The Prince of Paris ==
Another version is titled "The Prince of Paris" and is played with all the people in a line (about 15–20). They are numbered from the beginning of the line on down. The conversation goes:

Leader: The Prince of Paris has lost his hat and number X knows where it's at!
Number X: Who sir, me sir?
L: Yes Sir, you sir!
N: No not I, sir!
L: Then who sir?
N: Number Y knows where it's at!
L: Number Y sir, I've got you sir!

If number Y does not respond with "Who sir me sir?" before the leader finishes his last line, number Y moves to the end of the line. It is up to the individuals to keep up with their changing numbers and therefore fast-paced play is encouraged. Also, you cannot reply with the previous number. Therefore, if number 7 says number 13 then number 13 cannot say number 7, and likewise who ever number 13 says, cannot say number 13 but they could say number 7.

== Named chairs ==
Accusations and denials fly around the room in an orderly patterned sequence as to who may have taken the hat. Each respondent must reply within the count of 5:

Leader: "The priest of the parish has lost his considering cap. Some say this, and some say that, but I say name X, 1 2 3 4 5”
X: “What I sir?”…
L: “Yes you sir!”…
X: “No not I sir”…
L: “Who then sir?”…
X: “<name> 1 2 3 4 5”…

starting the whole cycle all over again.

The trick of the game is that while the first chair in the circle is the priest and next to him is his lieutenant Man Jack, each subsequent chair around the circle is named after the person sitting in it at the beginning of the game. When someone fails to respond or mixes up the sequence of bantering words they are sent to the 'bottom', or in other words the last chair and the others move up, thereby assuming the name or title of the new chair they occupy.

As an example if Jeremy moves up to Bridget's chair he has to respond to the name Bridget until he moves up to the next seat or is sent to the bottom. The object of the game is to move up to be the priest.

Of course there can be liberal interpretation as to what constitutes a violation of the rules such as inexact responses or delays in responses or untimely responses, but it can be left up to the priest to make a decision (or mob rule in the case of priest violations since Man Jack in unlikely to be trusted).

== Drama training ==
This exercise is also used for drama training. The script familiar to this editor was

A: "I say number B"
B: "Who, Sir(rah)? Me, Sir(rah)?"
A: "Yes, Sir(rah). You, Sir(rah)!"
B: "Oh, no, Sir(rah)! Not me, Sir(rah)!"
A: "Who, then, Sir(rah)?"

The sir/sirrah distinction was used to demark relative status and the various participants were obliged to interpret their script by choosing an emotion selected from a wide range – confidence, arrogance, fear, offence, surprise, etc.

== Dinner Party variation ==
The Priest is at the head of a table (wearing a silly hat). To the left of the Priest is Man Jack, then One, Two etc. It's recommended to number off, especially after much wine, so everyone knows who they are. The object is to become the Priest by the end of the game. The Priest starts the round with these words:

Priest: "The Priest of the Parish has lost his hat. Some say this. Some say that. I say X".
X: "What I, Sir?"
Priest: "Yes you, Sir!"
X: "Not I, Sir."
Priest: "Then who, Sir?"
X: "Y"
Y: "What I, Sir?"
X: "Yes You, Sir!"
and so on...

The words have to be said exactly right otherwise you are demoted to the end of the table (a drink is usually involved) and become the last number. Everyone is then required shift to the right one seat and then assumes that position's number (or name).

The game finishes when everyone has had enough.

== King Plaster Palacey ==
"King Plaster Palacey" is a variation similar to The Prince of Paris is played with a King and three sons named White Cap, Red Cap, Brown Cap.

Red Cap says, "Plaster Palacey had a son, whose name was old daddy White Cap."

White Cap, in an injured voice, says, "Me, sir?" The King says, "Yes, sir." White Cap answers, "You're a liar, sir." The King then says, "Who then, sir?" White Cap answers, "Old daddy Red Cap."

Some versions incorporate elements of the obsolete marriage custom of disguising the bride and placing her among her bridesmaids and other girls. The bridegroom must correctly select his bride before being allowed to leave the ceremony.

King William was King George's son, From the Bay of Biscay O! Upon his breast he wore a star-- Find your way to English schools. Down on the carpet you must kneel; As the grass grows in the field, Salute your bride and kiss her sweet, And rise again upon your feet.
