= Hell =

Abode of the dead, in various cultures

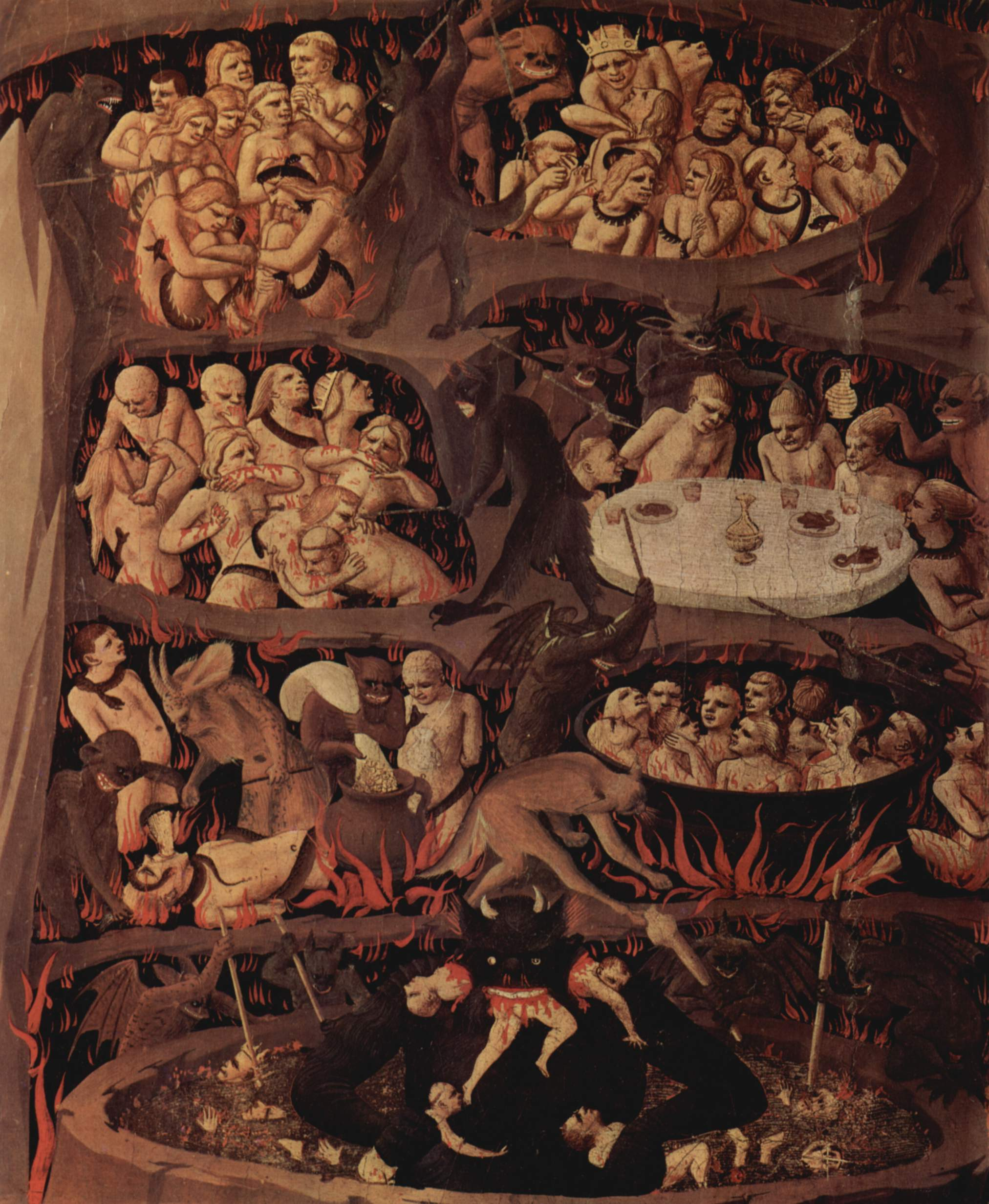
The Last Judgment (detail), c.1431, by Fra Angelico depicting people being tormented in hell

In religion and folklore, Hell is a location or state in the afterlife in which souls are subjected to punishment after death. Religions with a linear divine history sometimes depict hells as eternal, such as in some versions of Christianity, whereas religions with reincarnation usually depict a hell as an intermediary period between incarnations, as is the case in the Indian religions. Religions typically locate Hell in another dimension or under Earth's surface. Other afterlife destinations include heaven, paradise, purgatory, limbo, and the underworld.

Other religions, which do not conceive of the afterlife as a place of punishment or reward, merely describe an abode of the dead, the grave, a neutral place that is located under the surface of Earth (for example, see Kur, Hades, and Sheol). Such places are sometimes equated with the English word hell, though a more correct translation would be "underworld" or "world of the dead". The ancient Mesopotamian, Greek, Roman, and Finnic religions include entrances to the underworld from the land of the living.

== Etymology ==
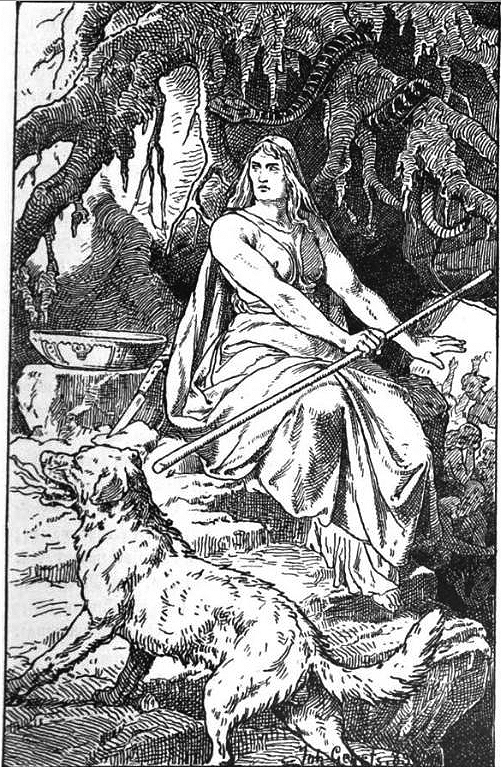
Hel (1889) by Johannes Gehrts, depicts the Old Norse Hel, a goddess-like figure, in the location of the same name, which she oversees

The modern English word hell is derived from Old English hel, helle (first attested around 725 AD to refer to a nether world of the dead) reaching into the Anglo-Saxon pagan period. The word has cognates in all branches of the Germanic languages, including Old Norse hel (which refers to both a location and goddess-like being in Norse mythology), Old Frisian helle, Old Saxon hellia, Old High German hella, and Gothic halja. All forms ultimately derive from the reconstructed Proto-Germanic feminine noun *xaljō or *haljō ('concealed place, the underworld'). In turn, the Proto-Germanic form derives from the o-grade form of the Proto-Indo-European root *kel-, *kol-: 'to cover, conceal, save'. Indo-European cognates include Latin cēlāre ("to hide", related to the English word cellar) and early Irish ceilid ("hides"). Upon the Christianisation of the Germanic peoples, extensions of the Proto-Germanic *xaljō were reinterpreted to denote the underworld in Christian mythology (see Gehenna).

Related early Germanic terms and concepts include Proto-Germanic *xalja-rūnō(n), a feminine compound noun, and *xalja-wītjan, a neutral compound noun. This form is reconstructed from the Latinized Gothic plural noun *haliurunnae (attested by Jordanes; according to philologist Vladimir Orel, meaning 'witches'), Old English helle-rúne ('sorceress, necromancer', according to Orel), and Old High German helli-rūna 'magic'. The compound is composed of two elements: *xaljō (*haljō) and *rūnō, the Proto-Germanic precursor to Modern English rune. The second element in the Gothic haliurunnae may however instead be an agent noun from the verb rinnan ("to run, go"), which would make its literal meaning "one who travels to the netherworld".

Proto–Germanic *xalja-wītjan (or *halja-wītjan) is reconstructed from Old Norse hel-víti 'hell', Old English helle-wíte 'hell-torment, hell', Old Saxon helli-wīti 'hell', and the Middle High German feminine noun helle-wīze. The compound is a compound of *xaljō (discussed above) and *wītjan (reconstructed from forms such as Old English witt 'right mind, wits', Old Saxon gewit 'understanding', and Gothic un-witi 'foolishness, understanding').

== Origins ==
The idea of retribution for evil thoughts and evil deeds features almost universally in human cultural history. Accordingly, justice may be carried out post-mortem, whereby positing a place of punishment in the afterlife. As early as 1500 BCE, the Egyptians asserted that the dead will be judged and, if found guilty, punished and tortured for their crimes. One of the oldest detailed descriptions of Hell, however, are probably found in the Kathāvatthu, one of the earliest Buddhist writings written around 250—100 BCE. It argues that Hell is a state as the result of a bad action, connecting Hell to the concept of the retribution for bad actions and compensation for good actions. Such concept of Hell did not require the existence of a God and does not depend on deities.

Within the context of Persian dualism, which posits the existence of the embodiment of good and evil, Hell was considered to be the abode of the principal Devil called Angra Manyu. According to Mazdaist eschatology, the dead are not condemned to Hell, but freely choose paradise or Hell determined by their actions in life, which either corresponds to the values of God or the Devil. In the mythological narrative, Hell is believed to be in the middle of Earth, a bridge spans over it, and the dead must pass over Hell, but those who did evil in life will fall down. In Hell, the souls are tormented by the inhabitants of Hell; demons, and tortured according to their crimes and sins. However, their torment is not eternal, as eventually God would triumph over the Devil and his demons, destroy Hell, restore cosmic order, and redeem the lost souls.

In the New Testament, part of the Christian sacred scripture, references to Hell are sparse. The Septuagint understanding of Hades is similar to the Hebrew Sheol, a place for the dead to await resurrection. Gehenna, on the other hand, is portrayed differently, as containing "unquenchable fire" and "worms that never die" where body and soul can be destroyed. As evident from apocrypha, such as Ethiopic Book of Enoch, the idea of the underworld and Hell begin to conflate: In the Ethiopic Book of Enoch, the apostate Jews will suffer in Gehenna and for the Rabbis, it was a temporal punishment for Jews, but eternal for the Gentiles. Closely after the composition of the New Testament, the idea arose that the Devil is also a prisoner to Hell.

== Punishment ==
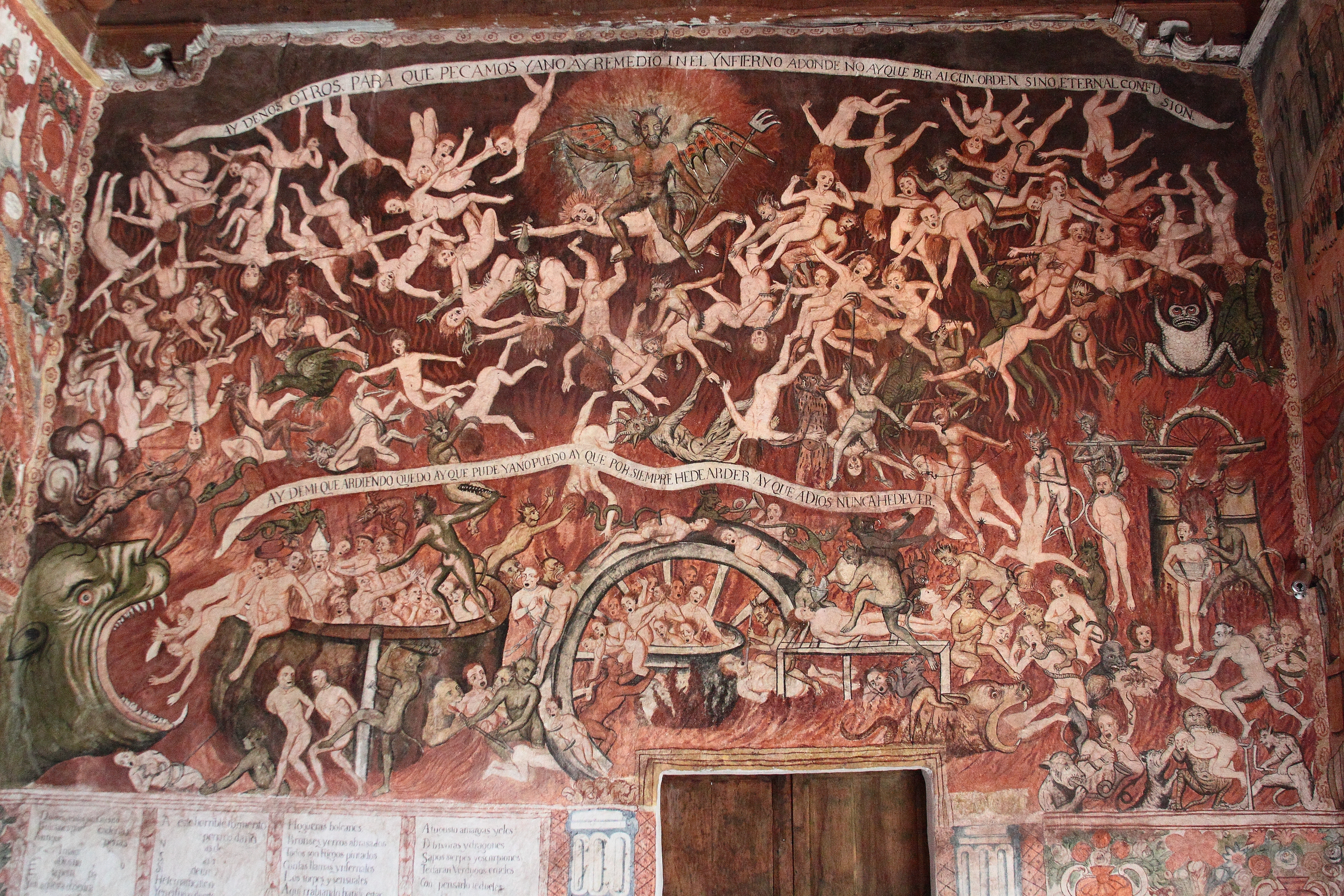
Preserved colonial wall paintings of 1802 depicting Hell, by Tadeo Escalante, inside the Church of San Juan Bautista in Huaro, Peru

Punishment in Hell typically corresponds to sins committed during life. Sometimes these distinctions are specific, with damned souls suffering for each sin committed, such as in Plato's Myth of Er or Dante's The Divine Comedy, but sometimes they are general, with condemned sinners relegated to one or more chambers of Hell or to a level of suffering.

Despite common depictions of Hell as a place containing fire, some other traditions portray Hell as cold. Buddhist – and particularly Tibetan Buddhist – descriptions of Hell feature an equal number of hot and cold hells. Among Christian descriptions Dante's Inferno portrays the innermost (9th) circle of Hell as a frozen lake of blood and guilt. But cold also played a part in earlier Christian depictions of Hell or Purgatory, beginning with the Apocalypse of Paul, originally from the early third century; the "Vision of Dryhthelm" by the Venerable Bede from the seventh century; "St Patrick's Purgatory", "The Vision of Tundale" or "Visio Tnugdali", and the "Vision of the Monk of Eynsham", all from the twelfth century; and the "Vision of Thurkill" from the early thirteenth century.

== Examples in different religions ==
=== Ancient Egypt ===
In this Book of the Dead scene, a person's heart is weighed on the scale of Maat against the feather of truth, by the canine-headed Anubis. Thoth, scribe of the gods, records the result. If his heart is lighter than the feather, the person is allowed to pass into the afterlife. If not, he is eaten by the crocodile-headed Ammit.

With the rise of the cult of Osiris during the Middle Kingdom, the "democratization of religion" offered to even his humblest followers the prospect of eternal life, with moral fitness becoming the dominant factor in determining a person's suitability.

At death a person faced judgment by a tribunal of forty-two divine judges. If they had led a life in conformance with the precepts of the goddess Maat, who represented truth and right living, the person was welcomed into the heavenly reed fields. If found guilty the person was thrown to Ammit, the "devourer of the dead" and would be condemned to the lake of fire.

The person taken by the devourer is subject first to terrifying punishment and then annihilated. These depictions of punishment may have influenced medieval perceptions of the inferno in Hell via early Christian and Coptic texts.

Purification for those considered justified appears in the descriptions of "Flame Island", where humans experience the triumph over evil and rebirth. For the damned complete destruction into a state of non-being awaits but there is no suggestion of eternal torture; the weighing of the heart in Egyptian mythology can lead to annihilation.

The Tale of Khaemwese describes the torment of a rich man, who lacked charity, when he dies and compares it to the blessed state of a poor man who has also died. Divine pardon at judgment always remained a central concern for the ancient Egyptians.

Modern understanding of Egyptian notions of Hell relies on six ancient texts:

1. The Book of Two Ways (Book of the Ways of Rosetau)
2. The Book of Amduat (Book of the Hidden Room, Book of That Which Is in the Underworld)
3. The Book of Gates
4. The Book of the Dead (Book of Going Forth by Day)
5. The Book of the Earth
6. The Book of Caverns

=== Ancient Mesopotamia ===
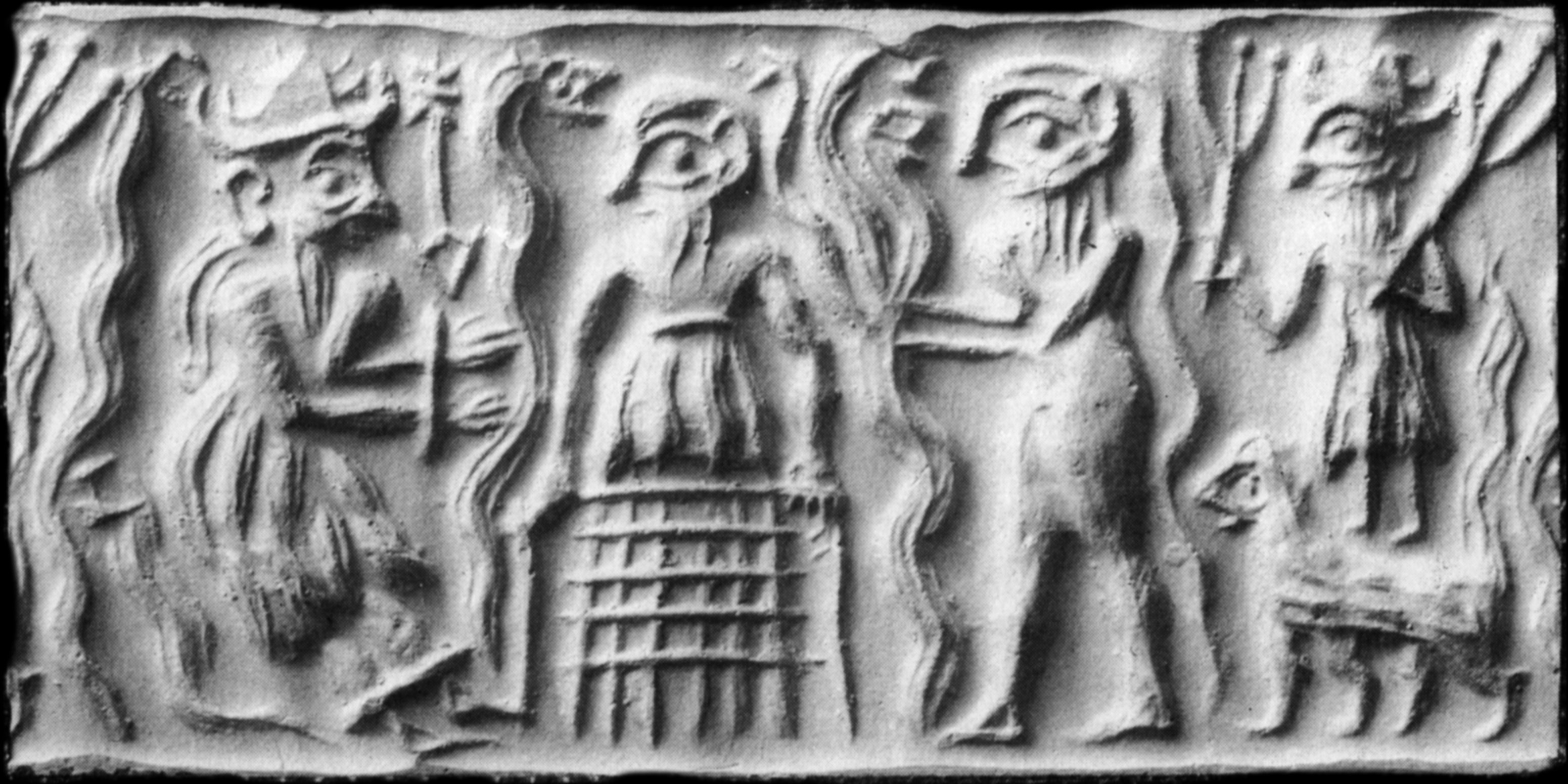
Ancient Sumerian cylinder seal impression showing the god Dumuzid being tortured in the Underworld by galla demons

The Sumerian afterlife was a dark, dreary cavern located deep below the ground, where inhabitants were believed to continue "a shadowy version of life on earth". This bleak domain was known as Kur, and was believed to be ruled by the goddess Ereshkigal. All souls went to the same afterlife, and a person's actions during life had no effect on how the person would be treated in the world to come.

The souls in Kur were believed to eat nothing but dry dust and family members of the deceased would ritually pour libations into the dead person's grave through a clay pipe, thereby allowing the dead to drink. Nonetheless, funerary evidence indicates that some people believed that the goddess Inanna, Ereshkigal's younger sister, had the power to award her devotees with special favors in the afterlife. During the Third Dynasty of Ur, it was believed that a person's treatment in the afterlife depended on how he or she was buried; those that had been given sumptuous burials would be treated well, but those who had been given poor burials would fare poorly.

The entrance to Kur was believed to be located in the Zagros Mountains in the far east. It had seven gates, through which a soul needed to pass. The god Neti was the gatekeeper. Galla were a class of demons that were believed to reside in the underworld; their primary purpose appears to have been to drag unfortunate mortals back to Kur. They are frequently referenced in magical texts, and some texts describe them as being seven in number. Several extant poems describe the galla dragging the god Dumuzid into the underworld. The later Mesopotamians knew this underworld by its East Semitic name: Irkalla. During the Akkadian Period, Ereshkigal's role as the ruler of the underworld was assigned to Nergal, the god of death. The Akkadians attempted to harmonize this dual rulership of the underworld by making Nergal Ereshkigal's husband.

=== Ancient Greece and Rome ===
In classic Greek mythology, below heaven, Earth, and Pontus is Tartarus, or Tartaros (Ancient Greek: Τάρταρος). It is either a deep, gloomy place, a pit or abyss used as a dungeon of torment and suffering that resides within Hades (the entire underworld) with Tartarus being the hellish component. In the Gorgias, Plato (c. 400 BC) wrote that souls of the deceased were judged after they paid for crossing the river of the dead and those who received punishment were sent to Tartarus. As a place of punishment, it can be considered a hell. The classic Hades, on the other hand, is more similar to Old Testament Sheol. The Romans later adopted these views.

=== East Africa ===
The hell of Swahili mythology is called kuzimu, and belief in it developed in the 7th and 8th century under the influence of Muslim merchants at the East African coast. It is imagined as very cold.

=== West Africa ===
Serer religion rejects the general notion of heaven and hell. In Serer religion, acceptance by the ancestors who have long departed is as close to any heaven as one can get. Rejection and becoming a wandering soul is a sort of hell for one passing over. The souls of the dead must make their way to Jaaniw (the sacred dwelling place of the soul). Only those who have lived their lives on earth in accordance with Serer doctrines will be able to make this necessary journey and thus be accepted by the ancestors. Those who cannot make the journey become lost and wandering souls.

In Yoruba religion, irredeemably wicked people (guilty of e.g. theft, witchcraft, murder, or cruelty) are confined to Ọrun Apaadi (heaven of clay potsherds), while the good and charitable people continue to live in the ancestral realm, Orun Baba Eni (heaven of the fathers of humanity).

=== Pacific ===
The Bagobo of the Philippines have the otherworld "Gimokodan", where the Red Region is reserved who those who died in battle, while ordinary people go to the White Region.

=== East Asia ===
According to a few sources, Hell is below ground, and described as an uninviting wet or fiery place reserved for sinful people in the Ainu religion, as stated by missionary John Batchelor. However, belief in Hell does not appear in oral tradition of the Ainu. Instead, there is belief within the Ainu religion that the soul of the deceased (ramat) would become a kamuy after death. There is also belief that the soul of someone who has been wicked during lifetime, committed suicide, got murdered or died in great agony would become a ghost (tukap) who would haunt the living, to come to fulfillment from which it was excluded during life.

=== Judaism ===
Judaism does not have a specific doctrine about the afterlife, but it does have a mystical/Orthodox tradition of describing Gehinnom. Gehinnom is originally a grave and in later times a sort of Purgatory where one is judged based on one's life's deeds, or rather, where one becomes fully aware of one's own shortcomings and negative actions during one's life. The Kabbalah explains it as a "waiting room" (commonly translated as an "entry way") for all souls (not just the wicked). The overwhelming majority of rabbinic thought maintains that people are not in Gehinnom forever; the longest that one can be there is said to be 12 months, however, there has been the occasional noted exception. Some consider it a spiritual forge where the soul is purified for its eventual ascent to Olam Habah (heb. עולם הבא; lit. "The world to come", often viewed as analogous to heaven). This is also mentioned in the Kabbalah, where the soul is described as breaking, like the flame of a candle lighting another: the part of the soul that ascends being pure and the "unfinished" piece being reborn.

According to Jewish teachings, Hell is not entirely physical; rather, it can be compared to a very intense feeling of shame. People are ashamed of their misdeeds and this constitutes suffering which makes up for the bad deeds. When one has so deviated from the will of God, one is said to be in Gehinnom. This is not meant to refer to some point in the future, but to the very present moment. The gates of teshuva (return) are said to be always open, and so one can align his will with that of God at any moment. Being out of alignment with God's will is itself a punishment according to the Torah.

Many scholars of Jewish mysticism, particularly of the Kabbalah, describe seven "compartments" or "habitations" of Hell, just as they describe seven divisions of heaven. These divisions go by many different names, and the most frequently mentioned are as follows:

- Sheol (Hebrew: שְׁאוֹל – "underworld", "Hades"; "grave")
- Abaddon (Hebrew: אֲבַדּוֹן – "doom", "perdition")
- Be'er Shachat (Hebrew: בְּאֵר שַׁחַת, Be'er Shachath – "pit of corruption")
- Tit ha-Yaven (Hebrew: טִיט הַיָוֵן – "clinging mud")
- Sha'are Mavet (Hebrew: שַׁעֲרֵי מָוֶת, Sha'arei Maveth – "gates of death")
- Tzalmavet (Hebrew: צַלמָוֶת, Tsalmaveth – "shadow of death")
- Gehinnom (Hebrew: גֵיהִנוֹם, Gehinnom – "valley of Hinnom"; "Tartarus", "Purgatory")

Besides those mentioned above, there also exist additional terms that have been often used to either refer to Hell in general or to some region of the underworld:

- Azazel (Hebrew: עֲזָאזֵל, compd. of ez עֵז: "goat" + azal אָזַל: "to go away" – "goat of departure", "scapegoat"; "entire removal", "damnation")
- Dudael (Hebrew: דּוּדָאֵל – lit. "cauldron of God")
- Tehom (Hebrew: תְהוֹם – "abyss"; "sea", "deep ocean")
- Tophet (Hebrew: תֹּפֶת or תוֹפֶת, Topheth – "fire-place", "place of burning", "place to be spit upon"; "inferno")
- Tzoah Rotachat (Hebrew: צוֹאָה רוֹתֵחַת, Tsoah Rothachath – "boiling excrement")
- Mashchit (Hebrew: מַשְׁחִית, Mashchith – "destruction", "ruin")
- Dumah (Hebrew: דוּמָה – "silence")
- Neshiyyah (Hebrew: נְשִׁיָּה – "oblivion", "Limbo")
- Bor Shaon (Hebrew: בּוֹר שָׁאוֹן – "cistern of sound")
- Eretz Tachtit (Hebrew: אֶרֶץ תַּחְתִּית, Erets Tachtith – "lowest earth").
- Masak Mavdil (Hebrew: מָסָך מַבְדִּ֔יל, Masak Mabdil – "dividing curtain")
- Haguel (Ethiopic: ሀጉለ – "(place of) destruction", "loss", "waste")
- Ikisat (Ethiopic: አክይስት – "serpents", "dragons"; "place of future punishment")

Maimonides declares in his 13 principles of faith that the hells of the rabbinic literature were pedagogically motivated inventions to encourage respect of the Torah commandments by mankind, which had been regarded as immature. Instead of being sent to hell, the souls of the wicked would actually get annihilated.

=== Christianity ===
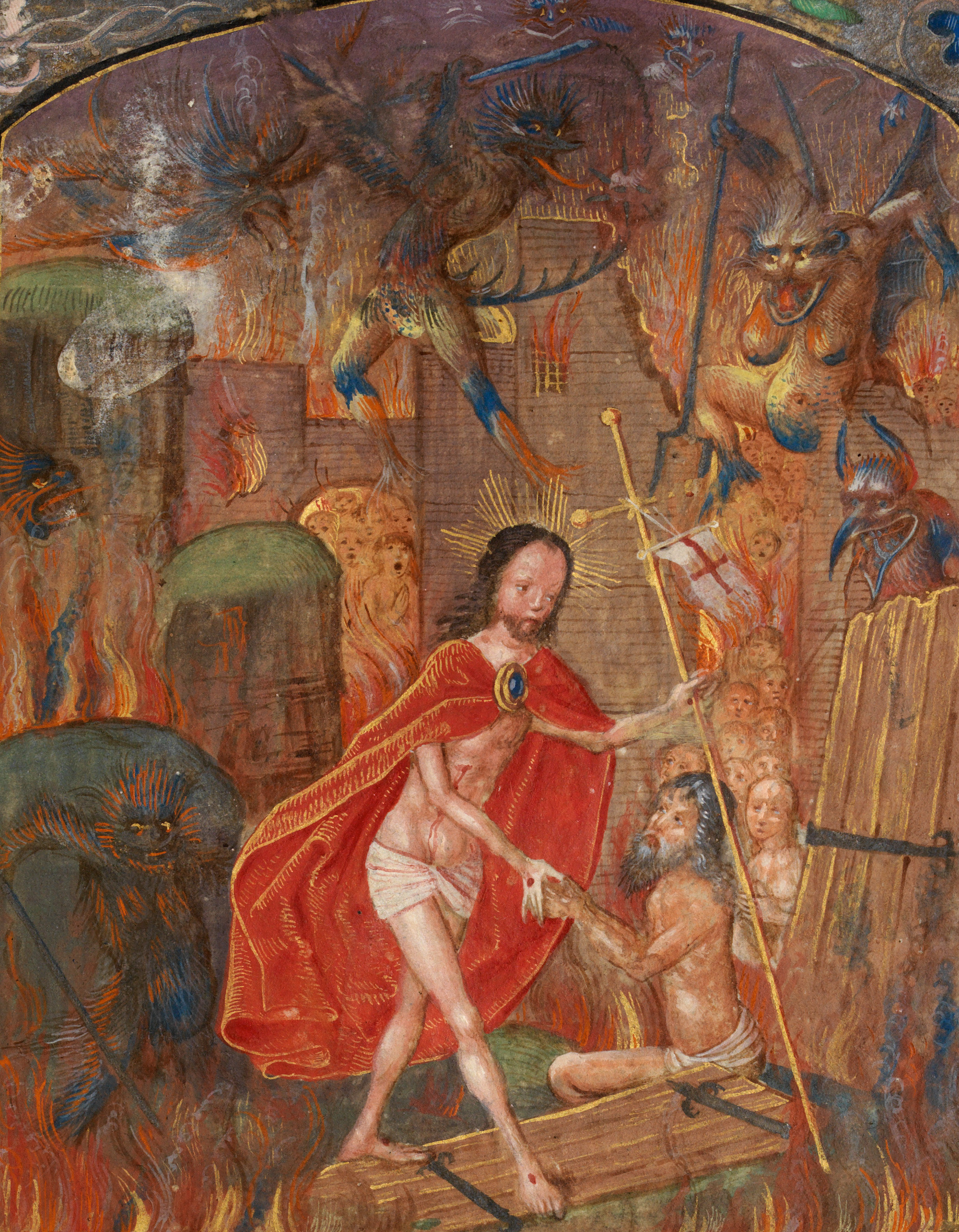
Harrowing of Hell. Christ leads Adam by the hand, c.1504

The Christian doctrine of hell derives from passages in the New Testament. The English word hell does not appear in the Greek New Testament; instead one of three words is used: the Greek words Tartarus or Hades, or the Hebrew word Gehinnom.

In the Septuagint and New Testament, the authors used the Greek term Hades for the Hebrew Sheol, but often with Jewish rather than Greek concepts in mind. In the Jewish concept of Sheol, such as expressed in Ecclesiastes, Sheol or Hades is a place where there is no activity. However, since Augustine, some Christians have believed that the souls of those who die either rest peacefully, in the case of Christians, or are afflicted, in the case of the damned, after death until the resurrection.

Hebrew OT	Septuagint	Greek NT	times in NT	Vulgate	KJV	NIV
שְׁאוֹל (Sheol)	Ἅιδης (Haïdēs)	ᾌδης (Ádēs)	x10	infernus	Hell	Hades
גֵיא בֶן־הִנֹּם (Ge Hinom)	Εννομ (Ennom)	γέεννα (géenna)	x11	gehennae/gehennam	Hell	Hell
(Not applicable)	(Not applicable)	Ταρταρόω (Tartaróō)	x1	tartarum	Hell	Hell

While these three terms are translated in the KJV as "hell", they have three very different meanings.

- Hades has similarities to the Old Testament term, Sheol as "the place of the dead" or "grave". Thus, it is used in reference to both the righteous and the wicked, since both wind up there eventually.
- Gehenna was a place that contained a dump where people burned their garbage. Bodies of those deemed to have died in sin without hope of salvation (such as people who committed suicide) were thrown there to be destroyed. Gehenna is used in the New Testament as a metaphor for the final place of punishment for the wicked after the resurrection.
- Tartaróō (the verb "throw to Tartarus", used of the fall of the Titans in a scholium on Iliad 14.296) occurs only once in the New Testament in II Peter 2:4, where it is parallel to the use of the noun form in 1 Enoch as the place of incarceration of the fallen angels. It mentions nothing about human souls being sent there in the afterlife.

According to the Roman Catholic Church, the Council of Trent taught, in the 5th canon of its 14th session, that damnation is eternal: "...the loss of eternal blessedness, and the eternal damnation which he has incurred..."

The Catholic Church defines hell as "a state of definitive self-exclusion from communion with God and the blessed". One finds oneself in hell as the result of dying in mortal sin without repenting and accepting God's merciful love, becoming eternally separated from him by one's own free choice immediately after death. In the Roman Catholic Church, many other Christian churches, such as the Methodists, Baptists and Episcopalians, and some Greek Orthodox churches, hell is taught as the final destiny of those who have not been found worthy after the general resurrection and last judgment, where they will be permanently separated from God. The nature of this judgment is inconsistent with many Protestant churches teaching the saving comes from accepting Jesus Christ as their savior, while the Greek Orthodox and Catholic Churches teach that the judgment hinges on both faith and works. However, many Liberal Christians throughout Mainline Protestant churches believe in universal reconciliation. Regarding the belief in hell, the interpretation of Extra Ecclesiam nulla salus is also relevant.

Some Christian theologians subscribe to the doctrines of conditional immortality. Conditional immortality is the belief that the soul dies with the body and does not live again until the resurrection. As with other Jewish writings of the Second Temple period, the New Testament text distinguishes two words, both translated "hell" in older English Bibles: Hades, "the grave", and Gehenna where God "can destroy both body and soul". Some Christians read this to mean that neither Hades nor Gehenna are eternal but refer to the ultimate destruction of the wicked in the lake of fire after resurrection. However, because of the Greek words used in translating from the Hebrew text, the Hebrew ideas have become confused with Greek myths and ideas. In the Hebrew text when people died they went to Sheol, the grave and the wicked ultimately went to Gehenna and were consumed by fire. The Hebrew words for "the grave" or "death" were translated using Greek words and later texts became a mix of mistranslation, pagan influence, and Greek myth.

Christian mortalism is the doctrine that all men and women, including Christians, must die, and do not continue and are not conscious after death. Therefore, annihilationism includes the doctrine that "the wicked" are also destroyed. Christian mortalism and annihilationism are directly related to the doctrine of conditional immortality, the idea that a human soul is not immortal unless it is given eternal life at the second coming of Christ and resurrection of the dead.

Biblical scholars looking at the issue through the Hebrew text have denied the teaching of innate immortality. Rejection of the immortality of the soul, and advocacy of Christian mortalism, was a feature of Protestantism since the early days of the Reformation with Martin Luther himself rejecting the traditional idea, though his mortalism did not carry into orthodox Lutheranism. One of the most notable English opponents of the immortality of the soul was Thomas Hobbes who describes the idea as a Greek "contagion" in Christian doctrine. Modern proponents of conditional immortality include some in the Anglican church such as N. T. Wright and as denominations the Seventh-day Adventists, Bible Students, Jehovah's Witnesses, Christadelphians, Living Church of God, Church of God International, and some other Protestant Christians. The Catholic Catechism states "The souls of sinners descend into hell, where they suffer 'eternal fire'". However, Cardinal Vincent Nichols, the most senior Catholic in England and Wales, said "there's nowhere in Catholic teaching that actually says any one person is in hell". The 1993 Catechism of the Catholic Church states: "This state of definitive self-exclusion from communion with God and the blessed is called 'hell'" and "they suffer the punishments of hell, 'eternal fire'". The chief punishment of hell is eternal separation from God" (CCC 1035). During an Audience in 1999, Pope John Paul II commented: "images of hell that Sacred Scripture presents to us must be correctly interpreted. They show the complete frustration and emptiness of life without God. Rather than a place, hell indicates the state of those who freely and definitively separate themselves from God, the source of all life and joy."

==== Other denominations ====
- The Seventh-day Adventist Church's official beliefs support annihilationism. They deny the Catholic purgatory and teach that the dead lie in the grave until they are raised for a last judgment, both the righteous and wicked await the resurrection at the Second Coming. Seventh-day Adventists believe that death is a state of unconscious sleep until the resurrection.
- Jehovah's Witnesses hold that the soul ceases to exist when the person dies and therefore that hell (Sheol or Hades) is a state of non-existence. In their theology, Gehenna differs from Sheol or Hades in that it holds no hope of a resurrection.
- Christadelphians believe that the wicked will have no conscious existence after death.
- Bible Students also believe in annihilationism.
- Christian Universalists believe in universal reconciliation, the belief that all human souls will be eventually reconciled with God and admitted to heaven. This belief is held by some Unitarian-Universalists.
- According to Emanuel Swedenborg's Second Coming Christian revelation, hell exists because evil people want it. They, not God, introduced evil to the human race. In Swedenborgianism, every soul joins the like-minded group after death in which it feels the most comfortable. Hell is therefore believed to be a place of happiness for the souls which delight in evilness.
- Members of the Church of Jesus Christ of Latter-day Saints (LDS Church) teach that hell is a state between death and resurrection, in which those spirits who did not repent while on earth must suffer for their own sins (Doctrine and Covenants 19:15–17). After that, only the Sons of perdition, who committed the Eternal sin, would be cast into Outer darkness. However, according to Mormon faith, committing the Eternal sin requires so much knowledge that most people cannot do this.

=== Islam ===
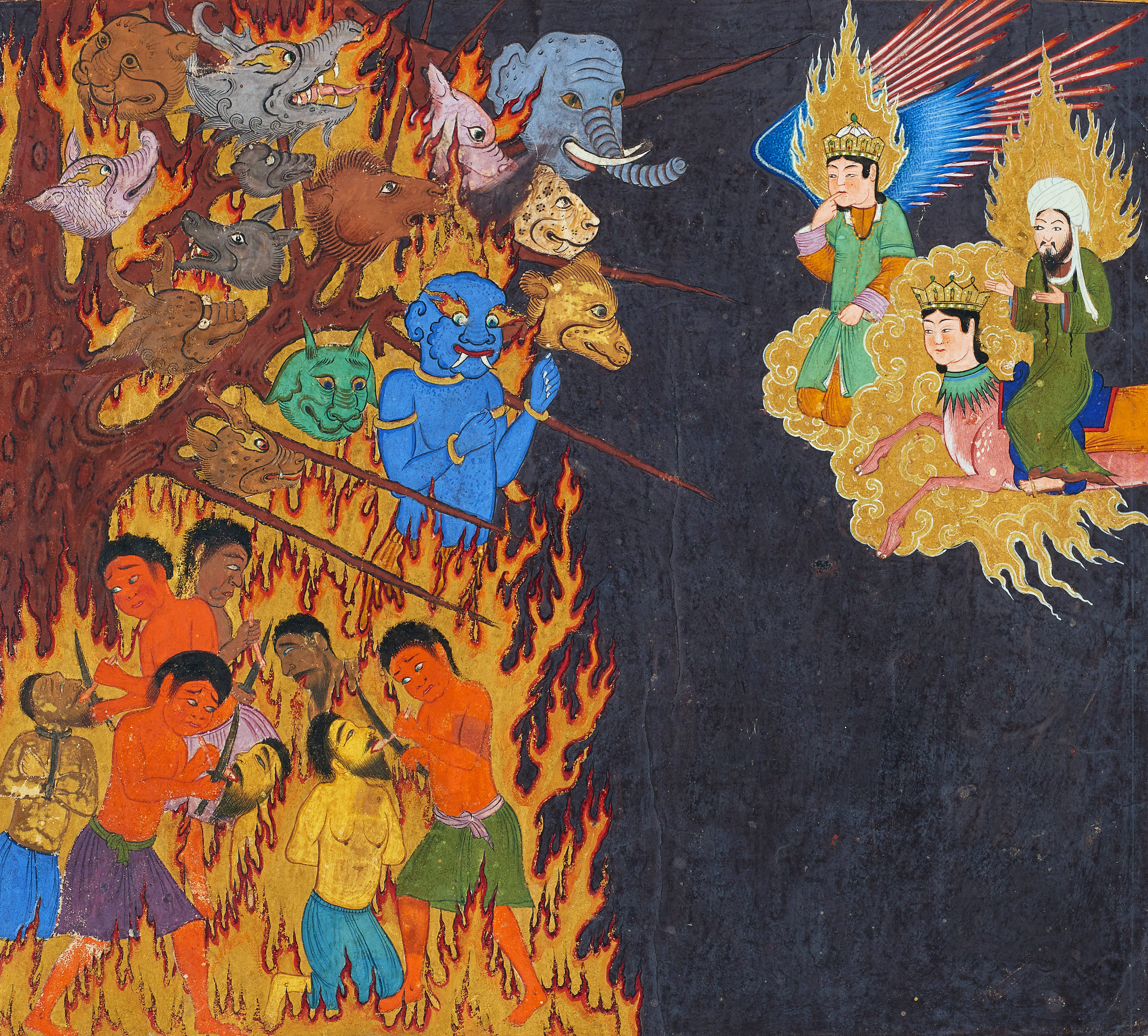
Islamic miniature of Muhammad visiting Zaqqum, a tree in Hell, whose dwellers are compelled to eat the bitter fruit for eternity.

In Islam, Jahannam (in Arabic: جهنم) (related to the Hebrew word gehinnom) is the counterpart to heaven and likewise divided into seven layers, both co-existing with the temporal world, filled with blazing fire, boiling water, and a variety of other torments. In the Quran, God declares that the Jahannam is prepared for both mankind and jinn. After the Day of Judgment, it is to be occupied by those who do not believe in God, those who have disobeyed his laws, or rejected his messengers. "Enemies of Islam" are sent to hell immediately upon their deaths. Muslim modernists downplay the vivid descriptions of Hell common during Classical period, on one hand reaffirming that the afterlife must not be denied, but simultaneously asserting its exact nature remains unknown. Other modern Muslims continue the line of Sufism as an interiorized hell, combining the eschatological thoughts of Ibn Arabi and Rumi with Western philosophy. There is belief that the fire which represents the own bad deeds can already be seen during the Punishment of the Grave, and that the spiritual pain caused by this can lead to purification of the soul. Not all Muslims and scholars agree whether Hell is eternal or whether all of the condemned will eventually be forgiven and allowed to enter paradise.

Over Hell, a narrow bridge called As-Sirāt is spanned. On Judgment Day one must pass over it to reach paradise, but those destined for Hell will find too narrow and fall into their new abode. Iblis, the temporary ruler of Hell, is thought of residing in the bottom of Hell, from where he commands his hosts of infernal demons. But contrary to Christian traditions, Iblis and his infernal hosts do not wage war against God, his enmity applies against humanity only. Further, his dominion in Hell is also his punishment. Executioners of punishment are the 19 zabaniyya, who have been created from the fires of Hell.

The seven gates of jahannam, mentioned in the Quran, inspired Muslim exegetes (tafsir) to develop a system of seven stages of Hell, analogous to the seven doors of paradise. The stages of Hell get their names by seven different terms used for Hell throughout the Quran, each assigned for a different type of sinners. The concept later accepted by Sunni authorities list the levels of Hell as follows, although some stages may vary:

1. Jahannam (جهنم Gehenna)
2. Laza (لظى fierce blaze)
3. Hutama (حُطَمَة crushing fire)
4. Sa'ir (سعير raging fire)
5. Saqar (سقر scorching fire)
6. Jahim (جحيم furnace)
7. Hawiya (هاوية infernal abyss)

The lowest level is for the hypocrites (hawiyah), who claimed aloud to believe in God and his messenger but in their hearts did not.

Although the earliest reports about Muhammad's journey through the heavens, do not locate Hell in the heavens, only brief references about visiting Hell during the journey appears. But extensive accounts about Muhammad's night journey, in the non-canonical but popular Miraj-Literature, tell about encountering the angels of Hell. Malik, the keeper to the gates of Hell, namely appears in Ibn Abbas' Isra and Mi'raj. The doors to Hell are either in the third or fifth heaven, or in a heaven close God's throne, or directly after entering heaven, whereupon Muhammad requests a glaze at hell. Ibn Hisham gives extensive details about Muhammad visiting Hell and its inhabitants punished wherein. Muhammad meeting Malik, the Dajjal and hell, was used as a proof for Muhammad's Night Journey.

Medieval sources often identified Hell with the seven earths mentioned in Quran 65:12, inhabited by devils, harsh angels, scorpions, and serpents. They described thorny shrubs, seas filled with blood and fire, and darkness, only illuminated by flames. One popular concept arrange the earths as follows:

1. Adim or Ramaka (رمکا) - the surface, on which humans, animals and jinn live.
2. Basit or Khawfa (خوفا)
3. Thaqil or 'Arafa (عرفه) - antechamber
4. Batih or Hadna (حدنه) - a valley with stream of boiling sulfur.
5. Hayn or Dama (دمَا)
6. Sijjin, (سجىن dungeon or prison) or Masika (sometimes, Sijjin is at the bottom) - Quran 83:7
7. Nar as-Samum, Zamhareer or As-Saqar / Athara, or Hanina (حنينا) - venomous wind of fire and a cold wind of ice.

=== Baháʼí Faith ===
In the Baháʼí Faith, the conventional descriptions of hell and heaven are considered to be symbolic representations of spiritual conditions. The Baháʼí writings describe closeness to God to be heaven, and conversely, remoteness from God as hell. The Baháʼí writings state that the soul is immortal and after death it will continue to progress until it finally attains God's presence.

=== Buddhism ===
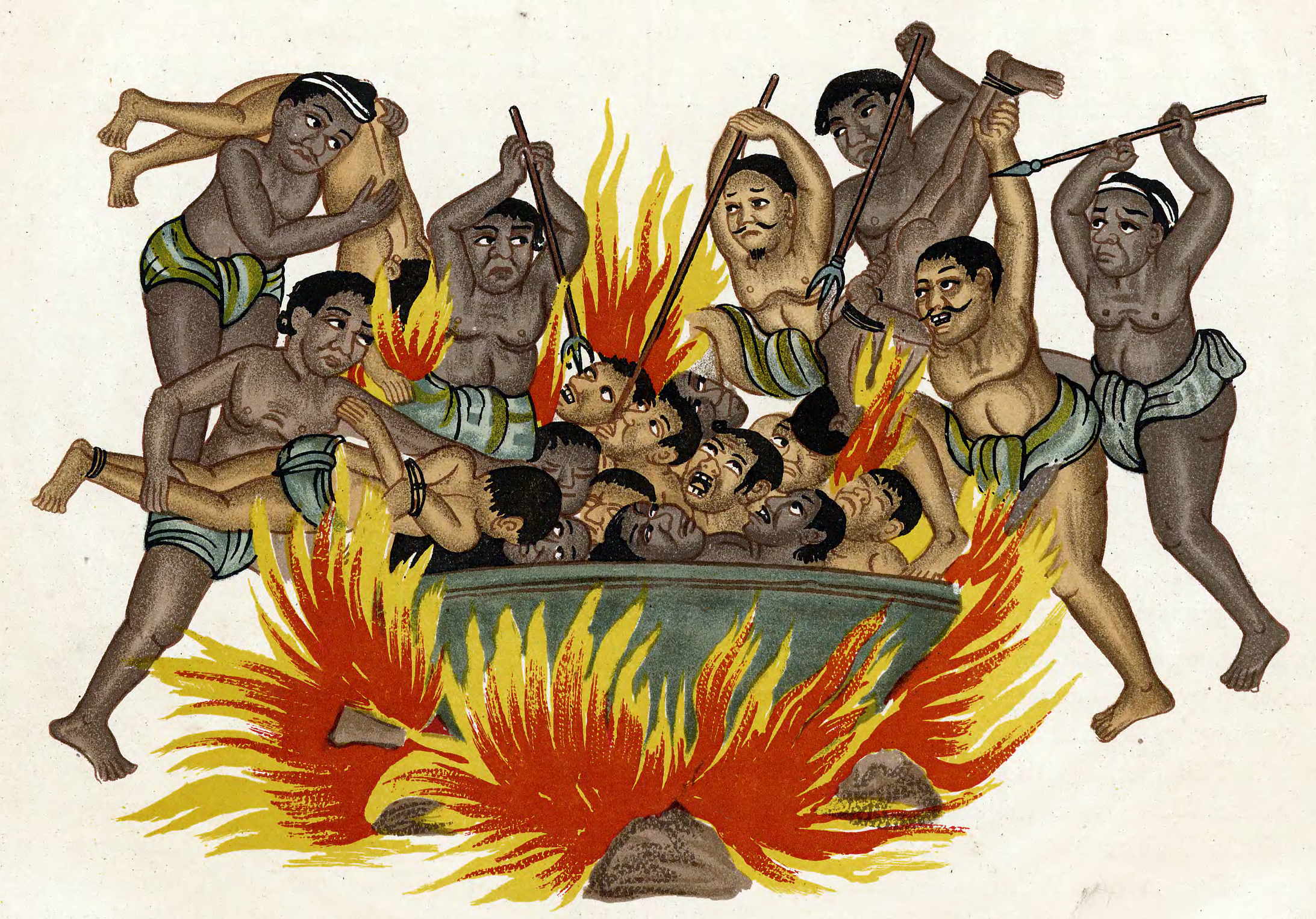
Naraka in the Burmese representation

In "Devaduta Sutta", the 130th discourse of the Majjhima Nikaya, Buddha teaches about hell in vivid detail. Buddhism teaches that there are five or six realms of rebirth, which can then be further subdivided into degrees of agony or pleasure.) Of these realms, the hell realms, or Naraka, is the lowest realm of rebirth. Of the hell realms, the worst is Avīci (Sanskrit and Pali for "without waves"). The Buddha's disciple, Devadatta, who tried to kill the Buddha on three occasions, as well as create a schism in the monastic order, is said to have been reborn in the Avici hell.

Like all realms of rebirth in Buddhism, rebirth in the hell realms is not permanent, though suffering can persist for eons before being reborn again. In the Lotus Sutra, the Buddha teaches that eventually even Devadatta will become a Pratyekabuddha himself, emphasizing the temporary nature of the hell realms. Thus, Buddhism teaches to escape the endless migration of rebirths (both positive and negative) through the attainment of Nirvana.

The Bodhisattva Ksitigarbha, according to the Ksitigarbha Sutra, made a great vow as a young girl to not reach Nirvana until all beings were liberated from the hell realms or other unwholesome rebirths. In popular literature, Ksitigarbha travels to the hell realms to teach and relieve beings of their suffering.

=== Hinduism ===
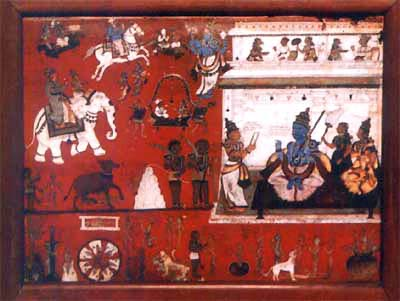
Yama's Court and Hell. The Blue figure is Yamaraja (The Hindu god of death) with his consort Yami and Chitragupta 17th-century painting from Government Museum, Chennai.

Early Vedic religion does not have a concept of hell. The Rigveda mentions three realms, bhūr (the earth), svar (the sky) and bhuvas or antarikṣa (the middle area, i.e. air or atmosphere). In later Hindu literature, especially the law books and the Puranas, more realms are mentioned, including a realm similar to hell, called Naraka. Yama as the first born human (together with his twin sister Yamī), by virtue of precedence, becomes ruler of men and a judge on their departure.

In the law-books (the Smritis and the Dharmashashtras), Naraka is a place of punishment for misdeeds. It is a lower spiritual plane (called naraka-loka) where the spirit is judged and the partial fruits of karma affect the next life. In the Mahabharata, there is a mention of the Pandavas and the Kauravas both going to heaven. At first Yudhishthira goes to heaven, where he sees Duryodhana enjoying the realm; Indra tells him that Duryodhana is in heaven as he had adequately performed his Kshatriya duties. Then he shows Yudhishthira hell, where it appears his brothers are. Later it is revealed that this was a test for Yudhishthira and that his brothers and the Kauravas are all in heaven, and live happily in the divine abode of the devas. Various hells are also described in various Puranas and other scriptures. The Garuda Purana gives a detailed account of each hell and its features; it lists the amount of punishment for most crimes, much like a modern-day penal code.

It is believed that people who commit misdeeds go to hell and have to go through punishments in accordance with the misdeeds they committed. The god Yama, who is also the god of death, presides over hell. Detailed accounts of all the misdeeds committed by an individual are kept by Chitragupta, who is the record keeper in Yama's court. Chitragupta reads out the misdeeds committed and Yama orders appropriate punishments to be given to individuals. These punishments include dipping in boiling oil, burning in fire, torture using various weapons, etc. in various hells. Individuals who finish their quota of the punishments are reborn in accordance with their balance of karma. All created beings are imperfect and thus have at least one misdeed to their record; but if one has generally led a meritorious life, one ascends to Svarga, a temporary realm of enjoyment similar to Paradise, after a brief period of expiation in hell and before the next reincarnation, according to the law of karma. With the exception of Hindu philosopher Madhva, time in hell is not regarded as eternal damnation within Hinduism.

According to Brahma Kumaris, the Iron Age (Kali Yuga) is regarded as hell.

=== Jainism ===
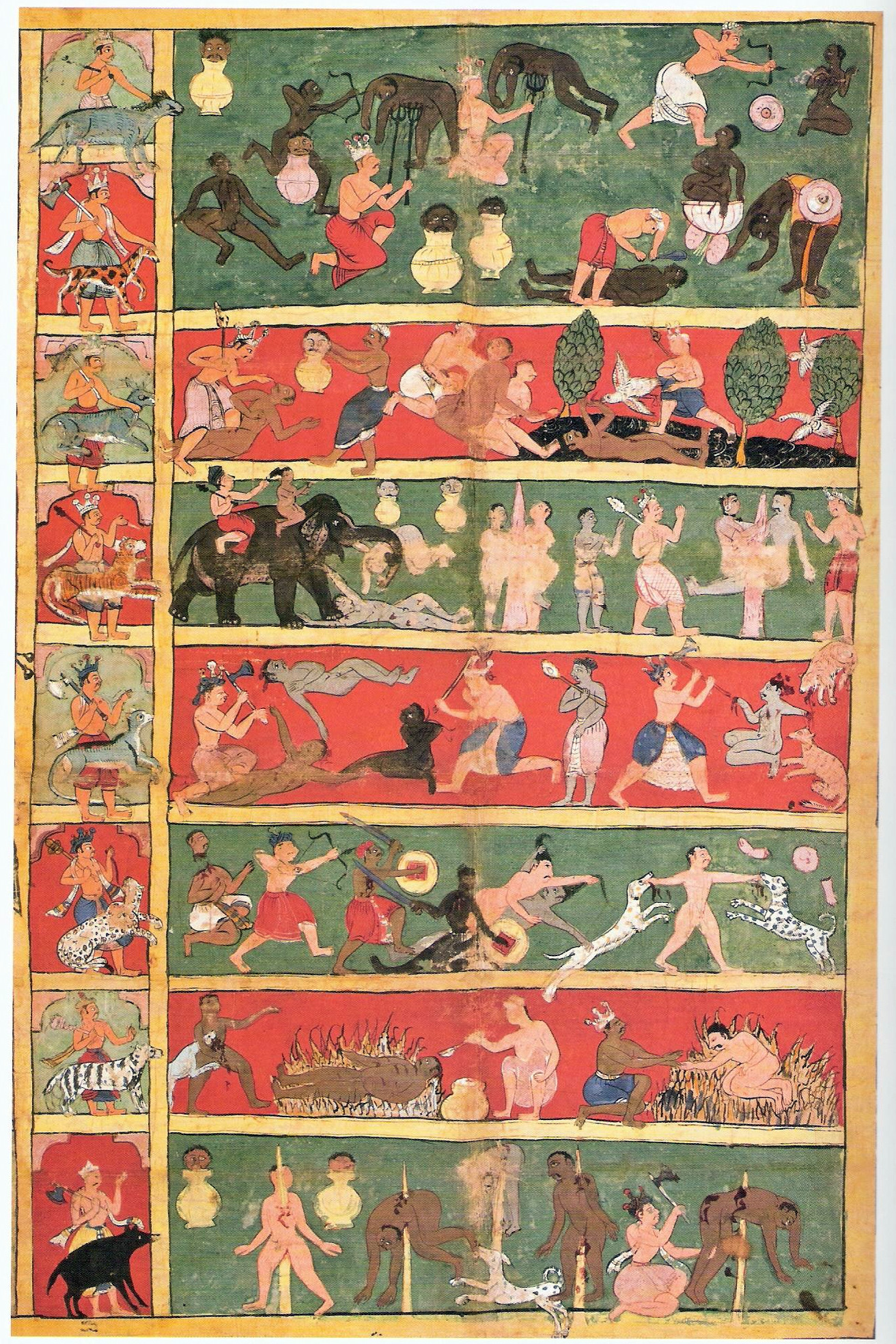
17th-century cloth painting depicting seven levels of Jain Hell and various tortures suffered in them. Left panel depicts the demi-god and his animal vehicle presiding over each Hell.

In Jain cosmology, Naraka (translated as hell) is the name given to realm of existence having great suffering. However, a Naraka differs from the hells of Abrahamic religions as souls are not sent to Naraka as the result of a divine judgment and punishment. Furthermore, length of a being's stay in a Naraka is not eternal, though it is usually very long and measured in billions of years. A soul is born into a Naraka as a direct result of his or her previous karma (actions of body, speech and mind), and resides there for a finite length of time until his karma has achieved its full result. After his karma is used up, he may be reborn in one of the higher worlds as the result of an earlier karma that had not yet ripened.

The hells are situated in the seven grounds at the lower part of the universe. The hellish beings are a type of souls which are residing in these various hells. They are born in hells by sudden manifestation. The hellish beings possess vaikriya body (protean body which can transform itself and take various forms). They have a fixed life span (ranging from ten thousand to billions of years) in the respective hells where they reside. According to Jain scripture, Tattvarthasutra, following are the causes for birth in hell:

1. Killing or causing pain with intense passion
2. Excessive attachment to things and worldly pleasure with constantly indulging in cruel and violent acts
3. Vowless and unrestrained life

=== Meivazhi ===
According to Meivazhi, the purpose of all religions is to guide people to heaven. However, those who do not approach God and are not blessed by Him are believed to be condemned to hell.

=== Sikhism ===
In Sikh thought, heaven and hell are not places for living hereafter, they are part of spiritual topography of man and do not exist otherwise. They refer to good and evil stages of life respectively and can be lived now and here during our earthly existence. For example, Guru Arjan explains that people who are entangled in emotional attachment and doubt are living in hell on this Earth i.e. their life is hellish.

So many are being drowned in emotional attachment and doubt; they dwell in the most horrible hell.

— Guru Arjan, Guru Granth Sahib 297

=== Taoism ===
Ancient Taoism had no concept of hell, as morality was seen to be a man-made distinction and there was no concept of an immaterial soul. In its home country China, where Taoism adopted tenets of other religions, popular belief endows Taoist hell with many deities and spirits who punish sin in a variety of horrible ways.

Buddhist hells became "so much a part of [many Daoist sects] that during funeral services[,] the priests hang up scrolls depicting" similar scenes. Typically, Daoist hells are "said to be ten in number" and "are sometimes said to be situated under a high mountain in Sichuan". "Each is ruled by a king serving as judge, surrounded by ministers and attendants who carry out his decisions." Punishment is usually "inflicted with the use of torture instruments", although there are some non-physical and more metaphysical punishments. However, this type of Daoist hell is usually not final and a soul will make a journey of refining by going through at least several hells and their punishments until it is reincarnated into another body in the human world.

=== Chinese traditional and syncretic religion ===
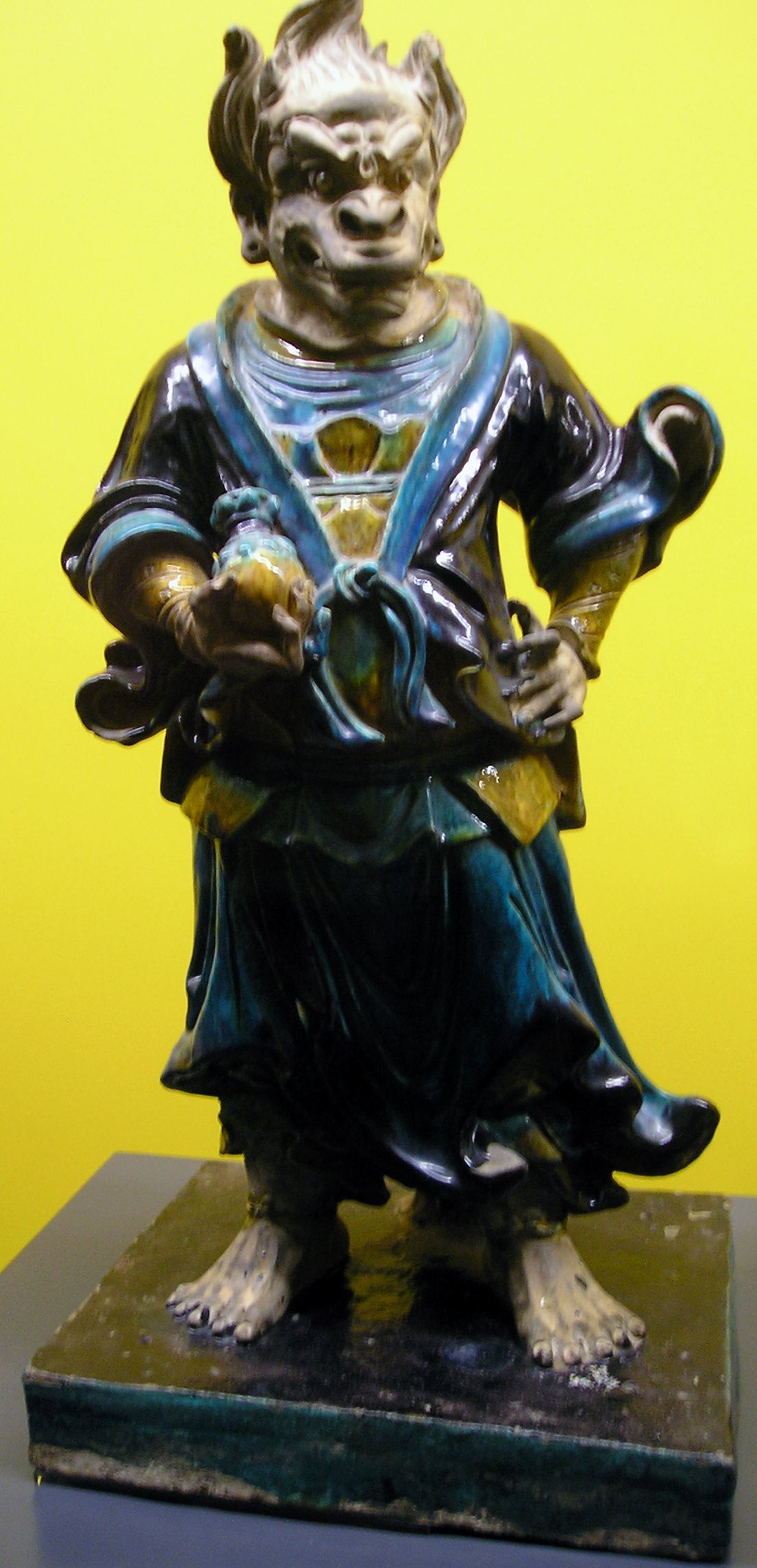
A Chinese glazed earthenware sculpture of "Hell's torturer", 16th century, Ming Dynasty

Diyu is the realm of the dead in Chinese mythology. It is very loosely based upon the Buddhist concept of Naraka combined with traditional Chinese afterlife beliefs and a variety of popular expansions and re-interpretations of these two traditions. Ruled by Yanluo Wang, the King of hell, Diyu is a maze of underground levels and chambers where souls are taken to atone for their earthly sins.

Incorporating ideas from Taoism and Buddhism as well as traditional Chinese folk religion, Diyu is a kind of purgatory place which serves not only to punish but also to renew spirits ready for their next incarnation. There are many deities associated with the place, whose names and purposes are the subject of much conflicting information.

The exact number of levels in Chinese hell – and their associated deities – differs according to the Buddhist or Taoist perception. Some speak of three to four 'Courts', other as many as ten. The ten judges are also known as the 10 Kings of Yama. Each Court deals with a different aspect of atonement. For example, murder is punished in one Court, adultery in another. According to some Chinese legends, there are eighteen levels in hell. Punishment also varies according to belief, but most legends speak of highly imaginative chambers where wrong-doers are sawn in half, beheaded, thrown into pits of filth or forced to climb trees adorned with sharp blades.

However, most legends agree that once a soul (usually referred to as a 'ghost') has atoned for their deeds and repented, he or she is given the Drink of Forgetfulness by Meng Po and sent back into the world to be reborn, possibly as an animal or a poor or sick person, for further punishment.

=== Zoroastrianism ===
Zoroastrianism has historically suggested several possible fates for the wicked, including annihilation, purgation in molten metal, and eternal punishment, all of which have standing in Zoroaster's writings. Zoroastrian eschatology includes the belief that wicked souls will remain in Duzakh until, following the arrival of three saviors at thousand-year intervals, Ahura Mazda reconciles the world, destroying evil and resurrecting tormented souls to perfection.

The sacred Gathas mention a "House of the Lie″ for those "that are of an evil dominion, of evil deeds, evil words, evil Self, and evil thought, Liars". However, the best-known Zoroastrian text to describe hell in detail is the Book of Arda Viraf. It depicts particular punishments for particular sins—for instance, being trampled by cattle as punishment for neglecting the needs of work animals. Other descriptions can be found in the Book of Scriptures (Hadhokht Nask), Religious Judgments (Dadestan-i Denig) and the Spirit of Wisdom (Menog-i Khrad).

=== Mandaeism ===
The Mandaeans believe in purification of souls inside of Leviathan, whom they also call Ur. Within detention houses, so called Matartas, the detained souls would receive so much punishment that they would wish to die a Second death, which would, however, not (yet) befall their spirit. At the end of days, the souls of the Mandaeans which could be purified, would be liberated out of Ur's mouth. After this, Ur would get destroyed along with the souls remaining inside him, so they die the second death.

=== Wicca ===
The Gardnerian Wicca and Alexandrian Wicca sects of Wicca include "wiccan laws" that Gerald Gardner wrote, which state that wiccan souls are privileged with reincarnation, but that the souls of wiccans who break the wiccan laws, "even under torture", would be cursed by the goddess, never be reborn on earth, and "remain where they belong, in the Hell of the Christians". Other recognized wiccan sects do not include Gerald Gardner's "wiccan laws". The influential wiccan author Raymond Buckland wrote that the wiccan laws are unimportant. Solitary wiccans, not involved in organized sects, do not include the wiccan laws in their doctrine.

== In literature ==
In his Divina commedia (Divine Comedy), set in the year 1300, Dante Alighieri employed the concept of taking Virgil as his guide through Inferno (and then, in the second canticle, up the mountain of Purgatorio). Virgil himself is not condemned to hell proper in Dante's poem but is rather, as a virtuous pagan, confined to Limbo just at the edge of hell. The geography of hell is very elaborately laid out in this work, with nine concentric rings leading deeper into Earth, and deeper into the various punishments of hell, until, at the center of the world, Dante finds Satan himself trapped in the frozen lake of Cocytus. A small tunnel leads past Satan and out to the other side of the world, at the base of the Mount of Purgatory.

John Milton's Paradise Lost (1667) opens with the fallen angels, including their leader Satan, waking up in hell after having been defeated in the war in heaven and the action returns there at several points throughout the poem. Milton portrays hell as the abode of the demons, and the passive prison from which they plot their revenge upon heaven through the corruption of the human race. 19th-century French poet Arthur Rimbaud alluded to the concept as well in the title and themes of one of his major works, A Season in Hell (1873). Rimbaud's poetry portrays his own suffering in a poetic form as well as other themes. Many of the great epics of European literature include episodes that occur in hell. In the Roman poet Virgil's Latin epic, the Aeneid, Aeneas descends into Dis (the underworld) to visit his father's spirit. The underworld is only vaguely described, with one unexplored path leading to the punishments of Tartarus, while the other leads through Erebus and the Elysian Fields.

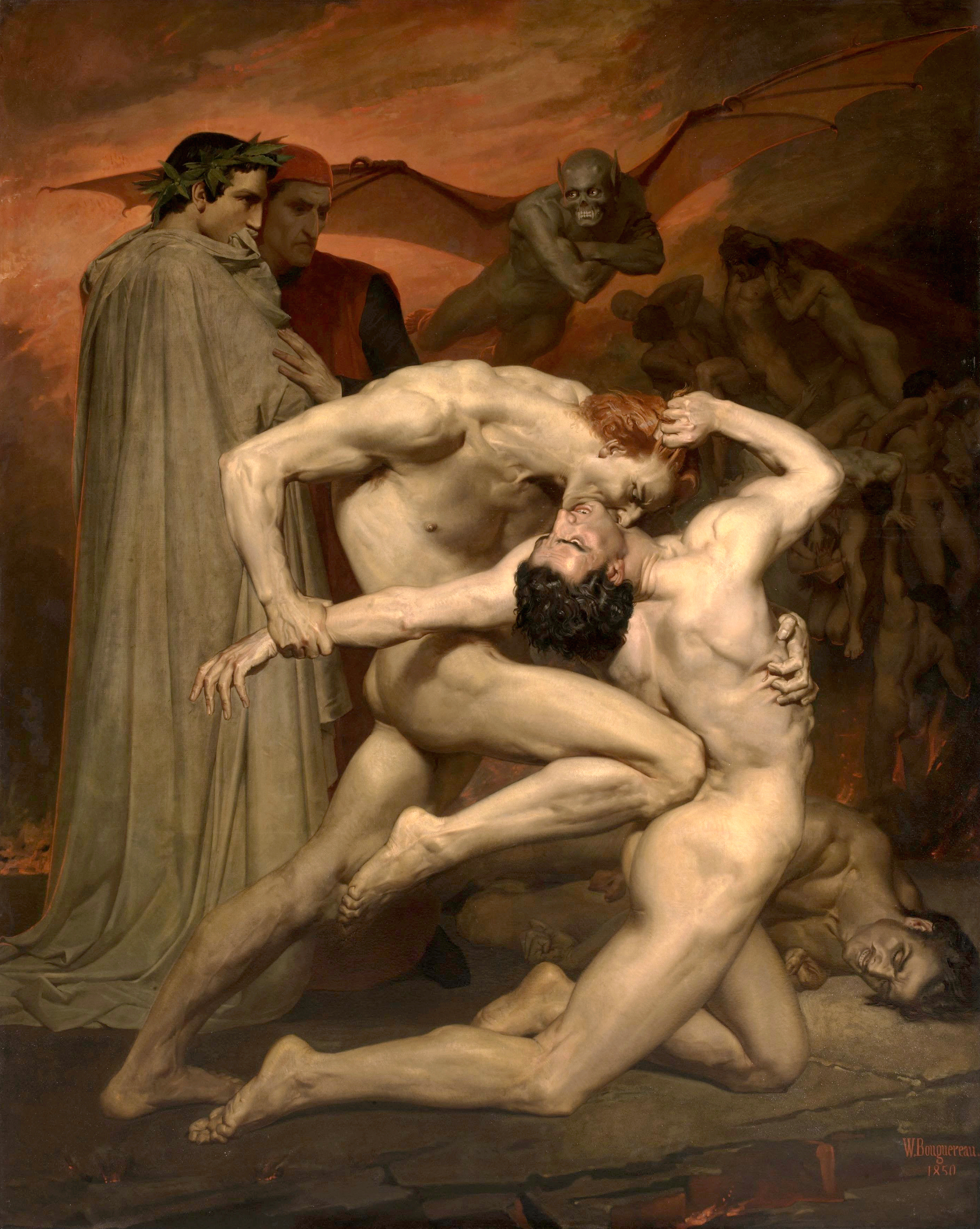
Dante and Virgil in Hell by William-Adolphe Bouguereau, 1850

The idea of hell was highly influential to writers such as Jean-Paul Sartre who authored the 1944 play No Exit about the idea that "Hell is other people". Although not a religious man, Sartre was fascinated by his interpretation of a hellish state of suffering. C.S. Lewis's The Great Divorce (1945) borrows its title from William Blake's Marriage of Heaven and Hell (1793) and its inspiration from the Divine Comedy as the narrator is likewise guided through hell and heaven. Hell is portrayed here as an endless, desolate twilight city upon which night is imperceptibly sinking. The night is actually the Apocalypse, and it heralds the arrival of the demons after their judgment. Before the night comes, anyone can escape hell if they leave behind their former selves and accept Heaven's offer, and a journey to heaven reveals that hell is infinitely small; it is nothing more or less than what happens to a soul that turns away from God and into itself.

== See also ==
- Allegory of the long spoons
- Divine retribution – Supernatural punishment by a deity
- Problem of Hell – Ethical problem in religion
- The Well to Hell hoax – Urban legend regarding borehole in Russia
