= Pond of Abundance =

Pond or river in Paradise in Islam

Diagram of Plain of Assembly on Judgment Day, by Ibn Arabi (ca. 1238) with the Throne of God, pulpits for the righteous, seven rows of angels, Gabriel, the Barrier, the Pond of Abundance, the Praiseworthy Station where Muhammad will stand, the Scale, the Bridge, Hell, and the Meadow of Paradise.

In Islam, the Pond of Abundance or Pool of Kawthar (Arabic: حَوْضُ ٱلْكَوْثَرِ, romanized: Ḥawḍ al-Kawthar) refers to a pond or river that exists in Paradise. The traditional Muslim belief is that on the Day of Judgement, when people will be resurrected, they will rise in great thirst and be eager to quench it in an atmosphere of chaos. Then, Muhammad would be the one privileged by God to respond to the pleas of believers to quench their thirst by offering them a cool and refreshing drink from the pond.

== Origin of the concept ==
The Quran refers to the situation in Surah Al-Kawthar, but several exegetes maintain that the reference in the Surah is to the general abundance granted to Muhammad. In any case, the concept has come to be identified with the special reverence for Muhammad in comparison to other Prophets and Messengers of God.

This concept also exists in Christianity in John 7:37–38.

On the last day of the festival, the great day, while Jesus was standing there, he cried out, “Let anyone who is thirsty come to me, and let the one who believes in me drink. As the scripture has said, ‘Out of the believer’s heart shall flow rivers of living water.’”.

== Implications ==
The pond's general implication is that it motivates Muslims to be conscious of the Day of Judgement and its severity and accordingly to plan to improve their afterlife. It also motivates them towards love of Muhammad and promoting the view that the events around the Day of Judgement require belief in the unseen and are highly metaphysical in nature.

== See also ==
- Islamic view of the Last Judgment (Akhirah)
- Islamic eschatology (Qiyamah)
