= Sirah =

Sirah is a word meaning 'head' in Arabic, Sundanese and Javanese. It may refer to:

- Sirah (rapper), American rapper
- Sirah, Alborz, a village in Alborz Province, Iran
- Sirah, Khuzestan, a village in Khuzestan Province, Iran
- Sīrah, the traditional biographies of the Islamic prophet Muhammad
- Sīrah shaʿbiyyah, an Arabic term used for popular epics
- Durif (also known as Petite Sirah), a variety of red wine grape primarily grown in California
- Sirah, a character in "The Storyteller", an episode of Star Trek: Deep Space Nine

== See also ==
- Sira (disambiguation)
- Sirrah (disambiguation)
- Syrah (also known as shiraz), a grape variety used for red wine
