= Brig of Dread =

Mythological bridge in English folklore

Brig of Dread or Bridge of Dread is a bridge to Purgatory that a dead soul had to cross. Evil souls fall from the bridge into hell. This is a common afterlife theme found in some form or other in many cultures, such as the Chinvat Bridge of Zoroastrianism and As-Sirāt of Islam.

The "Brig o' Dread" is an important element in The Lyke-Wake Dirge, an old Northern English waking song.

Elements of the Lyke-Wake Dirge bear resemblance to concepts of the afterlife found in Germanic cosmology. The "Brig o' Dread" is possibly related to the bridge Bifröst (which probably means "trembling-way"), spanning the divide between the world of humans and the world of gods, or the Gjallarbrú, which spans the river Gjøll ('resounding' or 'noisy', English cognate yell) and which may be the symbolism here rather than the Christian later folk-etymological explanation.
