= Sira =

Sira may refer to:

== People ==
- Puneet Sira (fl. from 1977), British and Bollywood film director and producer
- Sira Diop (1929–2013), Malian educator, feminist and trade unionist
- Sira Jenjaka (born 1964), Thai politician
- Sira Rego (born 1973), Spanish politician
- Sira Sylla (born 1980), French politician

== Places ==
- Sirá, Czech Republic
- Sira Subah, a historical Mughal province in southern India
  - Sira Taluk, a subdistrict
    - Sira, Karnataka, a city
- Sira, Iran
- Sira, Norway
- Sira (river), in Norway

== Religion ==
- Sīrah, traditional biographies of Muhammad written by Muslim historians
- Sīra shaʿbiyya, a genre in Islamic literature
- Sira Church, in Nesset, Norway

== Other uses ==
- Şıra, a Turkish grape drink
- Sira (film), a 2023 drama film
- Sira languages, a clade of Bantu languages
  - Sira language, or Shira, a Bantu language of Gabon
- Sira (notified body), formerly the British Scientific Instrument Research Association
- SIRA Party, a regional political party in Aceh province, Indonesia
- SirA or Uroporphyrinogen-III C-methyltransferase, an enzyme
- Section 115 Reform Act of 2006 (SIRA or S1RA), an 2006 unenacted bill in the United States

== See also ==
- Sirah (disambiguation)
- Sirat (disambiguation)
- Sura (disambiguation)
- Syrah, or Shiraz grape
- Sira Fortress, in Aden, Yemen
- SIMPLE IRA (Savings Incentive Match Plan for Employees Individual Retirement Account)
