= Sirrah =

Sirrah is an archaic term used to address inferiors, sometimes as an expression of contempt (but not as familiar). The term appears in several Shakespeare plays, such as Julius Caesar, Othello, Antony and Cleopatra, Twelfth Night and the Merchant of Venice and Titus Andronicus . It is related to "Sir", even though the social connotation of its use is opposed.

Sirrah may also refer to:

- Sirrah (band), a Polish Gothic metal band
- Sirrah, a name for the star Alpha Andromedae, also known as Sirah

== See also ==
- Sirah (disambiguation)
