= Aemilius Sura =

Ancient Roman writer

Aemilius Sura was an ancient Roman historian whose fragment "On the Years of the Roman People" (De annis populi Romani) appears in a gloss in the margin of Velleius Paterculus's Roman History. Theodor Mommsen believed that the larger work, which is now lost, was a compendium of the history of the world.

Here is Frederick W. Shipley's translation of the fragment:

The Assyrians were the first of all races to hold world power, then the Medes, and after them the Persians, and then the Macedonians. Then through the defeat of Kings Philip and Antiochus, of Macedonian origin, following closely upon the overthrow of Carthage, the world power passed to the Roman people. Between this time and the beginning of the reign of Ninus king of the Assyrians, who was the first to hold world power, lies an interval of nineteen hundred and ninety-five years.

== Bibliography ==
- Eigler, Ulrich. "Sura: [2] Aemilius S. Author of a work of history". In Brill's New Pauly, online edition. 2006.
- Mommsen, Theodor. "Litterarhistorisches". In Rheinisches Museum für Philologie vol. 16 (1861), pp. 282–287.
- Forcellini, Aegidius and Iosephus Perin. "Sura". In Lexicon totius latinitatis: Onomasticon. Padua: 1940.
- Velleius Paterculus. Compendium of Roman History. Res Gestae Divi Augusti. Translated by Frederick W. Shipley. Loeb Classical Library 152. Cambridge, MA: Harvard University Press, 1924.
