= As-Sirāt =

Bridge that all resurrected human beings must cross on the Day of Judgment in Islam

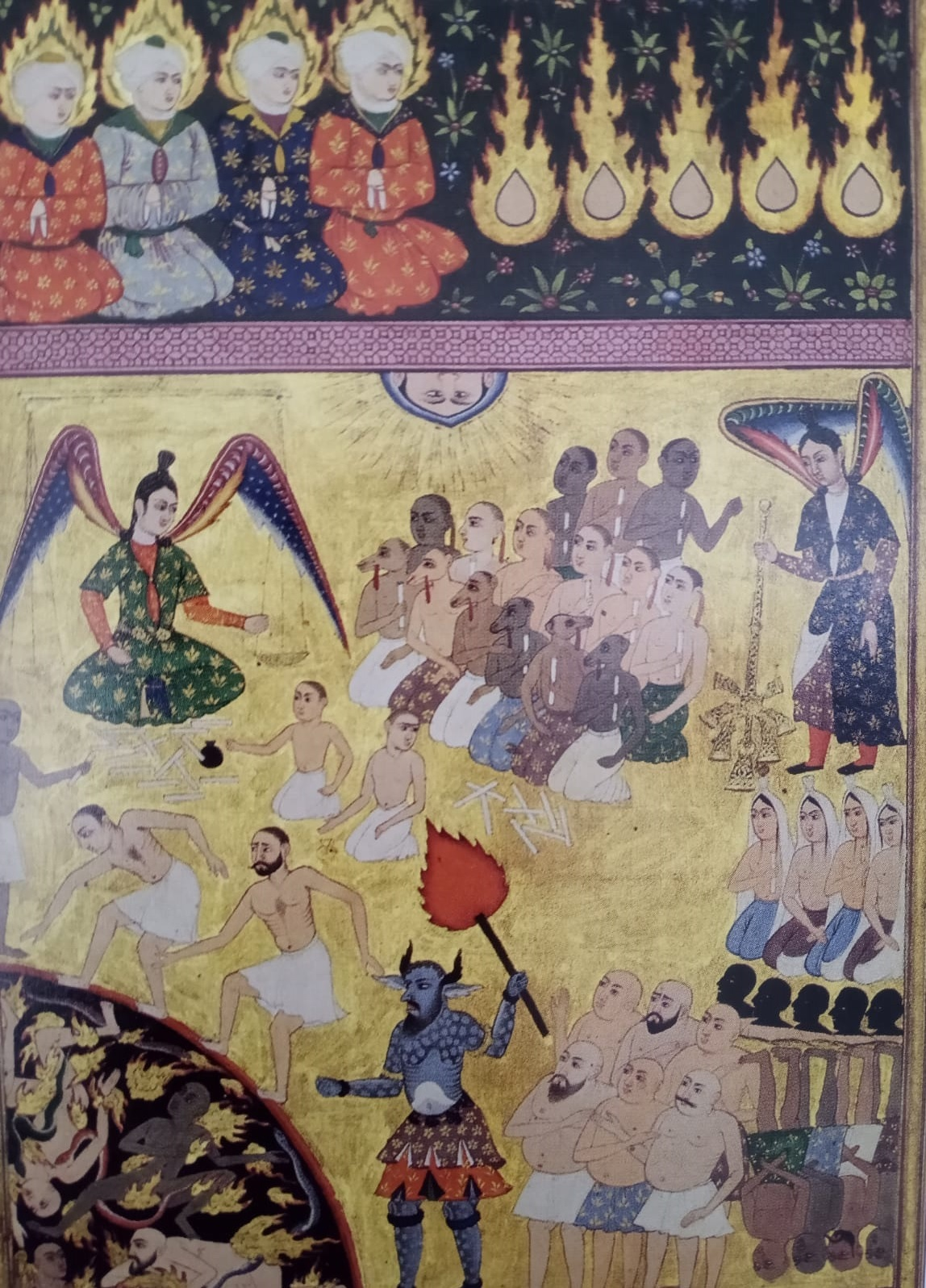
Image from a Falnama from India, created around 1610-1630, depicting the Last Judgement, Israfil on the top with a trumpet, a div below with a torch, the taqalan (ins and jinn) waiting to pass the Sirat Bridge to the afterlife with sinners falling off into hell filled with snakes, and the souls of the believers above in heaven.

Diagram of Ard al-Hashr (lit. 'Plain of Assembly') on the Day of Judgment. As-Sirāt (lit. 'the Bridge') is the line across of Jahannam (lit. 'Hell', the dark grey circle). Also shown are the Arsh (lit. 'Throne of God'), pulpits for the righteous (al-Aminun), seven rows of angels, Gabriel (al-Ruh), A'raf (the Barrier), the Pond of Abundance (Kawthar, a blue circle), al-Maqam al-Mahmud (lit. 'the Praiseworthy Station'; where the prophet Muhammad will stand to intercede for the faithful), Mizan (lit. 'the Scale'), and Marj al-Jannat (lit. 'Meadow of Paradise'). (From an autograph manuscript of Futuhat al-Makkiyya by Sufi mystic and Muslim philosopher Ibn Arabi, c. 1238.)

As-Sirāt (Arabic: الصراط) is, according to Islam, the bridge over which every person must pass on the Yawm al-Qiyamah (lit. 'Day of Resurrection') in order to enter Jannah (lit. 'Paradise').

It is not explicitly mentioned in the Quran, but described in the Hadith. As-Sirāt is said to be thinner than a strand of hair and as sharp as the sharpest knife or sword (because of its danger). Below this path are the fires of Hell, which burn the sinners to make them fall. Those who performed acts of goodness in their lives are transported across the path at speeds according to their deeds leading them to the Hawd al-Kawthar (lit. 'Pond of Abundance').

== Etymology ==
Early Muslim writers were uncertain on how to spell this word as it was rendered صراط, سراط and زراط. They were equally uncertain of its gender. It appears ultimately to be the Hellenised στράτα of Latin: strata (lit. 'street'), which entered Arabic via Classical Syriac: ܐܣܛܪܛܐ.

== Background ==
On Judgement Day, after the dead have been resurrected, assembled, and judged by God, the saved and the damned now being clearly distinguished, the souls will traverse over hellfire via the bridge of As-Sirāt. The faithful will "move easily and swiftly across a broad path", led first of all by Muhammad and other leading lights of the community on their way to Jannah; those judged guilty of sin but still considered to be mu'minun (lit. 'believers') will fall from the bridge into jahannam (lit. 'hellfire') but remain there only for a limited period of purgation; unbelievers, however, will find the bridge has become "sharper than a sword and thinner than a hair" and darkness blinds their way. Their inevitable fall from the bridge will be an "inescapable descent" into their fiery destination of everlasting punishment. (Note: One description from al-Suyūtī, al-Durar reads: "The Sirāt is finer than a hair and sharper than a sword; on its edges are metal hooks that grab onto one. If a person falls it involves a 3000 year journey-1000 climbing back up, another 1000 trying to travel along the bridge, and again another falling down.")

=== Quran ===
This specific event is reported to be alluded to in the Quran (19:68-71),

"By your Lord ˹O Prophet˺! We will surely gather them along with the devils, and then set them around Hell on their knees

Then We will certainly begin by dragging out of every group the ones most defiant to the Most Compassionate.

And We truly know best who is most deserving of burning in it.

There is none of you who will not pass over it. ˹This is˺ a decree your Lord must fulfill."

also worth noting are Q.36:66 and Q.37:23-24, although both sets "are rather indefinite". Only Q.37:23-24 mentions hell in the form of al-jahīm.

On this Day We will seal their mouths, their hands will speak to Us, and their feet will testify to what they used to commit.

Had We willed, We could have easily blinded their eyes, so they would struggle to find their way. How then could they see?^{[Quran 36:65–66]}

˹They will be told,˺ "This is the Day of ˹Final˺ Decision which you used to deny."

˹Allah will say to the angels,˺ "Gather ˹all˺ the wrongdoers along with their peers, and whatever they used to worship

instead of Allah, then lead them ˹all˺ to the path of Hell [ṣirāṭ al-jahīm].

And detain them, for they must be questioned."

˹Then they will be asked,˺ "What is the matter with you that you can no longer help each other?"

Q.37:21-25

Neither set of verses mentions a bridge nor falling into hell, but Ṣirāṭ al-jahīm "was adopted into Islamic tradition to signify the span over jahannam, the top layer of the Fire".^{[Quran 37:21–27]}

In the hadith about "the bridge" or a bridge to hell or a bridge between heaven and hell, or over hell. According to one Sahih al-Bukhari hadith:

"... We, the companions of the Prophet said, "O Allah's Apostle! What is the bridge?' He said, "It is a slippery (bridge) on which there are clamps and (Looks like) a thorny seed that is wide at one side and narrow at the other and has thorns with bent ends. Such a thorny seed is found in Najd and is called As-Sa'dan. Some of the believers will cross the bridge as quickly as the wink of an eye, some others as quick as lightning, a strong wind, fast horses or she-camels. So some will be safe without any harm; some will be safe after receiving some scratches, and some will fall down going into Hell. The last person will cross by being dragged over the bridge."

== In other religions ==
"The idea of a bridge crossing to the underworld has found expression in a number of different religious traditions" In Judaism, a version of this doctrine is espoused by Philo of Alexandria in De Somniis, where he interprets "Jacob's ladder" as symbolic of the aerial realm, the air between heaven and earth, through which departed spirits ascend before either united to God or falling back to earth to be reincarnated. The Zohar also seems to have a similar view. (Zohar 1, 99a & b) Zoroastrianism also has this idea. The Chinvat bridge, which occurs in the Gathas of Zarathushtra, has many similarities and is a close concept to As-Sirat. S.G.F. Brandon quotes the Dāstan-i Mēnōk-i Krat

" ... pursued by the malevolence of the evildoer Wrath who bears a bloody spear, (the soul) will come to the Bridge of the Requiter, lofty and dreadful, for thither must saved and damned alike proceed." The Chinvat Bridge is also referred to many times in both Avestan and Pahlavi literature.

Certain forms of Christianity also feature a similar bridge or passage, such as the Brig of Dread in folk Western Christianity, or the passage through the aerial toll houses in Eastern Orthodoxy.

Manichaeism calls this path to heaven or paradise the "Pillar of Glory" and identifies it with the Milky Way. Like the versions of this doctrine in Philo and the Kabbalah, the Manichaean account entails reincarnation as a possibility resulting from falling off the path or turning back.

== Cultural references ==
American science fiction author Frank Herbert adopted the idea for his novel Dune. In the Orange Catholic Bible, life is described as a journey across the Sirat, with "Paradise on my Right, Hell on my Left, and the Angel of Death Behind".

The bridge is the namesake of Sirāt, which opens with an explanation of it in Spanish. (Note: "EXISTE UN PUENTE LLAMADO SIRĀT QUE UNE INFIERNO Y PARAÍSO. SE ADVIERTE AL QUE LO CRUZA QUE SU PASO ES MÁS ESTRECHO QUE UNA HEBRA DE CABELLO, MÁS AFILADO QUE UNA ESPADA.")

There is a Persian curse "meet you [at] Sirat".

== See also ==
- Silat Bridge - a Yazidi sacred bridge in Lalish, Kurdistan, Iraq
- Vaitarani (mythology) - a mythological river
- Styx - a similar concept in Greek mythology
