= Sura (Lycia) =

Ancient Lycian town

Coordinates: 36°14′42″N 29°56′38″E

Sura or Soura (Ancient Greek: Σούρα) was a town of ancient Lycia, noted for its oracle of Apollo.

Its site is located near Yuva Koyu in modern Asiatic Turkey.
