= Duzakh =

Hell in Persian mythology

Duzakh (Persian: دوزخ, romanized: Dòzâx) is Hell in the Iranian mythology. The word was dao‘aηúha in the Avestan and dušokh in Middle Persian. In Zoroastrianism, Duzakh is described as a deep well that is dark, stinky, and extremely narrow. The smallest of the xrafstars (harmful creatures in Zoroastrian mythology) are "as big as mountains" and "all devour and destroy the souls of the damned".

There happens the most horrible punishments and tortures adapted to the sins committed by the damned. There is much emphasis on sexual crimes, but also on other actions disapproved of by Mazdean ethics. Duzakh is firstly the residence of Ahriman, the demons, and the drujes ("deceit, falsehood"). All atmospheric calamities are associated with it: snow, cold, hail, rain, burning heat.

Duzakh is used as a word for Hell in many modern languages including Persian, Pashto, Kurdish, Balochi, Turkmen, Uzbek, Bengali, Punjabi, and Hindi-Urdu. The word for Hell in Georgian, Dzjodzjokheti (ჯოჯოხეთი), is of Persian origin.

== Sources ==
- Encyclopædia Iranica: Iranian Religions: Zoroastrianism: Hell & its Concept in the Iranian Culture, By: Philippe Gignoux.
- Zâdspram, Wizîdagîhâ, ed. and tr. with comm. Philippe Gignoux and Ahmad Tafazzoli as Anthologie de Zâdspram, Paris, 1994.
