= Seyreh =

Seyreh صيره
- Village
- Location within Iran
- Coordinates: 31°04′04″N 48°22′22″E
- Country: Iran
- Province: Khuzestan
- County: Ahvaz
- Bakhsh: Central
- Rural District: Esmailiyeh

Population (2006)
  - Total: 214
- Time zone: UTC+3:30 (IRST)
  - Summer (DST): UTC+4:30 (IRDT)

Seyreh (Persian: صيره, also Romanized as Şeyreh; also known as Sereh, Seyareh, and Sirah) is a village in Esmailiyeh Rural District, in the Central District of Ahvaz County, Khuzestan Province, Iran. At the 2006 census, its population was 214, in 42 families.
