= Abu Bakr ibn Ayyash =

Primary transmitter of Qira'at (713-809 AD)

Abu Bakr ibn ‘Ayyash al-Asadi al-Kufi
- شعبة بن عياش

Personal life
- Born: 713 AD / 95 AH
- Died: 809 AD / 193 AH (aged 95-96)
- Home town: Kufa
- Parent: 'Ayyash ibn Salim al-Asadi (father)

Religious life
- Religion: Islam

Muslim leader
- Teacher: Aasim ibn Abi al-Najud

Abu Bakr Shu‘bah ibn ‘Ayyash ibn Salim al-Asadi al-Kufi al-Nahshali (Arabic: أبو بكر شعبة بن عياش بن سالم الأسدي الكوفي النهشلي, 95-193 AH/713-808 CE), more commonly known as Shu'bah, is a significant figure in the history of Qur'an readings as well as a hadith narrator. Like Hafs, Shu'bah narrated one of seven conical readings of the Quran from Aasim ibn Abi al-Najud, though the reading of Hafs is more well known in the Muslim world today.

== Biography ==
He was a Mawla (freedman) of Wasl ibn Hayyan al-Ahdab al-Asadi, and used to reside in Kufa. His Kunya and name are the same (Abu Bakr). He was a Quran reciter, jurist, and hadith scholar known for his piety. He learned the Quran from Asim and jurisprudence from Al-Mughira.

He perfected his recitation three times under the guidance of Asim. Shu'bah is reported to have said:

I learned the Quran from Asim just as a child learns from his teacher. He was very strict with me, and I only excelled in his recitation. Everything I narrate to you regarding Quran recitations, I learned directly from Asim.

In another narration he says:

I studied with Asim for about three years in the heat, cold, and rain until I was ashamed of the people at the mosque of Banu Kahl. Asim said to me: Praise Allah, for you came to me not knowing anything. I replied: I left the school and came to you. He then said: I departed from Asim without missing a single letter of the Quran.

A group of people studied Qur'an recitation under him, including Abu al-Hasan al-Kisa'i (who died before him), Yahya al-'Ilmi, Abu Yusuf al-A'sha, 'Abdul-Hamid ibn Salih al-Burjami, 'Urwa ibn Muhammad al-Asadi, 'Abdur-Rahman ibn Abi Hammad, and Yahya ibn Adam, who learned and mastered the pronunciation of the letters from him. Abu Bakr spend forty years completing the Quran every day and night. He stopped teaching the Quran twenty years before his death, but continued narrating hadith.

He is generally considered Thiqa (Trustworthy) in narrating hadith. Hadith are narrated from him in all books of Kutub al-Sittah. Shady Nasser quotes ad-Dhahabi as bringing a report that Shu'bah rejected the reading of his contemporary Hamzah az-Zaiyyat as bid'ah.

== Dialogue between Harun al-Rashid and Shu'bah ==
Harun al-Rashid summoned Abu Bakr ibn Ayyash from Kufa. He came accompanied by Waki'. When they entered, Waki' was guiding him. Al-Rashid brought him close and said to him, You have witnessed the days of the Umayyads and our days—who is better? Abu Bakr replied, You are better at performing the prayers, but they were more beneficial to the people. Al-Rashid rewarded him with 6,000 dinars and dismissed him. He also rewarded Waki' with 3,000 dinars.

== Beliefs ('Aqeedah) ==
Hamza ibn Sa'id al-Marwazi said: I asked Abu Bakr ibn Ayyash: Have you heard what happened with Ibn 'Ulayya regarding the Quran? He replied: Woe to you! Whoever claims that the Qur'an is created is a disbeliever, a heretic, and an enemy of Allah in our view. We do not sit with him or speak to him.

Ahmad ibn Yunus said to Shu'bah: I have a neighbor who is a Rafidi, and he is sick. He said: Visit him as you would visit a Jew or a Christian, but do not intend to seek reward for it.

== Reception ==
- Ahmed bin Hanbal said about him: "He is truthful and trustworthy, a reciter of the Qur’an and a good person".
- Ibn Al-Mubarak said: "I have not seen anyone who adheres to the Sunnah more quickly than Abu Bakr ibn Ayyash"
- Sulayman al-Aʽmash said: "I have not seen anyone who prayed better than Abu Bakr ibn Ayyash".

== Death ==
When death approached him, his sister cried, so he said to her: "What makes you cry? Look at that corner, for I have completed eighteen thousand recitations (of the Quran) there". He died in Jumada Al-Ula, 193AH (February/March 809 CE).

== See also ==
=== Ten readers and their transmitters ===
- Nafi‘ al-Madani
  - Qalun
  - Warsh
- Ibn Kathir al-Makki
  - Al-Bazzi
  - Qunbul
- Abu 'Amr ibn al-'Ala'
  - Ad-Duri
  - Al-Susi
- Ibn Amir ad-Dimashqi
  - Hisham ibn Ammar
  - Ibn Dhakwan
- Aasim ibn Abi al-Najud
  - Shu'bah
  - Hafs
- Hamzah az-Zaiyyat
  - Khalaf
  - Khallad
- Al-Kisa'i
  - Al-Layth
  - Ad-Duri
- Abu Ja'far
  - 'Isa ibn Waddan
  - Ibn Jummaz
- Ya'qub al-Yamani
  - Ruways
  - Rawh
- Khalaf
  - Ishaq
  - Idris
