= Hafs =

Early Islamic figure (706–796 AD)

Abu ‘Amr Ḥafṣ ibn Sulayman al-Asadi al-Kufi
- حفص بن سليمان

Personal life
- Born: AD 706 Baghdad, Umayyad Caliphate
- Died: AD 796 (aged 89–90) Kufa, Abbasid Caliphate
- Home town: Makkah
- Parent: Sulayman ibn al-Mughirah ibn Abi Dawud (father)
- Known for: Transmitting a Qira'at which became the famous riwayah in the Muslim world

Religious life
- Religion: Islam

Muslim leader
- Teacher: Aasim ibn Abi al-Najud
- Students: Obaid bin Al-Saba

Hafs (Abū ʽAmr Ḥafṣ ibn Sulaymān ibn al-Mughīrah ibn Abi Dawud al-Asadī al-Kūfī, Arabic: أبو عمرو حفص بن سليمان بن المغيرة الأسدي الكوفي, 706–796 AD; 90–180 AH), according to Islamic tradition, was one of the primary transmitters of one of the seven canonical methods of Qur'an recitation (qira'at). His method via his teacher Aasim ibn Abi al-Najud has become the most popular method across the majority of the Muslim world.

In addition to being the student of Aasim, Hafs was also his stepson. Having been born in Baghdad, Hafs eventually moved to Mecca where he popularized his father-in-law's recitation method.

Eventually, Hafs' recitation of Aasim's method was made the official method of Egypt, having been formally adopted as the standard Egyptian printing of the Qur'an under the auspices of Fuad I of Egypt in 1923. The majority of copies of the Quran today follow the reading of Hafs. In North and West Africa there is a bigger tendency to follow the reading of Warsh.

== Hafs recitation ==
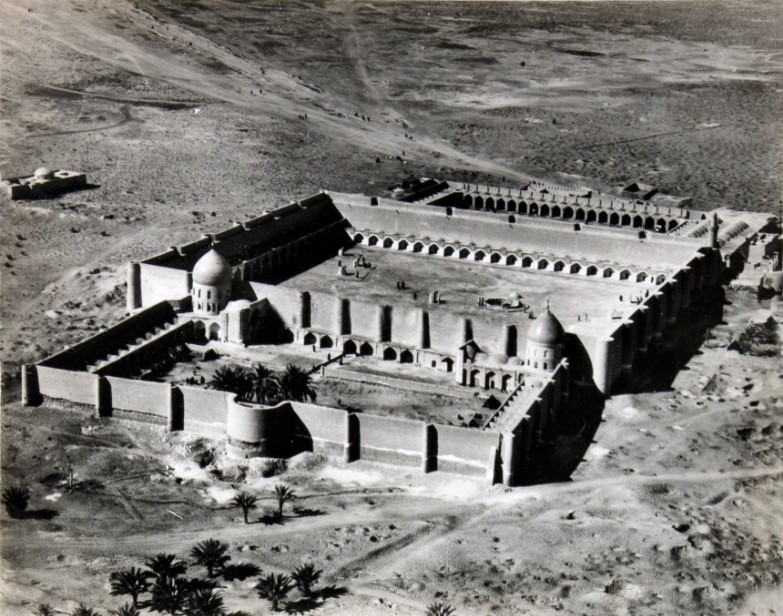
The Great Mosque of Kufa, 1915 CE

Of all the canonical recitation traditions, only the Kufan tradition of Hafs included the bismillah as a separate verse in Chapter (surah) 1.

In the 10thC, in his Kitāb al-sabʿa fī l-qirāʾāt, Ibn Mujahid mentioned the seven readings of the Quran which originally were all recited by the Prophet of Islam to his followers. Three of their readers hailed from Kufa, a centre of early Islamic learning. The three Kufan readers were Al-Kisa'i, the Kufan; Hamzah az-Zaiyyat; and Aasim ibn Abi al-Najud.

It is, alongside the Hafs 'an 'Asim tradition which represents the recitational tradition of Kufa, one of the two major oral transmission of the Quran in the Muslim World. The influential standard Quran of Cairo that was published in 1924 is based on Hafs 'an ʻAsim's recitation.

== Chain of Transmission ==
Imam Hafs ibn Suleiman ibn al-Mughirah al-Asadi al-Kufi learned from Aasim ibn Abi al-Najud al-Kufi al-Tabi'i from Abu 'Abd al-Rahman al-Sulami from Uthman ibn Affan, Ali ibn Abu Talib, Ubayy ibn Ka'b, and Zaid ibn Thabit from Muhammad.

Hafs' Recitation Chain of Transmission
Level	Reciter
1	Muhammad
2	Uthman ibn Affan, Ali ibn Abu Talib, Ubayy ibn Ka'b, Abdullah ibn Masud, and Zaid ibn Thabit
3	Abu 'Abd al-Rahman al-Sulami
4	Aasim ibn Abi al-Najud
5	Imam Hafs

== Ten readers and transmitters ==
- Nafi' al-Madani
  - Qalun
  - Warsh
- Ibn Kathir al-Makki
  - Al-Bazzi
  - Qunbul
- Abu 'Amr ibn al-'Ala'
  - Ad-Duri
  - Al-Susi
- Ibn Amir ad-Dimashqi
  - Hisham ibn Ammar
  - Ibn Dhakwan
- Aasim ibn Abi al-Najud
  - Shu'bah
  - Hafs
- Hamzah az-Zaiyyat
  - Khalaf
  - Khallad
- Al-Kisa'i
  - Al-Layth
  - Ad-Duri
- Abu Ja'far
  - 'Isa ibn Waddan
  - Ibn Jummaz
- Ya'qub al-Yamani
  - Ruways
  - Rawh
- Khalaf al-Bazzar
  - Ishaq
  - Idris
