= Ten recitations =

Qira'ats and recitations of the Quran

The ten recitations or ten readings are ten Qira'ats and recitations of the Quran approved by scholars in their research to determine the frequent recitations.

== History ==
The Quran was revealed in seven ahruf or letters, and the letters are not only in writing but also in pronunciation, meaning, vowel, endowment signs, and brevity due to the different accents and dialects of the Arabs who recited the Qu'ran. The Qu'ran was only revealed to the Prophet Muhammad, but his companions included a diverse population of Arabic speakers, and thus, differences in recitations arose.

Uthman ibn Affan compiled the Quran in one formation, and there are seven fixed recitations and three complementary readings of the seven, so the ten readings are completed, and all these readings and their pronouncements were reported by Muhammad and were transmitted by the Sahaba, the Tabi'un, and so on.

== Spread ==
Most of these ten recitations are known by the scholars and people who have received them, and their number is due to their spreading in the Islamic world.

However, the general population of Muslims dispersed in most countries of the Islamic world, their number estimated in the millions, read Hafs's narration on the authority of Aasim, which is more simply known as the Hafs' an Aasim style of recitation.

In the countries of the Maghreb, they read by reciting Imam Nafi, who is the imam of the people of Medina, whether it is the narration of Warsh or the narration of Qalun. However, Warsh' an Nafi tends to be more prevalent than Qalun an' Nafi.

In Somalia, Sudan and Hadhramaut, they read the narration that Al-Duri narrated on the authority of Abu Amr.

== Presentation ==
When the ten recitations were scientifically stabilized, after an increase of three other readings added to the Ahruf and the recitations of the Seven readers by Imam Ibn al-Jazari, the total became ten readings, and these three added readings are the readings of these Imams:

- Abu Jaafar al-Madani.
- Yaqoub al-Hadrami.
- Khalaf ibn Hisham.

== Recitations ==
The ten proven and verified recitations of the Imams Qāriʾs of the Quran are in order:

1. Nafiʽ al-Madani recitation.
2. Ibn Kathir al-Makki recitation.
3. Abu Amr of Basra recitation.
4. Ibn Amir ad-Dimashqi recitation.
5. Aasim ibn Abi al-Najud recitation.
6. Hamzah az-Zaiyyat recitation.
7. Al-Kisa'i recitation.
8. Abu Jaafar al-Madani recitation.
9. Yaqoub al-Hadrami recitation.
10. Khalaf ibn Hisham recitation.

== Riwayaat ==
For each of the ten recitations, there are two reading versions or riwaya, which counts twenty confirmed riwayaat:

Twenty Quran confirmed Riwayaat
| N° | Qāriʾ | Riwayaat |
|---|---|---|
| 01 | Nafiʽ al-Madani | Warsh recitation; Qalun recitation |
| 02 | Ibn Kathir al-Makki | Al-Bazzi recitation; Qunbul recitation |
| 03 | Abu Amr of Basra | Al-Douri 'an Abi 'Amr recitation; Al-Soussi recitation |
| 04 | Ibn Amir ad-Dimashqi | Hisham recitation; Ibn Thaqouan recitation |
| 05 | Aasim ibn Abi al-Najud | Shu'bah recitation; Hafs recitation |
| 06 | Hamzah az-Zaiyyat | Khalaf recitation; Khallad recitation |
| 07 | Al-Kisa'i | Al-Layth recitation; Al-Duri 'an Al-Kissa'i recitation |
| 08 | Abu Ja'far al-Madani | Isa ibn Wirdan alhidha' Al-Madani recitation; Sulaiman ibn Jummaz recitation |
| 09 | Yaqoub al-Hadrami | Ruwais recitation; Ruwh ibn abd Al-Momen recitation |
| 10 | Khalaf ibn Hisham | Ishaq ibn Ibrahim Al-Warraq recitation; Idris ibn Abd Al-Karim Al-Haddad recitation |

== See also ==
- Qira'at
- Ahruf
- Seven readers
- Ijazah
- Special recitations
