= Qalun =

Qalun (قالون)
- Born: 738CE; 120AH; Madina
- Died: 835CE; 220AH; Madina
- Other name: Abu Musa ‘Isa Ibn Mina al-Zarqi

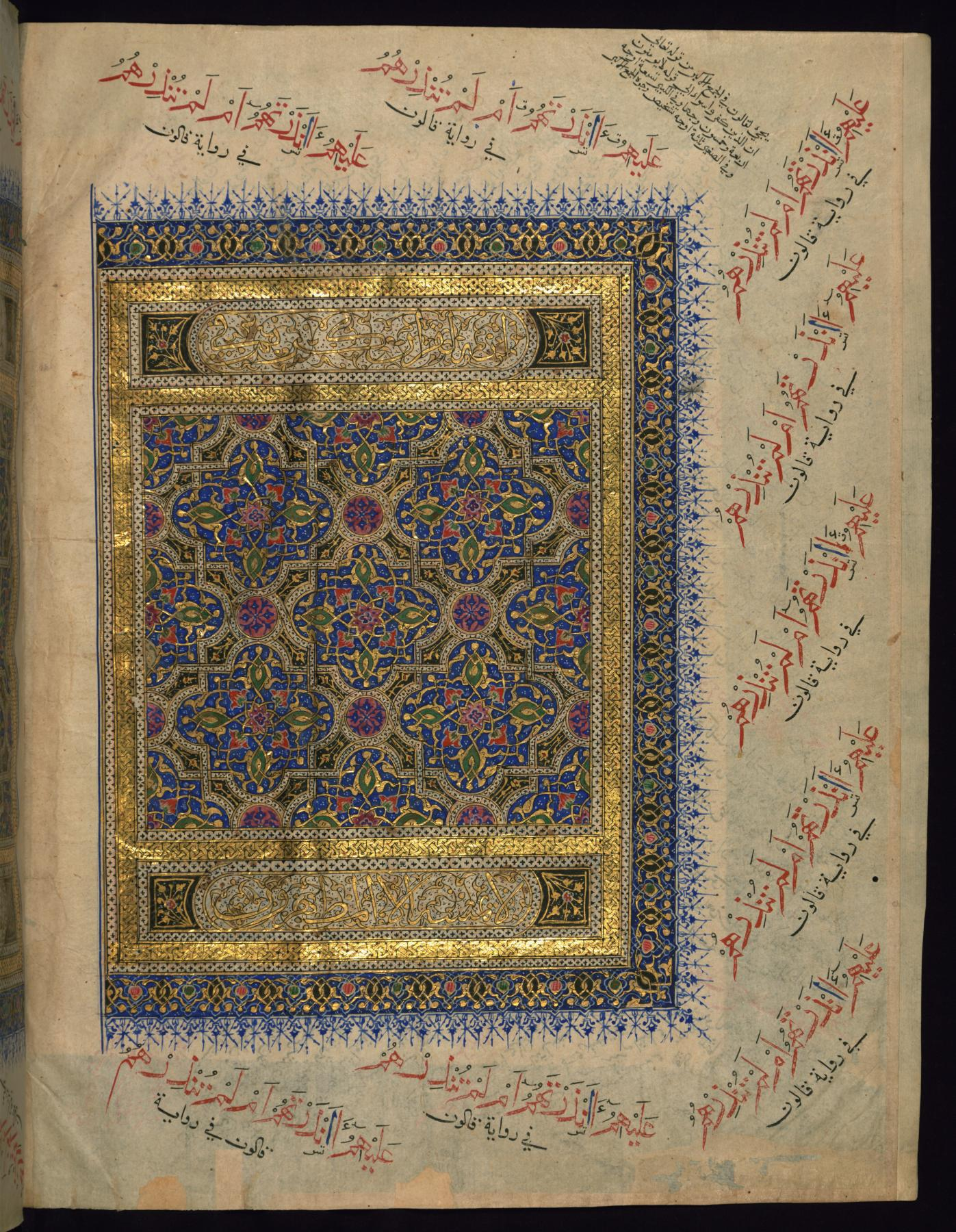

Abu Musa ‘Isa Ibn Mina al-Zarqi, better known as Qalun (120-220AH), was a significant figure in the spread of the Qira'at, or variant methods for recitation of the Qur'an. Being one of the two primary transmitters of the canonical method of Nafi‘ al-Madani, Qalun's recitation is currently the norm for Qur'an reading in mosques in Qatar as well as parts of Libya and Tunisia, and is quite popular among West Africans. The method of Qalun and his counterpart Warsh was also the most popular method of recitation in Islamic Spain.

Because he was deaf, he would detect and correct his students' mistakes, according to ibn Abu Khatim, by reading their lips; according to Yaqut, by getting so close to the student's mouth with his ear. He was born in Medina in the year 738, and he died there in 835.

== See also ==
=== Ten readers and transmitters ===
- Nafi‘ al-Madani
  - Qalun
  - Warsh
- Ibn Kathir al-Makki
  - Al-Bazzi
  - Qunbul
- Abu 'Amr ibn al-'Ala'
  - Ad-Duri
  - Al-Susi
- Ibn Amir ad-Dimashqi
  - Hisham ibn Ammar
  - Ibn Dhakwan
- Aasim ibn Abi al-Najud
  - Shu'bah
  - Hafs
- Hamzah az-Zaiyyat
  - Khalaf
  - Khallad
- Al-Kisa'i
  - Abū al-Ḥārith ibn Khālid al-Layth
  - Ad-Duri
- Abu Ja'far
  - 'Isa ibn Waddan
  - Ibn Jummaz
- Ya'qub al-Yamani
  - Ruways
  - Rawh
- Khalaf]]
  - Ishaq
  - Idris
