= Abu Bakr Ibn Mujāhid =

Islamic studies scholar (859/860–936)

Ibn Mujahid
- ابن مجاهد

Personal life
- Born: 859-860 CE/245 AH Baghdad
- Died: 936 CE/324 AH Baghdad
- Main interest(s): Qira'at
- Notable work(s): Kitāb al-sabʿa fī l-qirāʾāt
- Known for: Canonising the different readings of the Quran (qiraat)

Religious life
- Religion: Islam

Muslim leader
- Influenced by: Qunbul, Muhammad ibn Ahmad al-Dajuni

Abu Bakr Ahmad ibn Musa ibn al-Abbas ibn Mujahid al-Atashi (Arabic: أبو بكر أحمد بن موسى بن العباس بن مجاهد التميمي, romanized: Abū Bakr Aḥmad ibn Mūsā ibn al-ʿAbbās Ibn Mujāhid al-ʿAṭashī, 859/860 – 936) was an Islamic scholar most notable for establishing and delineating the seven canonical Quranic readings (qira'at) in his work Kitāb al-sabʿa fī l-qirāʾāt. He was also notable for delivering the charge of heretical Quranic exegesis that reopened the trial of Mansur al-Hallaj, which ultimately led to his execution on the orders of the Abbasid caliph al-Muqtadir.

== Biography ==
Ibn Mujahid was born in Baghdad in 859-860 CE/245 AH, where he studied hadith and Quran. He learned the latter from Muhammad ibn Ahmad al-Dajuni and Qunbul, both transmitters of his later canonical readings. It is unknown which school of Islamic jurisprudence Ibn Mujahid ascribed to, although he expressed admiration for the Shafi'i school. He became a renowned specialist in the Quranic readings – the size of his study circle is given variously as 84 and 300 students – and assisted the Abbasid vizier Ali ibn Isa ibn al-Jarrah with writing a commentary on the text. He died on 13 July 936 CE/20 Shaban 324 AH.

== Canonisation of the Quranic Readings ==
In his Kitāb al-sabʿa fī l-qirāʾāt, Ibn Mujahid establishes seven readings of the Quran which would later be known as the canonical 'Seven'. Three of their readers hailed from Kufa, while the others were from Mecca, Medina, Damascus, and Basra – all centres of early Islamic learning. They were:

- The Medinese reader Nafiʽ
- The Meccan reader Ibn Kathir.
- The Damascene reader Ibn Amir.
- The Basran reader Abu Amr.
- The Kufan reader Al-Kisa'i.
- The Kufan reader Hamzah az-Zaiyyat.
- The Kufan reader Aasim ibn Abi al-Najud.

It is not known why three readers from Kufa were chosen. According to Al-Suyuti, a certain Ibn Jubayr al-Makki had compiled a list on five readings, each from a city where the caliph Uthman had sent an Uthmanic codex. Ibn Mujahid emulated Ibn Jubayr in including five readings, and added two from Kufa to substitute for the codices sent to Yemen and Bahrain, which had not been heard about since they were sent. Yasin Dutton suggests Ibn Mujahid found it difficult to only select one due to his familiarity with the city, hence the inclusion of three readers from three different generations.

It is also unknown why Ibn Mujahid excluded other available readings; later scholars included ten and fourteen readings in their lists. It has been suggested by Western scholars that seven was chosen based on hadiths which state the Quran was revealed in seven ahruf. The choice attracted criticism from later Muslim scholars, who commented that it caused confusion between the ahruf and canonical readings.

== Personal views ==
Siding with the traditionists over the grammarians, Ibn Mujahid was concerned by Quranic readers who would recite grammatically sound variants of the text that had no precedent in previously transmitted readings. He was involved with the prosecution of grammarian-readers who insisted on doing so, notably Ibn Miqsam and Ibn Shanabudh.

He also cautioned against memorising the Quran without knowledge of Arabic grammar, warning that it could damage the reader's ability to remember verses. The reader would then be prone to recite grammatically incorrect constructions that would be falsely attributed to their teachers.

== See also ==
- Qira'at
- Ahruf
- Ten recitations
- Seven readers
