= Al-Humazah =

104th chapter of the Qur'an

Surah 104 of the Quran
ٱلهُمَزَة Al-Humaza The Slanderer
- Qira'ah; English text
- Classification: Meccan
- Other names: The Traducer, The Gossipmonger, The Backbiter
- Position: Juzʼ 30
- No. of verses: 9
- No. of words: 33
- No. of letters: 133

Al-Humazah
Recitation of Al-Humazah in mujawwad

Al-Humazah (Arabic: الهمزة: "The Backbiter", "The Slanderer", or "The Scorner") is the 104th chapter (sūrah) of the Qur'an, with 9 āyāt or verses.

۝ Woe to every backbiter, slanderer,
۝ who amasses (Note: Ibn Amir, Hamza, Abu Ja'far, Khalaf and Rawh Qira'at read it as "Kept amassing") wealth ˹greedily˺ and counts it ˹repeatedly˺,
۝ thinking that their wealth will make them immortal!
۝ Not at all! Such a person will certainly be tossed into the Crusher.
۝ And what will make you realize what the Crusher is?
۝ ˹It is˺ Allah's kindled Fire,
۝ which rages over the hearts.
۝ It will be sealed over them,
۝ ˹tightly secured˺ with long braces.

The Surah takes its name from the word humazah occurring in the first verse. The main statement in this surah is the Consequences of man in loss. It condemns those who slander others, whether by speech or action, and imagine that their own wealth will keep them immune from death, and describes the doom of Hell which awaits them.

Regarding the timing and contextual background of the revelation (asbāb al-nuzūl), it is an earlier "Meccan surah", which means it is believed to have been revealed in Mecca, rather than later in Medina.

== Summary ==
- 1-3Woes pronounced on slanderers and backbiters
- 4-9 Al Hutama described

== Text and meaning ==
=== Text and transliteration ===
- Warsh from Nafiʽ al-Madani

بِسۡمِ اِ۬للَّهِ اِ۬لرَّحۡمَٰنِ اِ۬لرَّحِيمِ ۝
Bismi l-lāhi r-raḥmāni r-raḥīm(i)
وَيۡلٌ لِّكُلِّ هُمَزَةٍ لُّمَزَةٍ ۝١
^{1} Waylu l-likul-li humazati l-lumazah(tin)
اِ۬لَّذِے جَمَعَ مَالًا وَعَدَّدَهُۥ ۝٢
^{2} ’al-ladhī jama‘a māla w-wa‘ad-dadah(ū)
يَحۡسِبُ أَنَّ مَالَهُۥٓ أَخۡلَدَهُۥ ۝٣
^{3} Yaḥsabu ’an-na mālahū ’akhladah(ū)
كَلَّا لَيُنۢبَذَنَّ فِے اِ۬لۡحُطَمَةِ ۝٤
^{4} Kal-lā, layunbadhan-na fi l-ḥuṭamah(ti)
وَمَآ أَدۡرٜيٰكَ مَا اَ۬لۡحُطَمَةُ ۝٥
^{5} Wamā ’adrāka ma l-ḥuṭamah(tu)
نَارُ اَ۬للَّهِ اِ۬لۡمُوقَدَةُ ۝٦
^{6} Nāru l-lāhi l-mūqadah(tu)
اَ۬لَّتِى تَطَّلِعُ عَلَے اَ۬لَافۡـِٔدَةِ ۝٧
^{7} ’al latī taṭ-ṭali‘u ‘ala laf’idah(ti)
إِنَّهَا عَلَيۡهِم مُّوصَدَةٌ ۝٨
^{8} ’in-nahā ‘alayhi m-mūṣadah(tun)
فِے عَمَدٍ مُّمَدَّدَةٍۭ ۝٩
^{9} Fī ‘amadi m-mumad-dadah(tin)

=== Translation ===
^{1} Woe to every scorner and mocker
^{2} Who collects wealth and [continuously] counts it.
^{3} He thinks that his wealth will make him immortal.
^{4} No! He will surely be thrown into the Crusher.
^{5} And what can make you know what is the Crusher?
^{6} It is the fire of Allāh, [eternally] fueled,
^{7} Which mounts directed at the hearts.
^{8} Indeed, Hellfire will be closed down upon them
^{9} In extended columns.

Translation: Saheeh International, 1997

== Overview ==
In the phrase "slandering traducer" (Arabic: humaza lumaza), according to Ibn Kathir, the first word refers to slandering by speech, and the second to slander by action (though he also quotes Mujahid as saying the opposite: "Al-Humazah is with the hand and the eye, and Al-Lumazah is with the tongue.") The "fire ... which leapeth over the hearts" is sometimes interpreted as starting below and rising: according to Ibn Kathir, Muhammad bin Ka`b said that "it (the Fire) will devour every part of his body until it reaches his heart and comes to the level of his throat, then it will return to his body." The "columns" described in the final verse are interpreted as columns of fire by some authorities (e.g. As-Sudd), as in the translation above, but as literal pillars of iron by some others (e.g. Al-Awfi).

Surah Humazah tells how bad mankind can get into loss, and this is why some scholars state that there is no severer description given of hell in the Quran than the description given in this surah. Many severe and harsh descriptions of hell are mentioned throughout the Quran, however this Surah is especially unique, as Allah says about hell what He has not said in other Surahs: “Naarullah” ((the) Fire (of) Allah!).

In other surahs, Allah says “Naaru Jahannam” (Fire of Hell) etc. But when the fire is attributed to God, it's more than that, it's a fire lit by Allah Himself for those who opposed Him.

This is the last surah in the Quran which discusses the Akhirah (after life), and the surahs after this do not discuss the Akhirah afterlife again.
