= Warsh =

Muslim theologian of Quran (728–812)

Imam Warsh
- ورش
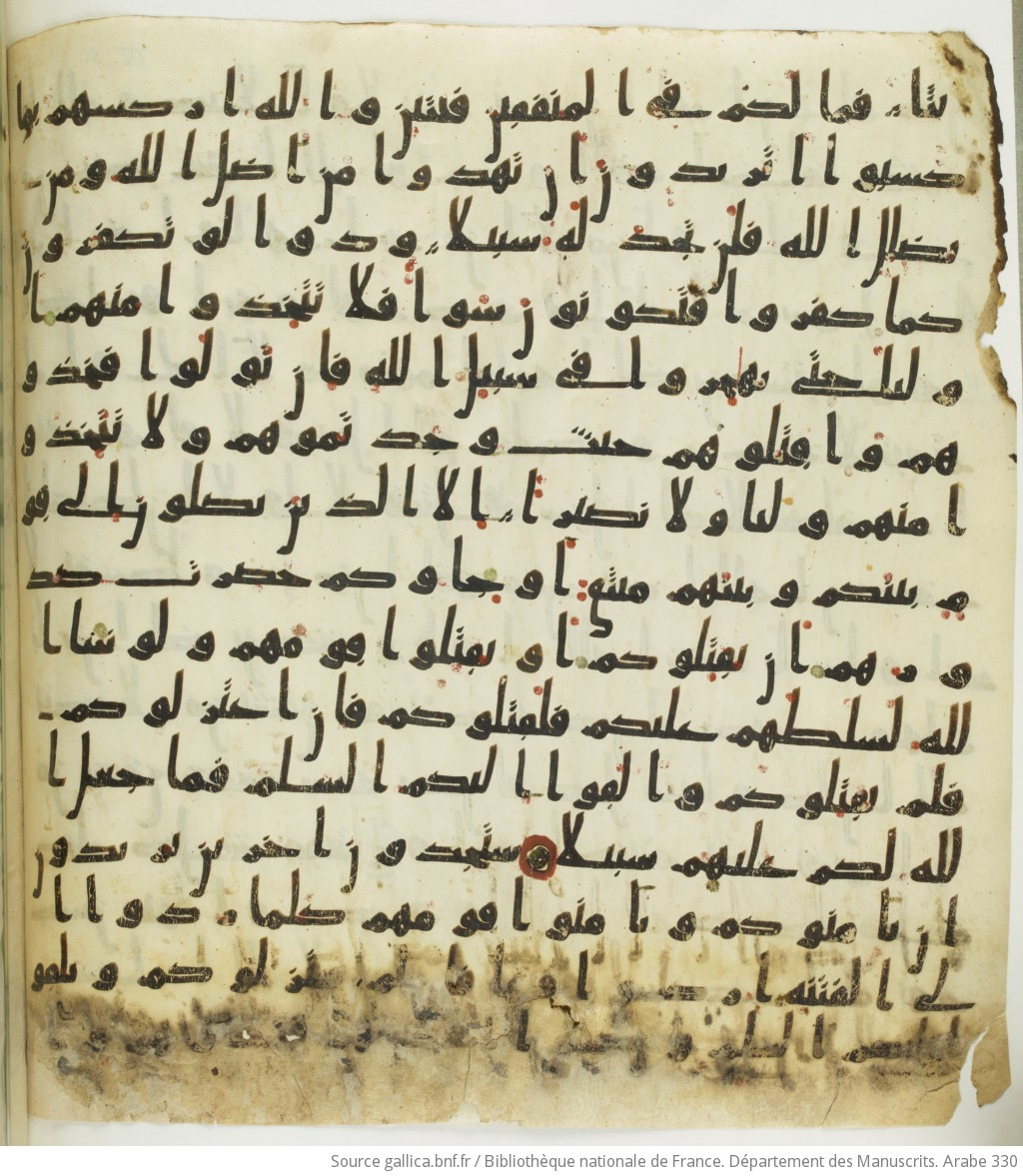
- An early Kufic Quranic folio from the 8th century. Distinct colored dots serve as vocalization guides to distinguish between the Qira'at of Warsh (green) and Hamza (red).
- Title: See list of titles: Imām ahl al-adāʾ (lit. 'Imam of the People of Recitation'); Shaykh al-Iqrāʾ biʾl-diyār al-Miṣriyya (lit. 'The Sheikh of Recitation in the Lands of Egypt'); Raʾīs ahl Miṣr (lit. 'Chief of the People of Egypt'); Raʾīs fī al-dirāya (lit. 'Master of Knowledge'); Raʾīs al-ḍabṭ waʾl-itqān (lit. 'Master of Precision and Perfection'); Shaykh al-Qurrāʾ (lit. 'The Shaykh of the Reciters')

Personal life
- Born: Uthman ibn Sa‘id al-Qutbi; 110 AH (728 CE) Qift, Egypt, Umayyad Caliphate
- Died: 197 AH (812 CE) (aged 87) Cairo, Egypt, Abbasid Caliphate
- Resting place: City of the Dead (Al-Qarafa cemetery); 30°0′55″N 31°15′33″E (Before Reburial)
- Era: Islamic Golden Age
- Region: Egypt, Hejaz
- Main interest(s): Qira'at (Quranic Recitation), Tajwid
- Known for: Warsh recitation (Riwayah Warsh 'an Nafi')

Religious life
- Religion: Islam

Muslim leader
- Teacher: Nafi‘ al-Madani
- Students: Ahmed al-Masri, Dawood bin Abi Tayyiba, Abu Ya'qub al-Azraq, Al-Asbahani
- Influenced by: Nafi‘ al-Madani; Isma'il bin Ja'far; Abd al-Rahman bin al-Qasim
- Influenced: Abu Ya'qub al-Azraq; Al-Asbahani

Military service
- Nickname(s): Al-Rawwās; Al-Warshān
- Arabic name
- Personal (Ism): ʿUthmān عثمان
- Patronymic (Nasab): ibn Saʿīd ibn ʿAbd Allāh ibn ʿAmr ibn Sulaymān ibn Ibrāhīm بن سعيد بن عبد الله بن عمرو بن سليمان بن إبراهيم
- Teknonymic (Kunya): Abū Saʿīd, Abū al-Qāsim, Abū ʿUmar أبو سعيد، أبو القاسم، أبو عمر
- Epithet (Laqab): Warsh ورش
- Toponymic (Nisba): al-Miṣrī al-Qurashī المصري القرشي

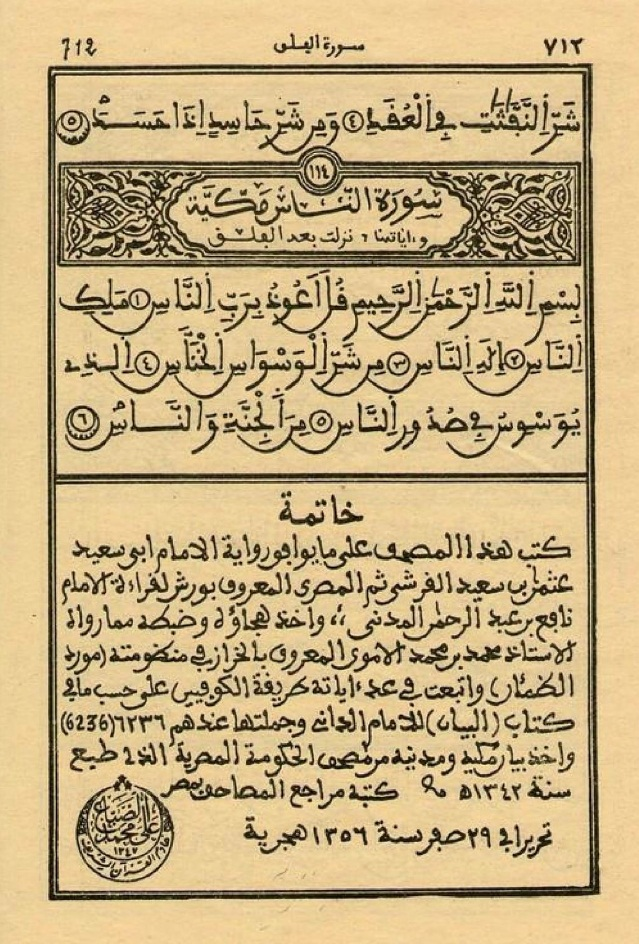
The end of Thaalibia Quran printed in Warsh's narration.

ʿUthmān ibn Saʿīd ibn ʿAbdullāh ibn ʿAmr ibn Sulaymān ibn Ibrāhīm al-Qurashī al-Miṣrī (Arabic: عثمان ابن سعيد ابن عبدالله ابن عمرو ابن سليمان ابن إبراهيم القرشي المصري, 110 AH / 728 CE - 197 AH / 813 CE) commonly known by his epithet Warsh ([/warʃ/]) was an Egyptian scholar of Qurʾānic recitation and one of the two principal transmitters of the reading (qirāʾah) of Nāfiʿ al-Madanī, the other being Qālūn. He is known by the nickname (laqab) Warsh, given to him by his teacher Nāfiʿ in reference to his striking fair complexion.

Born and raised in Egypt, Warsh traveled to Madīnah in 155 AH to study under Nāfiʿ, with whom he completed multiple full recitations of the Qurʾān. He returned to Egypt, where he established a recitation place (maqraʾ) that bore his name and became the foremost authority in Qurʾānic recitation in the region. His transmission was carried forward primarily through two students, Abū Yaʿqūb al-Azraq and Muḥammad ibn ʿAbd al-Raḥīm al-Aṣbahānī, the latter's path being the most widely recited today.

The recitation of Warsh spread across North and West Africa through the influence of Andalusian and Mālikī scholarship, and remains to this day the dominant mode of Qurʾānic recitation in Morocco, Algeria, Mauritania, and much of West Africa. It has also shaped the orthographic conventions of ʿAjamī writing systems across the Sahel and West Africa. He died in Cairo in 197 AH / 813 CE and was reburied in November 2025 behind the dome of Imām al-Shāfiʿī, where a new dome was constructed for him.

== Biography ==
=== Name and epithet ===
His name was ʿUthmān ibn Saʿīd. His kunyah was Abū Saʿīd. He became known by the nickname (laqab) Warsh, given to him by his teacher Nāfiʿ. One view holds that the word refers to a substance derived from milk, alluding to his very fair complexion. Another view traces it to Warshān, a type of bird resembling a white pigeon, alluding either to his appearance or his distinctive gait.

Nāfiʿ used to say: "Bring him here, O Warshān; read, O Warshān; where is the Warshān?" The name was later shortened to Warsh. Warsh himself was fond of the nickname and is reported to have said: "It was my teacher Nāfiʿ who named me thus."

=== Birth ===
Warsh was born in 110 AH (728 CE) in Qift, a town in Upper Egypt. Although born and raised in Egypt, his family origins are said to trace back to al-Qayrawān, modern-day Tunisia. From an early age, he distinguished himself in the recitation of the Qurʾān and in the Arabic language, gaining recognition among the reciters of Egypt before his journey in pursuit of advanced study.

=== Journey to Madinah and Study under Nāfiʿ ===
In 155 AH, Warsh traveled from Egypt to Medīnah with the sole purpose of studying Qurʾānic recitation under Nāfiʿ. Upon arrival, he attended Nāfiʿ's teaching circle, but found that it was not possible to read to him directly due to the large number of students.

Warsh sat behind the circle and asked a man who the most important person with Nāfiʿ was. He was told it was the elder of the Jaʿfar clan. Warsh went to his house and requested him to act as his intermediary with Nāfiʿ. The elder agreed, accompanied him to Nāfiʿ, and introduced him, saying that this man had come from Egypt solely to study recitation.

At his request, Nāfiʿ permitted Warsh to spend the night in the Prophet's Mosque, and the following day accepted him into his study circle. Nāfiʿ would teach thirty verses at a time to those already in his circle. Two students each gave up ten of their verses, allowing Warsh to recite fifty verses per day. By the end of his studies, Nāfiʿ had also begun to receive recitations from Warsh in private sessions. Warsh completed multiple full recitations under him before leaving Madīnah.

=== Teaching Career in Egypt ===
After completing his studies, Warsh returned to Egypt, where he became a leading authority in Qurʾānic recitation and attracted numerous students. He is reported to have established a dedicated recitation place (maqraʾ) known as Maqraʾ Warsh.

His students included Aḥmad ibn Ṣāliḥ, Dāwūd ibn Abī Ṭaybah, Abū al-Rabīʿ Sulaymān, ʿĀmir ibn Saʿīd, Abū al-Ashʿath al-Jarshī, ʿAbd al-Ṣamad ibn ʿAbd al-Raḥmān ibn al-Qāsim, Muḥammad ibn ʿAbd Allāh ibn Yazīd al-Makkī, Yūnus ibn ʿAbd al-Aʿlā, ʿUmar ibn Bashshār, Abū Yaʿqūb al-Azraq and ʿAbd al-Raḥīm ibn Saʿīd al-Aṣbahānī among others.

=== Characteristics and Recitation Style ===
Warsh was described as having very fair skin, blue eyes, and a short stature with a moderately full build. He used to wear short clothes and when walking his legs were uncovered. He was especially renowned for his beautiful and captivating recitation, which listeners found both powerful and pleasing. It was reported that those who listened to him would not grow weary.

=== Transmission ===
His transmission was carried forward by two students: Abū Yaʿqūb Yūsuf ibn ʿAmr al-Madanī al-Miṣrī (d. 240 AH) and Muḥammad ibn ʿAbd al-Raḥīm ibn Saʿīd al-Aṣbahānī (d. 296 AH). The path of al-Aṣbahānī is the most widely recited today.

=== Death and Burial ===
Warsh died in Cairo, Egypt in 197 AH / 813 CE, during the reign of the Caliph al-Maʾmūn, at the age of 87. He was buried in the Al-Qarāfa cemetery, in the Qarafa al-sughra, within the Imam al-Shāfiʿī Qarāfa, at the foot of Mount al-Muqaṭṭam, later incorporated into the courtyard of the Abdel Fattah Bek Moharram family.

In 2023, news circulated claiming that the grave of Warsh was slated for removal as part of development projects targeting the area, prompting widespread discussion on Egyptian social media. On 22 May 2023, images spread showing the tomb bearing a removal marker, indicating planned demolition and transfer of his remains, which prompted international concern.

Researcher Sayyid ʿAlī reported that his attempt to reach the grave proved extremely difficult due to a heavy security cordon imposed on the area, where demolition operations were already reportedly underway. Al-Jazeera reported that heritage-preservation associations had failed to establish communication with the responsible authorities in order to halt the demolition and that the entities carrying out the demolition possessed broad powers and did not respond to inquiries from antiquities experts. Egypt's Ministry of Tourism and Antiquities disclaimed responsibility for the decision to demolish the grave, stating that the site is not registered under Islamic Antiquities and that they have nothing to do with the demolition decision.

The reported action was strongly condemned by numerous scholars and members of the public. Some researchers urged the Moroccan government to intervene and transfer Warsh's remains either to Fez or to the Hassan II Mosque in Casablanca.

In August 2023, the Cairo Governorate denied the removal of the tomb of Warsh. The Governorate affirmed that these claims were "completely unfounded and untrue" and released photographs showing the grave intact.

In November 2025, Warsh was reburied in a new location behind the Imām al-Shāfiʿī dome, where a new modern dome was constructed for him alongside Wakīʿ ibn al-Jarrāḥ.

== Warsh recitation ==
Warsh 'an Naafi' is one of the main canonical methods of reciting the Qur'an. The recitations of the Quran, known in Arabic as Qira'at, are conducted under the rules of the Tajwid Science. It is attributed to Imam Warsh who in turn got it from his teacher Nafi‘ al-Madani who was one of the transmitters of the seven recitations. The recitation of Warsh 'an Naafi' is one of two major recitation traditions. The second is Hafs 'an 'Asim

== History ==
The recitation of Nāfiʿ was preferred by Mālik ibn Anas and his student ʿAbd Allāh ibn Wahb, and it remained the standard recitation of Medina for an extended period. However, according to Ibn al-Jazarī, in the 8th century, it was still practised by only a "selected few" in Africa.

The transmission of the Warsh recitation to the western Islamic lands is associated with Ghāzī ibn Qays al-Andalusī (d. 815), who travelled from Córdoba to Medina and studied directly under Nāfiʿ. He is reported to have carefully reviewed and corrected his muṣḥaf, comparing it thirteen times with the copy of Imām Nāfiʿ. Because Al-Andalus was a major centre of learning, its scholarly authority influenced the Maghreb; when Andalusian scholars adopted the Warsh recitation, it subsequently spread throughout North and West Africa.

Muḥammad ibn Khayrūn (d. 919) is also credited with bringing Nāfiʿ's qirāʾah to North Africa after travelling to Egypt. Ibn Khayrūn became a prominent qāriʾ and attracted students from across the Islamic world. His student al-Bajāʾī al-Jazāʾirī also played an important role in transmitting Nāfiʿ's recitation in the Algerian regions, ensuring it spread westward across North Africa.

According to Dr. ʿAbd al-Hādī, in 234 AH, when Saḥnūn ibn Saʿīd was appointed as Qadi in Qayrawan, he used his official power to favour the recitation of Nāfiʿ. Since the Mālikī school grounds its legal methodology in the practice of the people of Madīnah, Saḥnūn held that the Qurʾānic recitation used in the courts and mosques should likewise be the recitation of the people of Madīnah, namely that of Nāfiʿ.

Because fiqh and qirāʾāt were traditionally taught together, the rise of the Mālikī school as the dominant legal authority in the Maghreb had direct consequences for recitational practice. Once Mālikī fiqh became the law of the courts and the state, the recitation of Nāfiʿ came to be treated as the standard mode of Qurʾānic recitation in mosques and educational institutions across the region.

Historically, the Warsh qirāʾah was also prevalent in Egypt until the Ottoman period in the sixteenth century, after which the recitation of Ḥafṣ gradually became the dominant and dominant reading.

The qirāʾah of Warsh is widely recited in North and West Africa. It is the dominant recitation in Algeria, Morocco, Mauritania, and much of West Africa, including Senegal, Niger, Mali and Nigeria, among others. It is also used in some regions of Sudan (notably Darfur and Dongola), Egypt, Libya, Chad and Tunisia.

Muṣḥafs according to the Warsh recitation are printed in several countries, including Saudi Arabia, Morocco, Algeria, Syria, and Qatar. According to Maḥmūd Khalīl al-Ḥuṣarī (d. 1980), he was the first qāriʾ to produce a complete audio recording of the Qurʾān according to the Warsh qirāʾah. Warsh's recitation was also the qira'ah taught within the African Maḥaẓra Educational system.

Among the most notable tafsīr works written in Warsh ʿan Nāfiʿ qirāʾah are by ʿAbd al-Raḥmān al-Thaʿālibī, ʿAbd al-Ḥamīd ibn Bādīs, and Abū Bakr al-Jazāʾirī.

== Influence ==
In the modern period, the Kingdom of Morocco has officially recognised the riwāyah of Warsh as part of the country’s religious and cultural heritage. It has also influenced the phonological structure of some words in Algerian Arabic (Dārija).

Warsh recitation also played a formative role in shaping how many African languages were written in Arabic script (ʿAjamī). Because Warsh was the standard taught in local Qurʾānic schools, its orthographic conventions, including unique characters and diacritics, became a ready “pool of forms” for scholars when adapting Arabic script to represent sounds not found in Classical Arabic.

In Hausa, Fulfulde, and Tuareg ʿAjami systems, features such as the Warsh dot for [/e/] and other graphical variants were adopted to encode vowel and consonant distinctions absent in the Arabic linguistic system.

Sufi orders such as the Tijāniyya and Qādiriyya also transmitted ʿAjami texts in Warsh-derived orthography, and this influence persists in modern publications, such as the Fulfulde Bible (Deftere Allah), which retains elements of the Maghribī-style scripts associated with the Warsh tradition.

== Comparison of Warsh and Hafs recitation ==
The Warsh 'an Naafi' recitation of the Quran differs from Hafs 'an Asim in some orthography. The majority of differences do not affect the meaning. Yet in some cases the differences change the implications of the verse. In verse 2:184 Hafs recites the verse to be "... a ransom [as substitute] of feeding a poor person...". On the other hand, Warsh reads it "... a ransom [as substitute] of feeding poor people..." Other variants that go beyond orthography include :

رواية ورش عن نافع	رواية حفص عن عاصم	Ḥafs	Warsh	Chapter and Verse
يَعْمَلُونَ	تَعْمَلُونَ	you do	they do	Al-Baqara 2:85
وًأَوْصّى	وَوَصَّى	enjoined	instructed	Al-Baqara 2:132
سَارِعُوا	وَسَارِعُوا	And hasten to	Hasten to	Al 'imran 3:133
مَا تَنَزَّلُ	مَا نُنَزِّلُ	we do not send down...	they do not come down...	Al-Ḥijr 15:8
قُل	قَالَ	he said	say!	Al-Anbiyā' 21:4
كَثِيرًا	كَبِيرًا	mighty	multitudinous	Al-Aḥzāb 33:68
بِمَا	فَبِمَا	then it is what	it is what	Al-Shura 42:30
نُدْخِلْهُ	يُدْخِلْهُ	he makes him enter	we make him enter	Al-Fatḥ 48:17

رواية ورش عن نافع	رواية حفص عن عاصم	Ḥafs	Warsh	Chapter and Verse
مَلِكِ	مَالِكِ	Owner	King	Al-Fatihah Q1:4 (Q1:3 in Warsh)
يٌكَذّبُونَ	يَكْذِبُونَ	they lie	they were lied to (or) they deny	Al-Baqara Q2:10 (Q2:9 in Warsh)
قُتِلَ	قَاتَلَ	And many a prophet fought	And many a prophet was killed	Al 'imran Q3:146
سَاحِرَانِ	سِحْرَانِ	two works of magic	two magicians	Al-Qasas Q28:48

== See also ==
=== Ten readers and transmitters ===
- Nafi‘ al-Madani
  - Qalun
  - Warsh
- Ibn Kathir al-Makki
  - Al-Bazzi
  - Qunbul
- Abu 'Amr ibn al-'Ala'
  - Ad-Duri
  - Al-Susi
- Ibn Amir ad-Dimashqi
  - Hisham ibn Ammar
  - Ibn Dhakwan
- Aasim ibn Abi al-Najud
  - Shu'bah
  - Hafs
- Hamzah az-Zaiyyat
  - Khalaf
  - Khallad
- Al-Kisa'i
  - Al-Layth
  - Ad-Duri
- Abu Ja'far
  - 'Isa ibn Waddan
  - Ibn Jummaz
- Ya'qub al-Yamani
  - Ruways
  - Rawh
- Khalaf
  - Ishaq
  - Idris
