= Ibn Kathir al-Makki =

Yemeni transmitter of the seven canonical Qira'at (665–737)

Ibn Kathir (ابن كثير المكي) al-Makki
- Abdullah bin Kathir al-Makki
- Born: 665CE; 45AH; Mecca
- Died: 737CE; 120AH
- Other name: Abu Ma‘bad Abdullah al-‘Attar al-Dari

Abū Maʿbad (or Abū Bakr) ʿAbd Allāh ibn Kathīr al-Dārānī al-Makkī, better known as Ibn Kathir al-Makki (665–737 CE [45–120 AH]), was one of the transmitters of the seven canonical Qira'at, or methods of reciting the Qur'an. His recitations were generally popular among the people of Mecca.

== Biography ==
Al-Makki was born in Mecca and was one of the Tabi‘un. His family was of Iranian origin and were immigrants to Yemen. Al-Makki was a mawla ("freedman") of Amr ibn Alkama al-Kinani.

Al-Makki met the companions of Prophet Muhammad Anas ibn Malik and Abd Allah ibn al-Zubayr, and he learned his recitation method from a student of Prophet Muhammad's companion Abd Allah ibn Abbas who in turn learned from Ubay ibn Ka'b and Zayd ibn Thabit who both learned directly from Prophet Muhammad. Al-Shafi‘i, the namesake of one of the four primary schools of thought in Sunni Islam, preferred to recite the Qur'an according to al-Makki's method.

He died in the year 737CE. The two primary transmitters of his method of recitation, Al-Bazzi and Qunbul, were Persian and Meccan respectively.

== See also ==
=== Ten readers and transmitters ===
- Nafi‘ al-Madani
  - Qalun
  - Warsh
- Ibn Kathir al-Makki
  - Al-Bazzi
  - Qunbul
- Abu 'Amr ibn al-'Ala'
  - Ad-Duri
  - Al-Susi
- Ibn Amir ad-Dimashqi
  - Hisham ibn Ammar
  - Ibn Dhakwan
- Aasim ibn Abi al-Najud
  - Shu'bah
  - Hafs
- Hamzah az-Zaiyyat
  - Khalaf
  - Khallad
- Al-Kisa'i
  - Abu al-Harith
  - Ad-Duri
- Abu Ja'far
  - 'Isa ibn Waddan
  - Ibn Jummaz
- Ya'qub al-Yamani
  - Ruways
  - Rawh
- Khalaf
  - Ishaq
  - Idris
