= Abu Abd al-Rahman Abd Allah ibn Habib al-Sulami =

Islamic scholar (died c. 693)

‘Abdullāh ibn Ḥabīb
- Title: Al-Qāri’

Personal life
- Died: 74 AH Al-Kūfah
- Parent: Ḥabīb ibn Rabī‘ah As-Sulamī (father)
- Known for: Tābi‘

Religious life
- Religion: Islām
- School: Great Mosque of Kufa
- Lineage: ‘Abdullāh ibn Ḥabīb ibn Rabī‘ah As-Sulamī Al-Kūfī

Senior posting
- Teacher: ‘Uthmān ibn ‘Affān, ‘Alī ibn Abī Ṭālib, Zaid ibn Thābit, ‘Abdullāh ibn Mas‘ūd, Ubayy ibn Ka‘b
- Based in: Al-Kūfah
- Students: ‘Āṣim ibn Abin-Najūd, Yaḥyā ibn Wathāb, ‘Aṭā’ ibn As-Sā’ib, Abdullāh ibn ‘Īsā ibn ‘Abdir-Raḥmān ibn Abī Lailā, Muḥammad ibn Abī Ayyūb, ‘Āmir Ash-Sha‘bī, Ismā‘īl ibn Abī Khālid

Abū ‘Abd al-Raḥmān ‘Abd Allāh ibn Ḥabīb ibn Rabī‘ah al-Sulamī (Arabic: أبو عبد الرحمن عبد الله بن حبيب بن ربيعة السُلميّ) was a blind ḥadīth narrator and qāriʾ (Qur’ān reciter) born during the lifetime of the Islamic prophet Muḥammad. His father, Ḥabīb ibn Rabī‘ah As-Sulamī, was a companion of Muḥammad. Abū ‘Abdir-Raḥmān As-Sulamī is thought to have died in either 73 AH (692/693 CE) or 74 AH (693/694 CE), in Bishr ibn Marwān province in Al-Kūfah.

Abū ‘Abdir-Raḥmān was known to have discussed the Qur’ān with Tajwīd, an ability he gained from ‘Uthmān, ‘Alī, Zaid ibn Thābit, Abdullāh ibn Mas‘ūd, and Ubayy ibn Ka‘b. He taught ‘Aṣim ibn Abin-Najūd, Yaḥyā ibn Wathāb, ‘Aṭā’ ibn As-Sā’ib, Abdullāh ibn ‘Īsā ibn ‘Abdir-Raḥmān ibn Abī Lailā, Muḥammad ibn Abī Ayyūb, ‘Āmir Ash-Sha‘bī, and Ismā‘īl ibn Abī Khālid. Beginning in the caliphate of ‘Uthmān ibn ‘Affān, he held classes showing the recitation of the Qur’ān to individuals in the Great Mosque of Al-Kūfah for many years until his death. Abū ‘Abdir-Raḥmān As-Sulamī never took payment for such recitations of the Qur’ān.

== See also ==
- Ḥafṣ
- Nāfi‘ Al-Madanī
- Warsh
- Ijazah
