= Seven readers =

The Seven readers (Arabic: القراء السبعة) are seven Qāriʾs who mastered the Qira'at and historically transmitted the Quran recitations in an approved and confirmed manner.

== Presentation ==
The seven readers are the most famous Qāriʾs (reciters) from whom the reading of the Quran has been transmitted, so that the reading of the words differed in some of the resources of the Quranic verses.

They belong to the third class of recitation (Arabic: طَبَقَاتُ الْقُرَّاءِ).

== History ==
There are ten recitations following different schools of qira'ates, each one deriving its name from a noted Quran reciter called qāriʾ.

These ten qira'ates are issued from the original seven which are confirmed (mutawatir) (Arabic: قِرَاءَاتٌ مُتَوَاتِرَةٌ) by these seven Quran readers who lived in the second and third century of Islam.

It is the scholar Abu Bakr Ibn Mujāhid, who lived in the fourth century of Islam, who first approved of these seven qira'at, so that the actual versions of Quran readings transmitted to us are part of the system of qira'at consisting in a hierarchy passing from qira'ates to riwayates who have turuq or lines of transmission, and passed down to wujuh.

The seven readings of the Qira'at were first limited and noted by Abu Bakr Ibn Mujāhid, who canonized them in the 8th century CE, in his book called Kitab al-Sab’ fil-qirā’āt.

Before Ibn Mujāhid, there was Abu Ubaid al-Qasim bin Salam, who was the first to gather the recitations of the seven mutawatir reciters.

In a poem with 1173 lines, the scholar Qasim ibn Firrū ibn Khalaf Al-Shatibi Al Andalusi, outlined the two most famous ways passed down from each of seven readers, whose title is Ash-Shatibiyyah and where he documented the rules of recitation of each one of these seven readers.

In addition, the scholar Ibn al-Jazari, wrote two other poems Al-Durra Al-Maa'nia (Arabic: الدرة المعنية) and Tayyibat Al-Nashr (Arabic: طيبة النشر), dealing with these seven readings in great detail.

== Readers ==
The seven confirmed Qāriʾs in the recitations are in chronological order by birth year:

1. Ibn Amir ad-Dimashqi (640 - 736 CE).
2. Ibn Kathir al-Makki (665 - 737 CE).
3. Nafiʽ al-Madani (689 - 785 CE).
4. Abu Amr of Basra (689 - 771 CE).
5. Hamzah az-Zaiyyat (699 - 772 CE).
6. Aasim ibn Abi al-Najud (700 - 745 CE).
7. Al-Kisa'i (737 - 805 CE).

== Rouwates ==
Each of the seven readers had disciples called Rouwates (Arabic: رُوَاة) who noted, narrated and transmitted the teachings of Qari in a version called Riwayah (Arabic: رِوَايَة).

The Rawi (Arabic: رَاوِي) or transmitter in turn had other disciples who traced secondary routes of transmission called "Tourouq" of recitation (Arabic: طَرِيق) or Ways.

Theologians have counted a number approaching the 850 validated and confirmed Tourouq of Quranic recitation.

== See also ==
- Ahruf
- Qira'at
- Ten recitations
- Special recitations
