= Yahya ibn Adam =

Islamic scholar and jurist (d. 818)

Yahya Ibn Adam

Personal life
- Born: ≈ 140 AH / 757 CE Kufa
- Died: Mid-Rabi' al-Awwal 203 AH / Mid-September 818 CE Famm al-Silah
- Children: Zakariyyah
- Notable work: Kitāb al-Kharāj

Religious life
- Religion: Islam
- Arabic name
- Personal (Ism): Yaḥyā يحيى
- Patronymic (Nasab): ibn Ādam ibn Sulaymān بن آدم بن سليمان
- Teknonymic (Kunya): Abū Zakariyyā أبو زكريا
- Toponymic (Nisba): Al-Qurashī Al-Umawī Al-Kūfī القرشي الأموي الكوفي

Abū Zakariyyāʾ Yahyā ibn Ādam ibn Sulaymān al-Qurashī al-Umawī al-Ahwal al-Kūfī (Arabic: أبو زكريا يحيى بن آدم بن سليمان القرشي الأموي الأحول الكوفي) commonly known as Yahya Ibn Adam was an Islamic scholar, Hafiz, Quran Reciter and a jurist of Persian origins born and raised in Kufa.

He was best known for being an authority in hadith, Qur’anic recitation (Qira'at), and jurisprudence, Yahya was a non-sectarian legal scholar during the formative period of Islamic schools. He is known for transmitting the Qira'at of Aasim from Shu'bah. His notable book Kitāb al-Kharāj is described as "foundation stone of the traditionalistic school of economic thinking".

== Early life and background ==
Yahya ibn Adam was born sometime after the year 130 AH/748 CE in the city of Kufa in present-day Iraq. He was of Persian lineage. His nisbas –al-Umawī and al-Makhzūmī – reflect him being a freedman of Khalid ibn Khalid ibn ʿUqbah ibn Abī Muʿayṭ, an Umayyad from Banu Makhzum of the Quraysh tribe.

Yahya was raised as an orphan, and is father likely died before his birth. He was raised in Kufa. He was also known by his nickname Al-Ahwal (the cross-eyed) and his kunya Abū Zakariyyāʾ (Father of Zakariyya).

== Religious scholarship ==
=== Hadith and jurisprudence ===
Yahya ibn Adam was a leading authority in hadith and jurisprudence during his time. Yahya is often described as a non-sectarian jurist, dedicated to an evidence-based and tradition-oriented approach to Islamic law. Although he witnessed the emergence and consolidation of the two major Sunni legal schools – the Hanafi and Maliki schools – he did not adhere to either. He is known to have explicitly opposed Malik Ibn Anas in at least one of his writings and also critiqued the views of Abu Hanifa, though without naming him directly.

=== Qira'at ===
Yahya ibn Adam also transmitted the Qira'at of Aasim ibn Abi al-Najud through Shu'bah. He also narrated the Qira'at of al-Kisa'i.

He learned the Quran from Shu'bah for forty years. Yahya said in a report:

“I asked Abu Bakr ibn ‘Ayyash about the letters of ‘Asim in this notebook for forty years, and he narrated them all to me, letter by letter. I dotted them, recorded them, and wrote their meanings exactly as he explained to me. Then he said: ‘‘Asim recited them to me just as I’ve told you, letter by letter.’”

Many learned the Quran from him including Ahmad ibn Hanbal, Ahmad ibn ‘Umar al-Wakī‘ī, Shu‘ayb ibn Ayyub al-Sarīfīnī, Abu Hamdun al-Tayyib ibn Isma‘il and Khalaf ibn Hisham al-Bazzar.

Among those who transmitted the Qira'at of ‘Asim from him were: Shu‘ayb ibn Ayyub al-Sarifini, Abu Hamdun al-Tayyib ibn Isma‘il and ‘Abd Allah ibn Muhammad ibn Shakir among others.

== Works ==
Although Yahya ibn Adam is credited with authoring several works, only one has survived today:

- Kitāb al-Kharāj – A foundational work on taxation in Islamic law, particularly agriculture and its land tax. It is one of the earliest extant treatises dedicated to this topic.

His other known works, now lost, include:

- Kitāb al-Qirā’āt (The Book of Qur'anic Readings)

For almost forty years, Yahya recorded Abu Bakr Ibn Ayyash's reports on his Quranic recitation which also constituted one of the written sources of Aasim ibn Abi al-Najud (d. 127/745) version, entitled Kitāb al-Qirāāt

- Kitāb Mujarrad Aḥkām al-Qur’ān (The Abstraction of Qur'anic Rulings)
- Kitāb al-Farā’iḍ (The Book on Inheritance Law)
- Kitāb al-Zawāl (The Book on the Onset of Midday Prayer)

== Death ==
Yahya ibn Adam died as a stranger in Famm al-Silah during mid-Rabi' al-Awwal 203 AH (mid-September 818 CE), in his seventies.
