= Nafiʽ al-Madani =

Transmitter of the seven canonical Qira'at (689–785)

al-Madani Nafiʽ (نافع)

Personal life
- Born: 689CE; 70AH Madina
- Died: 785CE; 169AH Madina
- Main interest: Quran
- Other name: Abu Ruwaym Ibn ʽAbd ar-Rahman Ibn Abi Naʽim al-Laythi

Religious life
- Religion: Islam

Abu Ruwaym Ibn ʽAbd ar-Rahman Ibn Abi Naʽim al-Laythi (Arabic: أبو رويم بن عبدالرحمن بن أبي النعيم الليثي)(70-169AH), better known as Nafiʽ al-Madani, was one of the transmitters of the seven canonical Qira'at, or methods of reciting the Qur'an. Outside of Egypt, his method of Qur'an recitation is the most popular in Africa in general, and his chain of narration returning to the companions of the Islamic prophet Muhammad is well-attested.

Nafiʽ was born in the year 689CE, and he died in the year 785CE. His family was from Isfahan, though he himself was born and died in Medina.

His method of recitation via his two most famous students, Qalun and Warsh, is the most common Quran reading mode in North Africa, West Africa and Qatar. He had a total of four canonical transmitters of his recitation; in addition to Qalun and Warsh, he also transmitted his reading to Isma'il bin Ja'far al-Ansari and Ishaq bin Muhammad al-Musayyabi. Nafi's style of reading became so popular that it eventually eclipsed that of his teachers in Medina.

== See also ==
=== Ten readers and transmitters ===
- Nafi‘ al-Madani
  - Qalun
  - Warsh
- Ibn Kathir al-Makki
  - Al-Bazzi
  - Qunbul
- Abu 'Amr ibn al-'Ala'
  - Ad-Duri
  - Al-Susi
- Ibn Amir ad-Dimashqi
  - Hisham
  - Ibn Dhakwan
- Aasim ibn Abi al-Najud
  - Shu'bah
  - Hafs
- Hamzah az-Zaiyyat
  - Khalaf
  - Khallad
- Al-Kisa'i
  - Al-Layth
  - Ad-Duri
- Abu Ja'far
  - 'Isa ibn Wardan
  - Ibn Jummaz
- Ya'qub al-Hadhrami
  - Ruways
  - Rawh
- Khalaf
  - Ishaq
  - Idris
