= Qira'at =

Method of recitation of the Quran

In Islam, qirāʼa (pl. qirāʼāt; Arabic: قراءات, 'recitations' / 'readings') refers to the ways or fashions that the Quran, the holy book of Islam, is recited. More technically, the term designates the different linguistic, lexical, phonetic, morphological and syntactical forms permitted with reciting the Quran.

Differences between qiraʼat include varying rules regarding the prolongation, intonation, and pronunciation of words, but also differences in stops, (Note: for example, in Surat al-Baqara (1): "Dhalika'l-Kitabu la rayb" or "Dhalika'l-Kitabu la rayba fih") vowels, (Note: an example being "suddan" or "saddan") consonants (Note: (due to different diacritical marks, for example, yaʼ or taʼ (turjaʼuna or yurjaʼuna) or a word having a long consonant or not (a consonant will have a shadda making it long, or not have one).) (leading to different pronouns and verb forms), entire words (Note: For example "fa-tabayyanu" (فتبينوا) or "fa-tathabbatu" (فتثبتوا) in Q4.94 (which originally written in Uthmanic script as "ڡىىىىـوا"), both words mean "clarify" or "confirm". However, the variations don't change the overall message or doctrinal meanings of the Qur'an, as the differences are often subtle and contextually equivalent. These two words, while having different roots, convey similar meanings: fa-tabayyanu means "verify" or "clarify," while fa-tathabbatu means "be sure" or "confirm." The Uthmanic script, which lacked full vowel markings and diacritical dots, allowed for slight differences in pronunciation and reading that were passed down through different Qirāʾāt traditions. Both fa-tabayyanu and fa-tathabbatu are accepted readings in the different canonical Qirāʾāt. In this case, the overall instruction is the same: believers are told to ensure clarity or confirmation before making decisions, particularly regarding news they receive.) and even different meanings. (Note: For example in the beginning of 12:90 for Qunbul (قَالُوا إِنَّكَ لَأَنتَ يُوسُفُ) or "They said "You are Joseph"" and in Hafs (قَالُوٓا۟ أَءِنَّكَ لَأَنتَ يُوسُفُ) or "They said "Are you Joseph?"" In Qunbul's recitation: قَالُوا إِنَّكَ لَأَنتَ يُوسُفُ translates as, "They said, 'You are indeed Joseph!'" This version indicates certainty and recognition of Joseph's identity. In Hafs' recitation: قَالُوا أَءِنَّكَ لَأَنتَ يُوسُفُ translates as, "They said, 'Is it really you, Joseph?'" This version suggests a sense of surprise or questioning, as though they are confirming their amazement. Although the two readings differ in tone and emphasis, the overall message of the verse remains consistent: Joseph's brothers are either recognizing or confirming his identity.) However, the variations do not change the overall message or doctrinal meanings of the Quran, as the differences are often subtle and contextually equivalent. Qiraʼat also refers to the branch of Islamic studies that deals with these modes of recitation.

Qiraʼat should not be confused with tajwid—the rules of pronunciation, intonation, and caesuras of the Quran. Each qira'a has its own tajwid. Qiraʼat are called readings or recitations because the Quran was originally spread and passed down orally, and though there was a written text, it did not include most vowels or distinguish between many consonants, allowing for much variation. (Qiraʼat now each have their own text in modern Arabic script.) (Note: most of the varieties are not commonly used but can be found on pdf with English translation at quranflash.com -- https://app.quranflash.com/?en) Qira'at are also sometimes confused with ahruf—both being readings of the Quran with "unbroken chain(s) of transmission going back to the Prophet". There are multiple views on the nature of the ahruf and how they relate to the qira'at, the general view being that caliph Uthman eliminated all of the ahruf except one during the 7th century CE. The ten qira'at were canonized by Islamic scholars in early centuries of Islam.

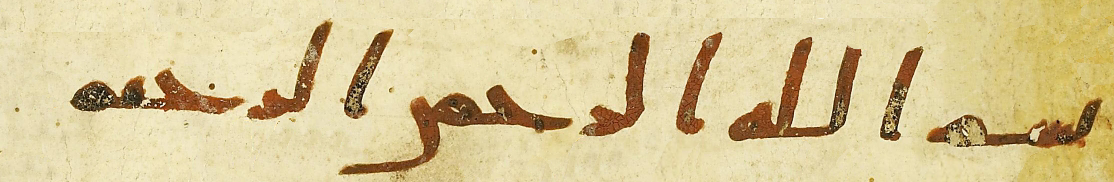
Birmingham manuscript shows the skeletal Arabic script of the Basmala: "ٮسم الله الرحمں الرحىم", and is one of the oldest surviving copies of Quranic pages.

Even after centuries of Islamic scholarship, the variants of the qira'at have been said to continue "to astound and puzzle" researchers into Islam (by Ammar Khatib and Nazir Khan), and along with ahruf make up "the most difficult topics" in Quranic studies (according to Abu Ammaar Yasir Qadhi). The qira'at include differences in consonantal diacritics (i'jām), vowel marks (ḥarakāt), and the consonantal skeleton (rasm), resulting in materially different readings (see examples).

The muṣḥaf Quran that is in "general use" throughout almost all the Muslim world today (Note: about 95% according to Muslimprophets website.) is the 1924 Cairo edition based on the qira'a (reading) of Ḥafṣ on the authority of `Āsim (Ḥafṣ being the rāwī, or "transmitter", and `Āsim being the qārī or "reader").

== History ==
Qiraat seven readers tree

According to Islamic belief, the Quran is recorded in the preserved tablet in heaven (Arabic: اللوح المحفوظ, romanized: al-lawh al-mahfooz), and was revealed to Muhammad by the angel Gabriel. There are ten recognised schools of qiraʼat, each one deriving its name from a noted Quran reciter or "reader" (qāriʾ pl. qāriʾūn or qurrāʿ), such as Nafi' al-Madani, Ibn Kathir al-Makki, Abu Amr of Basra, Ibn Amir ad-Dimashqi, Aasim ibn Abi al-Najud, Hamzah az-Zaiyyat, and Al-Kisa'i. While these readers lived in the second and third century of Islam, the scholar who approved the first seven qira'at (Abu Bakr Ibn Mujāhid) lived a century later, and the readings themselves have a chain of transmission (like hadith) going back to the time of Muhammad. Consequently, the readers (qurrāʿ) who give their name to qira'at are part of a chain of transmission called a riwāya. (Note: Thus it is more accurate to identify a qirāʼah of the Quran by saying "this is the riwaya of [insert name of reciter]", rather than "this is [insert name of reciter]". An example being, "this is the riwaya of Hafs", and not "this is Hafs" -- Hafs being the reading used by most of the Muslim world.) The lines of transmission passed down from a riwāya are called turuq, and those passed down from a turuq are called wujuh or awjuh (sing. wajh; Arabic: وجه, lit. 'face').

=== Quranic orthography ===
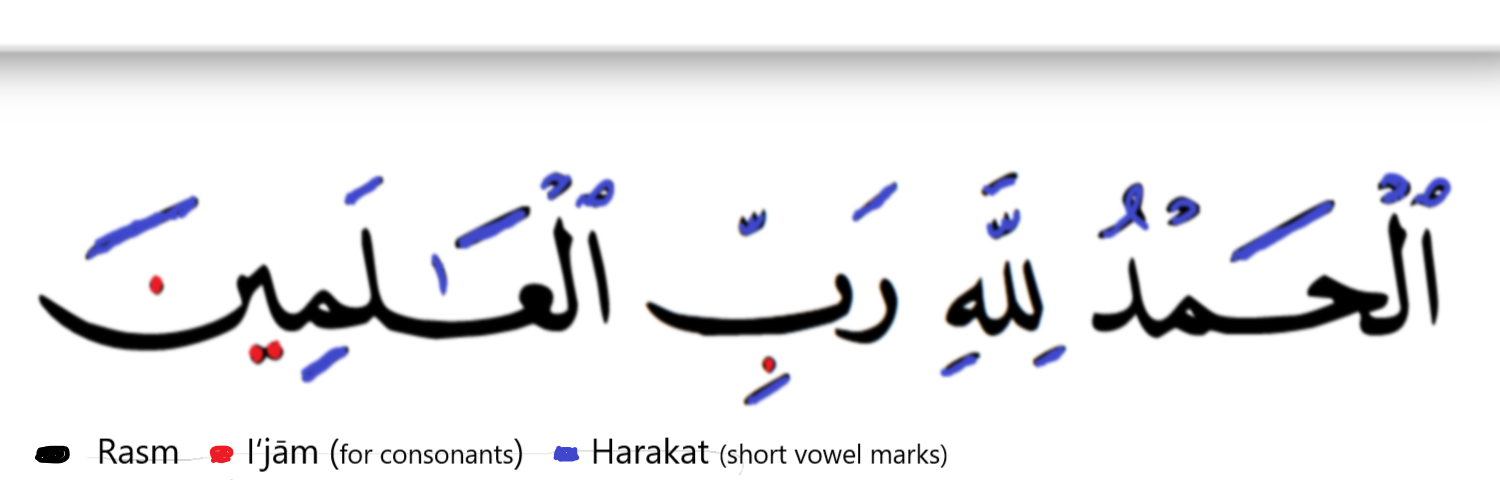
*Rasm -- also called "consonantal skeleton" -- (example in black) was the only script found in the earliest surviving fragments of the Quran. Most variations of the Quran that had different rasm were found in Ahruf variants. *I'jām or nuqat al-I'jam (examples in red) was added in later Arabic (possibly around 700 CE) so that letters (mostly consonants, such as these five letters ـبـ ـتـ ـثـ ـنـ ـيـ ; y, n, th, t, b) could be distinguished. *Ḥarakāt or nuqaṭ ali'rab (examples in blue) indicate other vocalizations—short vowels, nunization, glottal stops, long consonants. Variations among Qira'at mostly involve harakat.

Early manuscripts of the Quran did not use diacritics either for vowels (ḥarakāt) or to distinguish the different values of the rasm (I'jām') [see the graphic to the right], -- or at least used them "only sporadically and insufficiently to create a completely unambiguous text".

Gradual steps were taken to improve the orthography of the Quran, in the first century with dots to distinguish similarly-shaped consonants (predecessors to i'jām), followed by marks (to indicate different vowels, like ḥarakāt) and nunation in different-coloured ink from the text (Abu'l Aswad ad-Du'alî (d. 69 AH/688 CE). (Not related to the colours used in the graphic to the right.) Later the different colours were replaced with marks used in written Arabic today.

Adam Bursi has cautioned that details of reports that diacritics were added at the direction of al-Hajjaj under Caliph Abd al-Malik ibn Marwan are a "relatively late development" and that "While ʿAbd al-Malik and/or al-Ḥajjāj do appear to have played a role in the evolution of the qurʾānic text, the initial introduction of diacritics into the text was not part of this process and it is unclear what development in the usage of diacritics took place at their instigation." Manuscripts already used consonantal pointing sparingly, but at this time contain "no evidence of the imposition of the kind of fully dotted scriptio plena that the historical sources suggest was al-Ḥajjāj's intended goal", although "There is some manuscript evidence for the introduction of vowel markers into the Qurʾān in this period."

=== Recitations ===
Live recitation of Surah Yusuf, verses 1-22, in Hafs an Asim at a mosque in Richmond, Virginia, United States. The Hafs an Asim qira'a is the most used reading in the world.

In the meantime, before the variations were finally committed entirely to writing, the Quran was preserved by recitation from one generation to the next. Doing the reciting were prominent reciters of a style of narration who had memorized the Quran (known as hafiz). According to Csaba Okváth,

It was during the period of the Successors [i.e. the generation of Muslims succeeding the companions of Muhammad ] and shortly thereafter that exceptional reciters became renowned as teachers of Qur'anic recitation in cities like Makkah, Madina, Kufa, Basra, and greater Syria (al-Sham). They attracted students from all over the expanding Muslim state and their modes of recitations were then attached to their names. It is therefore commonly said that [for example] he recites according to the reading of Ibn Kathir or Nafi'; this, however, does not mean that these reciters [Ibn Kathir or Nafi] are the originators of these recitations, their names have been attached to the mode of recitation simply because their rendition of the Prophetic manner of recitation was acclaimed for authenticity and accuracy and their names became synonymous with these Qur'anic recitations. In fact, their own recitation goes back to the Prophetic mode of recitation through an unbroken chain.

Each reciter had variations in their tajwid rules and occasional words in their recitation of the Quran are different or of a different morphology (form of the word) with the same root. Scholars differ on why there are different recitations (see below). Aisha Abdurrahman Bewley gives an example of a line of transmission of recitation "you are likely to find ... in the back of a Quran" from the Warsh harf, going backwards from Warsh all the way to Allah himself:"[T]he riwaya of Imam Warsh from Nafi' al-Madini from Abu Ja'far Yazid ibn al-Qa'qa' from 'Abdullah ibn 'Abbas from Ubayy ibn Ka'b from the Messenger of Allah, may Allah bless him and grant him peace, from Jibril, peace be upon him, from the Creator."

After Muhammad's death there were many qira'at, from which 25 were described by Abu 'Ubayd al-Qasim ibn Sallam two centuries after Muhammad's death. The seven qira'at readings which are currently notable were selected in the fourth century by Abu Bakr Ibn Mujahid (died 324 AH, 936 CE) from prominent reciters of his time, three from Kufa and one each from Mecca, Medina, and Basra and Damascus. Later, three more recitations were canonized for ten. (The first seven readers named for a qiraa recitation died un/readers of the recitations lived in the second and third century of Islam. (Their death dates span from 118 AH to 229 AH).

Each reciter recited to two narrators whose narrations are known as riwaya (transmissions) and named after its primary narrator (rawi, singular of riwaya). (Note: There were two riwaya for each qira'a, but many more narrators who transmitted narrations from the qira'at. This twitter link gives a tree of fifteen narrators from one qira'a (Nafi' al-Madani, shown as "Nāfiʕ" at the top center). The two riwaya—Warsh (or Warš) and Qālūn—are on the left side mixed in with the other fifteen. Ibn Mujāhidat is at the bottom center of the tree, indicating he was aware of all the transmitters but picked Warsh and Qālūn as the riwaya.) Each rawi has turuq (transmission lines) with more variants created by notable students of the master who recited them and named after the student of the master. Passed down from turuq are wujuh: the wajh of so-and-so from the tariq of so-and-so. There are about twenty riwayat and eighty turuq.

In the 1730s, Quran translator George Sale noted seven principal editions of the Quran, "two of which were published and used at Medina, a third at Mecca, a fourth at Kufa, a fifth at Basra, a sixth in Syria, and a seventh called the common edition " He states that "the chief disagreement between their several editions of the Koran, consists in the division and number of the verses."

=== Reciting ===
Some of the prominent reciters and scholars in Islamic history who worked with qiraʼat as an Ilm al-Din (Islamic science) are:

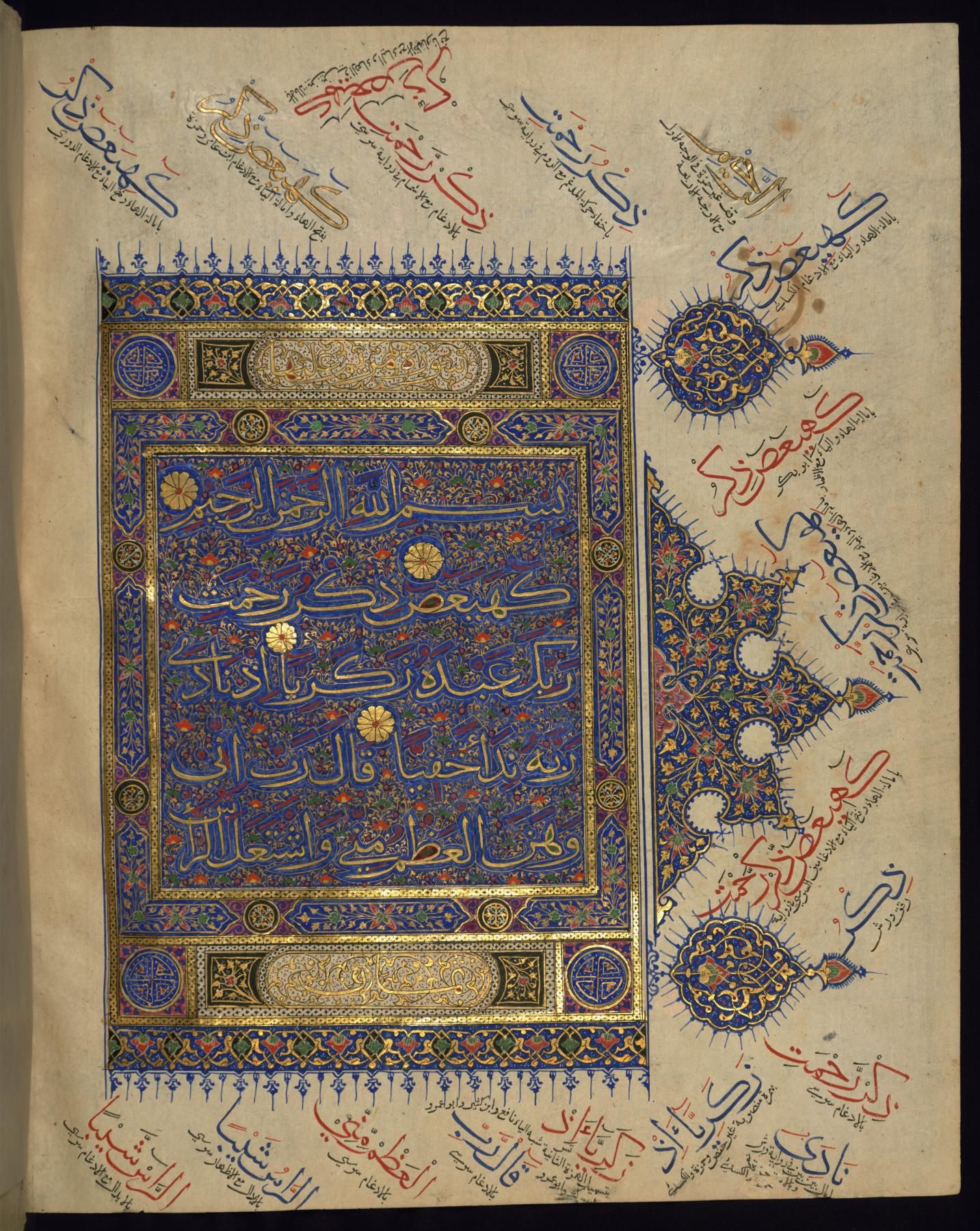
A 15th-century Quranic manuscript featuring marginal notes that provide different readings according to different Qira'ats and explanations of various phrases and words.

Abu Ubaid al-Qasim bin Salam (774 - 838 CE) was the first to develop a recorded science for tajwid (a set of rules for the correct pronunciation of the letters with all their qualities and applying the various traditional methods of recitation), giving the rules of tajwid names and putting it into writing in his book called al-Qiraat. He wrote about 25 reciters, including the seven mutawatir reciters. He made the recitation, transmitted through reciters of every generation, a science with defined rules, terms, and enunciation.

Abu Bakr Ibn Mujāhid (859 - 936 CE) wrote a book called Kitab al-Sab' fil-qirā'āt. He is the first to limit the number of reciters to the seven known. Some scholars, such as ibn al-Jazari, took this list of seven from Ibn Mujahid and added three other reciters (Abu Ja'far from Madinah, Ya'qub from Basrah, and Khalaf from Kufa) to form the canonical list of ten.

Imam Abu Ishaq al-Shatibi (1320 - 1388 CE) wrote a poem outlining the two most famous ways passed down from each of seven strong imams, known as al-Shatibiyyah. In it, he documented the rules of recitation of Naafi', Ibn Katheer, Abu 'Amr, Ibn 'Aamir, 'Aasim, al-Kisaa'i, and Hamzah. It is 1173 lines long and a major reference for the seven qira'aat.

Ibn al-Jazari (1350 - 1429 CE) wrote two large poems about qira'at and tajwid. One was Durrat Al-Maʿniyah (الدرة المعنية), in the readings of three major reciters, added to the seven in the Shatibiyyah, making it ten. The other is Tayyibat al-Nashr (طيبة النشر), which is 1014 lines on the ten major reciters in great detail, of which he also wrote a commentary.

== The readings ==
=== Criteria for canonical status ===
All accepted qira'at according to ibn al-Jazari follow three basic rules:

1. Conformity to the consonantal skeleton of the Uthmānic codex.
2. Consistency with Arabic grammar.
3. Authentic chain of transmission.

The qira'at that do not meet these conditions are called shādh (anomalous/irregular/odd). The other recitations reported from companions that differ from the Uthmānic codex may represent an abrogated or abandoned ḥarf, or a recitation containing word alterations for commentary or for facilitation for a learner. By contemporary consensus, it is not permissible to recite the shādh narrations in prayer, but they can be studied academically. The most well documented companion reading was that of 'Abdullah ibn Mas'ud. Ramon Harvey notes that Ibn Mas'ud's reading continued in use and was even taught as the dominant reading in Kufa for at least a century after his death and has shown that some of his distinctive readings continued to play a role in Hanafi fiqh. In 1937, Arthur Jeffery produced a compilation of variants attested in Islamic literature for a number of companion readings. More recently, Abd al-Latif al-Khatib made a much more comprehensive compilation of qira'at variants called Mu'jam al-Qira'at. This work is widely cited by academic scholars and includes ten large volumes listing variants attested in Islamic literature for the canonical readings and their transmissions, the companions, and other non-canonical reciters, mainly of the first two centuries. The process by which certain readings became canonical and others regarded as shaadhdh has been extensively studied by Shady Nasser.

=== The seven canonical qira'at ===
According to Aisha Abdurrahman Bewley, seven qira'at of ibn Mujahid are mutawatir ("a transmission which has independent chains of authorities so wide as to rule out the possibility of any error and on which there is consensus").

The seven readers and their transmitters
Qari (reader)					Rawi (transmitter)					
Name	Born	Died	Full name	Details	Name	Born	Died	Full name	Details	Current region
Nafi' al-Madani	70 AH	169 AH (785 CE)	Ibn 'Abd ar-Rahman Ibn Abi Na'im, Abu Ruwaym al-Laythi	Persian with roots from Isfahan.	Qalun	120 AH	220 AH (835 CE)	Abu Musa, 'Isa Ibn Mina al-Zarqi	Roman, Client of Bani Zuhrah	Libya and most of Tunisia
Nafi' al-Madani	70 AH	169 AH (785 CE)	Ibn 'Abd ar-Rahman Ibn Abi Na'im, Abu Ruwaym al-Laythi	Persian with roots from Isfahan.	Warsh	110 AH	197 AH (812 CE)	'Uthman Ibn Sa'id al-Qubti	Egyptian; client of Quraysh	Morocco, Algeria, Mauritania, the Sahel, West Africa, and some parts of Tunisia
Ibn Kathir al-Makki	45 AH	120 AH (738 CE)	'Abdullah, Abu Ma'bad al-'Attar al-Dari	Persian	Al-Bazzi	170 AH	250 AH (864 CE)	Ahmad Ibn Muhammad Ibn 'Abdillah, Abu al-Hasan al-Buzzi	Persian	Not commonly recited
Ibn Kathir al-Makki	45 AH	120 AH (738 CE)	'Abdullah, Abu Ma'bad al-'Attar al-Dari	Persian	Qunbul	195 AH	291 AH (904 CE)	Muhammad Ibn 'Abd ar-Rahman, al-Makhzumi, Abu 'Amr	Meccan and Makhzumi (by loyalty)	Not commonly recited
Abu 'Amr Ibn al-'Ala'	68 AH	154 AH (770 CE)	Zuban Ibn al-'Ala' at-Tamimi al-Mazini, al-Basri		Al-Duri	150 AH	246 AH (860 CE)	Abu 'Umar, Hafs Ibn 'Umar Ibn 'Abd al-'Aziz al-Baghdadi	Grammarian, blind	Sudan, Chad, Central Africa, East Africa, and parts of Yemen
Abu 'Amr Ibn al-'Ala'	68 AH	154 AH (770 CE)	Zuban Ibn al-'Ala' at-Tamimi al-Mazini, al-Basri		Al-Susi	173 AH	261 AH (874 CE)	Abu Shu'ayb, Salih Ibn Ziyad Ibn 'Abdillah Ibn Isma'il Ibn al-Jarud ar-Riqqi		Not commonly recited
Ibn Amir ad-Dimashqi	8 AH	118 AH (736 CE)	'Abdullah Ibn 'Amir Ibn Yazid Ibn Tamim Ibn Rabi'ah al-Yahsibi		Hisham	153 AH	245 AH (859 CE)	Abu al-Walid, Hisham ibn 'Ammar Ibn Nusayr Ibn Maysarah al-Salami al-Dimashqi		Parts of Yemen
Ibn Amir ad-Dimashqi	8 AH	118 AH (736 CE)	'Abdullah Ibn 'Amir Ibn Yazid Ibn Tamim Ibn Rabi'ah al-Yahsibi		Ibn Dhakwan	173 AH	242 AH (856 CE)	Abu 'Amr, 'Abdullah Ibn Ahmad al-Qurayshi al-Dimashqi		Not commonly recited
Aasim ibn Abi al-Najud	?	127 AH (745 CE)	Abu Bakr, 'Aasim Ibn Abi al-Najud al-'Asadi	Persian ('Asadi by loyalty)	Shu'bah	95 AH	193 AH (809 CE)	Abu Bakr, Shu'bah Ibn 'Ayyash Ibn Salim al-Kufi an-Nahshali	Nahshali (by loyalty)	Not commonly recited
Aasim ibn Abi al-Najud	?	127 AH (745 CE)	Abu Bakr, 'Aasim Ibn Abi al-Najud al-'Asadi	Persian ('Asadi by loyalty)	Hafs	90 AH	180 AH (796 CE)	Abu 'Amr, Hafs Ibn Sulayman Ibn al-Mughirah Ibn Abi Dawud al-Asadi al-Kufi		Middle East, most of Asia
Hamzah az-Zaiyyat	80 AH	156 AH (773 CE)	Abu 'Imarah, Hamzah Ibn Habib al-Zayyat al-Taymi	Persian (Taymi by loyalty)	Khalaf	150 AH	229 AH (844 CE)	Abu Muhammad al-Asadi al-Bazzar al-Baghdadi		Not commonly recited
Hamzah az-Zaiyyat	80 AH	156 AH (773 CE)	Abu 'Imarah, Hamzah Ibn Habib al-Zayyat al-Taymi	Persian (Taymi by loyalty)	Khallad	?	220 AH (835 CE)	Abu 'Isa, Khallad Ibn Khalid al-Baghdadi	Quraishi	Not commonly recited
Al-Kisa'i	119 AH	189 AH (804 CE)	Abu al-Hasan, 'Ali Ibn Hamzah al-Asadi	Persian (Asadi by loyalty)	Al-Layth	?	240 AH (854 CE)	Abu al-Harith, al-Layth Ibn Khalid al-Baghdadi		Not commonly recited
Al-Kisa'i	119 AH	189 AH (804 CE)	Abu al-Hasan, 'Ali Ibn Hamzah al-Asadi	Persian (Asadi by loyalty)	Al-Duri	150 AH	246 AH (860 CE)	Abu 'Umar, Hafs Ibn 'Umar Ibn 'Abd al-'Aziz al-Baghdadi	Transmitter of Abu 'Amr (see above)	Not commonly recited

=== "The Three after the Seven" ===
Bewley notes a further three qira'at, (sometimes known as "the three after the seven"), that provide additional variants. These three—named after Abu Jafar, Ya'qub and Khalaf—were added to the canonical seven centuries later by ibn al-Jazari (d.1429 CE) though they were popular since the time of the seven. They are mashhur (literally "famous", "well-known". "these are slightly less wide in their transmission, but still so wide as to make error highly unlikely").

The three mashhur qira'at added to the seven are:

The three readers and their transmitters
Qari (reader)					Rawi (transmitter)				
Name	Born	Died	Full name	Details	Name	Born	Died	Full name	Details
Abu Ja'far	?	130 AH	Yazid Ibn al-Qa'qa' al-Makhzumi al-Madani		'Isa Ibn Wardan	?	160 AH	Abu al-Harith al-Madani	Madani by style
Abu Ja'far	?	130 AH	Yazid Ibn al-Qa'qa' al-Makhzumi al-Madani		Ibn Jummaz	?	170 AH	Abu ar-Rabi', Sulayman Ibn Muslim Ibn Jummaz al-Madani	
Ya'qub al-Yamani	117 AH	205 AH	Abu Muhammad, Ya'qub Ibn Ishaq Ibn Zayd Ibn 'Abdillah Ibn Abi Ishaq al-Hadrami al-Basri	Client of the Hadramis	Ruways	?	238 AH	Abu 'Abdillah, Muhammad Ibn al-Mutawakkil al-Basri	
Ya'qub al-Yamani	117 AH	205 AH	Abu Muhammad, Ya'qub Ibn Ishaq Ibn Zayd Ibn 'Abdillah Ibn Abi Ishaq al-Hadrami al-Basri	Client of the Hadramis	Rawh	?	234 AH	Abu al-Hasan, Rawh Ibn 'Abd al-Mu'min, al-Basri al-Hudhali	Hudhali by loyalty
Khalaf	150 AH	229 AH	Abu Muhammad al-Asadi al-Bazzar al-Baghdadi	Transmitter of Hamza (see above)	Ishaq	?	286 AH	Abu Ya'qub, Ishaq Ibn Ibrahim Ibn 'Uthman al-Maruzi al-Baghdadi	
Khalaf	150 AH	229 AH	Abu Muhammad al-Asadi al-Bazzar al-Baghdadi	Transmitter of Hamza (see above)	Idris	189 AH	292 AH	Abu al-Hasan, Idris Ibn 'Abd al-Karim al-Haddad al-Baghdadi	

=== Other modes of recitation ===
In addition to the ten "recognized" or "canonical modes" there are four other modes of recitation: Ibn Muhaysin, al-Yazidi, al-Hasan and al-A'mash. These qira'at became unpopular over time as they all forgo one or more of ibn al-Jazari's criteria (mentioned above) and are now considered shadh (irregular/odd).

=== Hafs 'an 'Asim ===
One qira'a that has reached overwhelming popularity is the Hafs 'an 'Asim (i.e., the mode of ʿĀṣim ibn Abī al-Najūd (d. 127 AH) according to his student Ḥafs ibn Sulaymān (d. 180 AH)), specifically the standard Egyptian edition of the Quran first published on 10 July 1924 in Cairo. Its publication has been called a "terrific success", and the edition has been described as one "now widely seen as the official text of the Qur'an", so popular among both Sunni and Shi'a that the common belief among less-informed Muslims is "that the Qur'an has a single, unambiguous reading", namely the 1924 Cairo version. (A belief held, or at least suggested, even such scholars as the famous revivalist Abul A'la Maududi -- "not even the most sceptical person has any reason to doubt that the Qur'än as we know it today is identical with the Qur'än which Muhammad set before the world"—and the Orientalist A.J. Arberry -- "the Koran as printed in the twentieth century is identical with the Koran as authorized by 'Uthmän more than 1300 years ago"—both of whom make no mention of Qira'at and use the singular form in describing the Quran.) Another source states that "for all practical purposes", it is the one Quranic version in "general use" in the Muslim world today. (Note: Some other versions with minor divergences, namely those of Warsh (d.197/812) ....circulate in the northwestern regions of African.)

Among the reasons given for the overwhelming popularity of Hafs an Asim is that it is easy to recite and that God has chosen it to be widespread (Qatari Ministry of Awqaf and Islamic Affairs). Ingrid Mattson credits mass-produced printing press mushaf with increasing the availability of the written Quran, but also with making one version widespread (not specifically Hafs 'an 'Asim) at the expense of diversity of qira'at.

Gabriel Said Reynolds emphasizes that the goal of the Egyptian government in publishing the edition was not to delegitimize the other qira'at, but to eliminate variations found in Quranic texts used in state schools, and to do this they chose to preserve one of the fourteen qira'at "readings", namely that of Hafs (d. 180/796) 'an 'Asim (d. 127/745).

=== Variations among readings ===
==== Examples of differences between readings ====
Most of the differences between the various readings involve consonant/diacritical marks (I'jām) and marks (Ḥarakāt) indicating other vocalizations -- short vowels, nunization, glottal stops, long consonants. Differences in the rasm or "skeleton" of the writing are more scarce, since canonical readings were required to comply with at least one of the regional Uthmanic copies (which had a small number of differences).

According to one study (by Christopher Melchert) based on a sample of the ten qira'at/readings, the most common variants (ignoring certain extremely common pronunciation issues) are non-dialectal vowel differences (31%), dialectal vowel differences (24%), and consonantal dotting differences (16%). (Other academic works in English have become available that list and categorise the variants in the main seven canonical readings. Two notable and open access works are those of Nasser and Abu Fayyad.)

The first set of examples below compares the most widespread reading today of Hafs from Asim with that of Warsh from Nafi, which is widely read in North Africa. All have differences in the consonantal/diacritical marking (and vowel markings), but only one adds a consonant/word to the rasm: "then it is what" v. "it is what", where a "fa" consonant letter is added to the verse.

Ḥafs ʿan ʿĀṣim and Warš ʿan Nāfiʿ

(Warsh) رواية ورش عن نافع	رواية حفص عن عاصم (Hafs)	Ḥafs	Warsh	verse
يَعْمَلُونَ	تَعْمَلُونَ	you do	they do	Al-Baqara 2:85
مَا تَنَزَّلُ	مَا نُنَزِّلُ	We do not send down...	they do not come down...	Al-Ḥijr 15:8
لِيَهَبَ	لِأَهَبَ	that I may bestow	that He may bestow	Maryam 19:19
قُل	قَالَ	he said	Say!	Al-Anbiyā' 21:4
كَثِيرًا	كَبِيرًا	mighty	multitudinous	Al-Aḥzāb 33:68
بِمَا	فَبِمَا	then it is what	it is what	Al-Shura 42:30
نُدْخِلْهُ	يُدْخِلْهُ	He makes him enter	We make him enter	Al-Fatḥ 48:17
عِندَ	عِبَٰدُ	who are the slaves of the Beneficent	who are with the Beneficent	al-Zukhruf 43:19

While the change of voice or pronouns in these verse may seem confusing, it is very common in the Quran and found even in the same verse. (It is known as iltifāt.)

- Q.2:85 the "you" in Hafs refers to the actions of more than one person and the "They" in Warsh is also referring to the actions of more than one person.
- Q.15:8 "We" refers to God in Hafs and the "They" in Warsh refers to what is not being sent down by God (The Angels).
- Q.19:19 (li-ʾahaba v. li-yahaba) is a well known difference, both for the theological interest in the alternative pronouns said to have been uttered by the angel, and for requiring unusual orthography.
- Q.48:17, the "He" in Hafs is referring to God and the "We" in Warsh is also referring to God; this is due to the fact that God refers to Himself in both the singular form and plural form by using the royal "We".
- Q.43:19 shows an example of a consonantal dotting difference that gives a different root word, in this case ʿibādu v. ʿinda.

The second set of examples below compares the other canonical readings with that of Ḥafs ʿan ʿĀṣim. These are not nearly as widely read today, though all are available in print and studied for recitation.

Ḥafs ʿan ʿĀṣim and several other canonical readings

Ḥafs	Other reading	Ḥafs	Other readings	verse
وَأَرْجُلَكُمْ	[Abū ʿAmr] وَأَرْجُلِكُمْ	and (wash) your feet [accusative case]	and (rub with wet hands) your feet [genitive case]	Al-Māʾidah 5:6
عَلِمْتَ	[al-Kisāʾī] عَلِمْتُ	[Moses] said, "You have already known	[Moses] said, "I have already known	al-Isrāʼ 17:102
تُسَٰقِطْ	[Yaʿqūb] يَسَّٰقَطْ	[the tree] will drop	[the trunk] will drop	Maryam 19:25
يَبْصُرُوا۟	[Ḥamza] تَبْصُرُوا۟	He said, "I saw what they did not see	He said, "I saw what you did not see	Ṭā Hā 20:96
فُتِحَتْ	[Ibn ʿĀmir] فُتِّحَتْ]	has been opened	has been opened wide	Al-Anbiyā' 21:96
نَطْوِى ٱلسَّمَآءَ	[Abū Ǧaʿfar] تُطْوَى ٱلسَّمَآءُ	We will fold the heaven	will be folded the heaven	Al-Anbiyā' 21:104
جُدُرٍۭ	[Ibn Kaṯīr] جِدَارٍۭ	from behind walls	from behind a wall	Al-Hashr 59:14

- Q.5:6 The variant grammatical cases (wa-arjulakum and wa-arjulikum) were adopted for different exegetical views by Sunni and Shīʿi scholars, such that in wudu the feet were either to be washed or rubbed, respectively. The reading of Abū ʿAmr was shared by Ibn Kaṯīr, Šuʿba ʿan ʿĀṣim and Ḥamza.
- Q.17:102 and Q20:96 are examples of verbal prefix or suffix variants (the latter also read by al-Kisāʾī).
- Q.19:25 has a notably large number of readings for this word (four canonical readings with different subject or verb form, and several non-canonical).
- Q.21:104 is an example of active-passive variants.
- Q.21.96 is an example of a verb form variant, with Ibn ʿĀmir reading the more intensive verb form II.
- Q59.14 is an example of singular-plural variants (also read by Abū ʿAmr).

== Qira'at and Ahruf ==
=== Difference between them ===
Although both Qira'at (recitations) and Ahruf (styles) refer to readings of the Quran, they are not the same. Ahmad 'Ali al Imam (and Ammar Khatib and Nazir Khan) notes three general explanations, described by Ibn al-Jazari, of what happened to the Ahruf. One group of scholars, exemplified by Ibn Hazm, held that Uthman preserved all seven ahruf. Another group, exemplified by Al-Tabari, held that Uthman preserved only one of the seven, unifying the ummah under it. (Note: According to Ammar Khatib and Nazir Khan, "The opinion that the ʿUthmānic muṣḥaf selected one ḥarf was also the view of al-Naḥḥās (d. 338 AH), Ibn ʿAbd al-Barr (d. 463 AH), al-Abyārī (d. 616 AH), Ibn al-Qayyim (d. 751 AH), and many other scholars".) Finally, Ibn al-Jazari held what he said was the majority view, which is that the orthography of the Uthmanic copies accommodated a number of ahruf -- "some of the differences of the aḥruf, not all of them". (Note: According to Ammar Khatib and Nazir Khan, "Makkī ibn Abī Ṭālib (d. 437 AH), Ibn al-Jazarī (d. 833 AH), Ibn Ḥajar (d. 852 AH) and other scholars explained that what remained after the ʿUthmānic compilation were the differences from the other aḥruf that could still be accommodated by the skeletal text of the ʿUthmānic codices;Ibn Ḥajar cites Abū al-ʿAbbās ibn ʿAmmār al-Mahdawī (d. 430 AH) who states, 'The most correct position which is upheld by the experts is that what is recited now are some of [the differences] of the seven ḥurūf which were permitted to be recited and not all of them.')

Taking the second version of the history of the ahruf described above, Bilal Philips writes that Caliph 'Uthman eliminated six of the seven ahruf about halfway through his reign, when confusion developed in the outlying provinces about the Quran's recitation. Some Arab tribes boasted about the superiority of their ahruf, and rivalries began; new Muslims also began combining the forms of recitation out of ignorance. Caliph 'Uthman decided to make official copies of the Quran according to the writing conventions of the Quraysh and send them with the Quranic reciters to the Islamic centres. His decision was approved by the Companions of Muhammad, and all unofficial copies of the Quran were ordered destroyed; Uthman carried out the order, distributing official copies and destroying unofficial copies, so that the Quran began to be read in one harf, the same one in which it is written and recited throughout world today.

Philips writes that Qira'at is primarily a method of pronunciation used in recitations of the Quran. These methods are different from the seven forms, or modes (ahruf), in which the Quran was revealed. The methods have been traced back to Muhammad through a number of Companions who were noted for their Quranic recitations; they recited the Quran to Muhammad (or in his presence), and received his approval. These Companions included:

- Ubayy ibn Ka'b
- Ali Ibn Abi Talib
- Zayd ibn Thabit
- Abdullah ibn Masud
- Abu Darda
- Abu Musa al-Ash'ari

Many of the other Companions learned from them; master Quran commentator Ibn 'Abbaas learned from Ubayy and Zayd.

According to Philips, among the Successors (aka Tabi'in) generation of Muslims were many scholars who learned the methods of recitation from the Companions and taught them to others. Centres of Quranic recitation developed in al-Madeenah, Makkah, Kufa, Basrah and Syria, leading to the development of Quranic recitation as a science. By the mid-eighth century CE, a large number of scholars were considered specialists in the field of recitation. Most of their methods were authenticated by chains of reliable narrators, going back to Muhammad. The methods which were supported by a large number of reliable narrators (i.e. readers or qāriʾūn) on each level of their chain were called mutawaatir, and were considered the most accurate. Methods in which the number of narrators were few (or only one) on any level of the chain were known as shaadhdh. Some scholars of the following period began the practice of designating a set number of individual scholars from the previous period as the most noteworthy and accurate. The number seven became popular by the mid-10th century, since it coincided with the number of dialects in which the Quran was revealed (a reference to Ahruf).

Another (more vague) differentiation between Qira'at (recitations) and Ahruf (styles) offered by Ammar Khatib and Nazir Khan is "... the seven aḥruf are all the categories of variation to which the differences found within qirāʾāt correspond. In other words, they represent a menu of ingredients from which each qirāʾah selects its profile."

=== Scriptural basis for seven Ahruf ===
While different ahruf or variants of the Quran are not mentioned in the Quran, hadith do mention them. According to Bismika Allahuma, proof of the seven ahruf is found in many hadith, "so much so that it reaches the level of mutawaatir." One scholar, Jalaal ad-Deen as-Suyootee, said that twenty-one traditions of companions of Muhammad state "that the Qur'aan was revealed in seven ahruf". One hadith (reported in the Muwatta of Malik ibn Anas) has "Umar Ibn al-Khattab manhandling Hisham Ibn Hakim Ibn Hizam after what he (Umar) thinks is an incorrect reading of the Quran by Hisham. When Umar hauls Hisham to Muhammad for chastisement," where Hisham and Umar each recite for Muhammad, Umar is surprised to hear Muhammad say, "It was revealed thus", after each reading. Muhammad ends by saying: "It was revealed thus; this Quran has been revealed in seven Ahruf. You can read it in any of them you find easy from among them."

=== Disagreement ===
Javed Ahmad Ghamidi (and others) point out that Umar and Hisham belonged to the same tribe (the Quraysh), and members of the same tribe and would not have used different pronunciation. Supporters of the theory reply that Hisham may have been taught the Quran by a companion of Muhammad from a different tribe. Nevertheless, Ghamidi questions the hadith which claim "variant readings", on the basis of Quranic verses (87:6-7, 75:16-19), the Quran was compiled during Muhammad's lifetime and questions the hadith which report its compilation during Uthman's reign. Since most of these narrations are reported by Ibn Shihab al-Zuhri, Imam Layth Ibn Sa'd wrote to Imam Malik:

And when we would meet Ibn Shihab, there would arise a difference of opinion in many issues. When any one of us would ask him in writing about some issue, he, in spite of being so learned, would give three very different answers, and he would not even be aware of what he had already said. It is because of this that I have left him – something which you did not like.

Abu 'Ubayd Qasim Ibn Sallam (died 224 AH) reportedly selected twenty-five readings in his book. The seven readings which are currently notable were selected by Abu Bakr Ibn Mujahid (died 324 AH, 936 CE) at the end of the third century from prominent reciters of his time, three from Kufa and one each from Mecca, Medina, and Basra and Damascus. It is generally accepted that although their number cannot be ascertained, every reading is Quran which has been reported through a chain of narration and is linguistically correct. Some readings are regarded as mutawatir, but their chains of narration indicate that they are ahad (isolate) and their narrators are suspect in the eyes of rijal authorities.

== Questions and difficulties ==
=== Developing view of full authenticity ===
Professor Shady Nasser of Harvard University is the author of books and papers on the canonization process of the Quran. Nasser has explored examples of prominent early scholars and grammarians who regarded some variants that were later considered canonical to be wrong (not just wrongly transmitted) or preferred some variants over others. In particular, he gives examples of such views from the time shortly before canonization expressed by Al-Tabari, the grammarian Al-Farraʼ, and Ibn Mujahid in the very work in which he selected the 7 readings (Kitab al-Sab'a fil-qirā'āt, particularly his "critical remarks [...] against Ibn ʿĀmir, Ḥamza, and some canonical Rāwīs such as Qunbul". In one summary he states in reference to certain critics and examples (elaborated in earlier chapters) that "The early Muslim community did not unconditionally accept all these Readings; the Readings of Ḥamza, al-Kisāʾī, and Ibn ʿĀmir were always disparaged, criticized, and sometimes ridiculed."

Contrasting with the view of early scholars that the readings included human interpretation and errors, Nasser writes, "This position changed drastically in the later periods, especially after the 5th/11th century where the canonical Readings started to be treated as divine revelation, i.e. every single variant reading in the seven and ten eponymous Readings was revealed by God to Muhammad."

=== Disagreement on mutawatir transmission from Muhammad ===
Doctrine holds that the readings that make up each of the canonical Qira'at can be traced by a chain of transmission (like hadith) back to Muhammad, and even that they were transmitted by chains so numerous that their authenticity is beyond doubt (mutawatir). In theory, evidence of the canonical Qira'at should be found among the oldest Quranic manuscripts.

However, according to Morteza Karimi-Nia of the Encyclopaedia Islamica Foundation:

the seven variant readings attributed to the Seven Readers, which have been prevalent since the fourth/tenth century, are only rarely evident in the Qurʾānic manuscripts of the first two Islamic centuries. In these manuscripts, instead, one can find either the above-mentioned regional differences (as between Mecca, Medina, Kufa, Basra, or Damascus) or differences in lettering and dotting, which do not necessarily reflect the canonical variants of the Seven Readers but can be traced back to the readings of one of the Prophet's Companions or Followers."

The view of some scholars that the differences, not just the agreement, between the canonical qira'at were transmitted mutawatir was a topic of disagreement among scholars. Shady Nasser notes that "all the Eponymous Readings were transmitted via single strands of transmissions (āḥād) between the Prophet and the seven Readers, which rendered the tawātur of these Readings questionable and problematic." He observes that qira'at manuals were often silent on the isnad (chain of transmission) between the eponymous reader and the Prophet, documenting instead the formal isnads from the manual author to the eponymous reader. Like Ibn Mujahid, often they separately included various biographical accounts connecting the reading back to the Prophet, while later manuals developed more sophisticated isnads. Nasser concludes that "the dominant and strongest opinion among the Muslim scholars holds to the non-tawātur of the canonical Readings". Marijn van Putten has noted similarly that "The view that the transmission of the Quran is tawātur seems to develop some significant time after the canonization of the readers".

=== Struggles of the Qurrāʾ ===
The writings of Ibn Mujahid give a great deal of insight into the community of the Qurrāʾ (Arabic: "reciters"). In his book on Ibn Mujahid's Kitab al-Sab'a, Shady Nasser cites specific examples to make many observations on the difficulties that the eponymous readers and their transmitters are therein reported to have experienced, while emphasising that they were "driven by sincere piety and admiration for the Qurʾānic revelation" and "went to extreme measures to preserve, perform and stabilize the text". For example, when precise information was missing on part of a reading, "the Qurrāʾ resorted to qiyās (analogy)", as did Ibn Mujahid himself in documenting the readings transmitted to him. In other cases, canonical transmitters such as Shu'ba said he "did not memorize" how his teacher 'Asim read certain words, or Ibn Mujahid had conflicting or missing information. Accounts report what Nasser describes as incidents of "ambivalence and indecisiveness" by readers themselves such as Abu 'Amr, 'Asim and Nafi, while Ibn Mujahid often lacked certain information on Ibn Amir's reading. Nasser also notes examples recorded by Ibn Mujahid of readers such as Abu 'Amr, al Kisa'i, Nafi, and the transmitters of 'Asim, Hafs and Shu'ba, in certain cases "retracting a reading and adopting a new one", or Shu'ba recounting that he "became skeptical" of his teacher 'Asim's reading of a certain word and adopted instead that of a non-canonical Kufan reader (al-A'mash). He notes the case of Ibn Dhakwan finding one reading for a word in his book/notebook, and recalling something different in his memory. Nasser observes that "when in doubt, the Qurrāʾ often referred to written records and personal copies of the Qurʾān", sometimes requesting to see the copy belonging to someone else.

In his book on Quranic Arabic and the reading traditions (open access in pdf format), Marijn van Putten puts forth a number of arguments such that the qira'at are not purely oral recitations, but also to an extent are readings dependent on the rasm, the ambiguities of which they interpreted in different ways, and that the readings accommodated the standardized rasm rather than the other way around.

=== Arabic dialect of the Quran ===
Contrary to popular conceptions, the Quran was not originally codified in Classical Arabic, instead originating in the Old Hijazi dialect of Arabic. Linguist and Quranic manuscript expert Dr. Marijn van Putten has written a number of papers on the Arabic evident in the Quranic consonantal text (QCT). Van Putten brings internal linguistic arguments (internal rhymes) to show that this dialect had lost the hamza (except at the end of words spoken in the canonical readings with a final long ā), not just in the orthography of the written text, as is well established, but even in the original spoken performance of the Quran. He also notes Chaim Rabin's (d. 1996) observation of "several statements by medieval Arabic scholars that many important Hijazis, including the prophet, would not pronounce the hamza" and quotes his point that "the most celebrated feature of the Hijaz dialect is the disappearance of the hamza, or glottal stop". The canonical readings on the other hand use hamza much more widely and have considerable differences in its usage. In another paper, Van Putten and Professor Phillip Stokes argue, using various types of internal evidence and supported by early manuscripts and inscriptions of early dialects found in Arabia, that unlike the dialects found in the canonical readings, the spoken language behind the QCT "possessed a functional but reduced case system, in which cases marked by long vowels were retained, whereas those marked by short vowels were mostly lost". Van Putten also reconstructs the spoken dialect represented by the QCT to have treated nouns ending with feminine -at as diptotes (without nunation) rather than the triptotic feminine endings spoken in Quran recitations today.

A summary of these findings is given by van Putten in his book, Quranic Arabic: From Its Hijazi Origins to Its Classical Reading Traditions. In the concluding chapter, van Putten reiterates his overall argument that the Quran has been "reworked and 'Classicized' over time, to yield the much more Classical looking forms of Arabic in which the text is recited today". He suggests that "we can see traces of the Classical Arabic case system having been imposed onto the original language as reflected in the QCT, which had lost most of its word final short vowels and tanwīn".

Van Putten has further argued that no canonical reading maintains any particular dialect. Rather, through a process of imperfect transmission and explicit choices, the readers assembled their own readings of the Quran, with no regard as to whether this amalgamation of linguistic features had ever occurred in a single dialect of Arabic. In this way the readings came to have a mixed character of different dialectical features.

=== Recitation of scribal errors inherited from the original Uthmanic copies ===
In modern times some academic scholars have regarded descriptions by Muslim scholars of the 40 or so differences in the rasm (skeleton text) of the four copies of the Uthmanic codex sent out to Medina, Syria, and the garrison towns of Basra and Kufa, to be scribal errors in those copies, especially after Michael Cook (who expresses this view) established from these descriptions that they form a stemma (tree structure), widely considered to prove a written copying process. All subsequent manuscripts can be grouped into these regional families based on the inherited differences. Marijn Van Putten and Hythem Sidky have noted that the canonical readers strongly tended to include the differences found in the codex given to their region and adapted their readings accordingly, while Shady Nasser gives a somewhat more complex picture, with a more comprehensive list of the documented differences including those that are less well attested. He also identifies examples where different readers from the same town sometimes seem to have used codices from elsewhere. Hythem Sidky too notes some such examples, suggesting that as knowledge of regionally isolated variants proliferated, new options became available to the readers or that codices became contaminated through copying from multiple exemplars. He also finds that the less well attested variants in the rasm literature have a "poor agreement" with the regionality found in early manuscripts, whereas the well attested variants in the rasm literature (which form a stemma) have an "excellent agreement" with the manuscript evidence. He finds that "by all indications, documentation of the regional variants was an organic process", rather than being known at the time the codices were produced.

=== Misunderstanding ===
Using "qiraʼat"/"recitations" to describe Quranic variants may sound as though different reciters are reading from the same text (or reciting based on the same text) but with different "prolongation, intonation, and pronunciation of words"; or if their spoken words are different it's because they have the same consonants but different vowel markings (see orthography diagram above). (Ammar Khatib and Nazir Khan, for example, talk of the "basis of the qirāʾāt" being "words that can be read in multiple ways" rather than different words or word forms used in the same verse.)

However, not only do the written vowel markings and written consonant diacritical marks differ between qiraʼat, there are also occasional small but "substantial" differences in the "skeleton" of the script (rasm, see Examples of differences between readings) that Uthman reportedly standardized.

=== Rationale ===
According to Oliver Leaman, "the origin" of the differences of qira'at "lies in the fact that the linguistic system of the Quran incorporates the most familiar Arabic dialects and vernacular forms in use at the time of the Revelation." According to Csaba Okváth, "Different recitations [different qira'at] take into account dialectal features of Arabic language ..."

Similarly, the Oxford Islamic Studies Online writes that "according to classical Muslim sources", the variations that crept up before Uthman created the "official" Quran "dealt with subtleties of pronunciations and accents (qirāʿāt) and not with the text itself which was transmitted and preserved in a culture with a strong oral tradition."

On the other hand, Aisha Abdurrahman Bewley writes that different qirāʿāt have "different diacritical marks", and the differences "compliment other recitations and add to the meaning, and are a source of exegesis." Ammar Khatib and Nazir Khan contend that qirāʿāt "constitute a unique feature of the Quran that multiplies its eloquence and aesthetic beauty", and "in certain cases" the differences in qirāʾāt "add nuances in meaning, complementing one another."

=== Questions ===
Other reports of what Muhammad said (as well as some scholarly commentary) seem to contradict the presence of variant readings -- ahruf or qirāʾāt.

Abu Abd Al-Rahman al-Sulami writes, "The reading of Abu Bakr, Umar, Uthman and Zayd ibn Thabit and that of all the Muhajirun and the Ansar was the same. They would read the Quran according to the Qira'at al-'ammah. This is the same reading which was read out twice by the Prophet to Gabriel in the year of his death. Zayd ibn Thabit was also present in this reading [called] the 'Ardah-i akhirah. It was this very reading that he taught the Quran to people till his death". According to Ibn Sirin, "The reading on which the Quran was read out to the prophet in the year of his death is the same according to which people are reading the Quran today", which seems to contradict the recent Sanaa Mosque discoveries.

Examining the hadith of Umar's surprise in finding out "this Quran has been revealed in seven Ahruf", Suyuti, a noted 15th-century Islamic theologian, concludes the "best opinion" of this hadith is that it is "mutashabihat", i.e. its meaning "cannot be understood."

== See also ==
- Ahruf
- Ten recitations
- Seven readers
- Special recitations
- Hizb Rateb, in Sufism
- Salka, in Sufism
- Sermon, in Christianity
- Torah reading and cantillation in Judaism
