= Ubay =

Ubay may refer to:

- Ubay (name), a given name
- Ubay, Bohol, Philippines
  - Ubay Airport
  - Ubay Poblacion, barangay in the municipality of Ubay

== See also ==
- Ubaye, a river of southeastern France
- Ubaye Valley
