= Q104 =

Q104 can refer to:

- Quran 104, the 104th chapter of the Islamic Holy book
- Q104 (New York City bus)

== Radio stations ==
- CFRQ-FM in Halifax, Nova Scotia
- CJQM-FM in Sault Ste Marie, Ontario
- CKQV-FM in Vermilion Bay, Ontario
- WQAL in Cleveland, Ohio
- WAXQ in New York City
- KBEQ in Kansas City, Missouri
- WCKQ in Campbellsville, Kentucky
- WQCY in Quincy, Illinois
