= Ubay (name) =

- Arabic: أبي
- Romanization: Obai/Ubay/Ubai /Obay/Obayy/Ubayy
- Literal meaning: The one who is refusing the humiliation

Obai (Arabic: أبي) is an Arabic given name, most commonly transliterated as "Ubai". also It is also sometimes transliterated as "Obai", "Ubay", "Ubai", "Oubai", "Oubay", "Obay", "Ubayy", & "Obayy" The word is derived from the tri-consonant Arabic word for "refuse" and could possibly mean "The one who is refusing the humiliation".

The most well-known historical figure to be named Ubai was Ubay ibn Ka'b, a companion of the Islamic prophet Muhammad and a person of high esteem in the early Muslim community.

== People with the name ==
- Ubayy ibn Ka'b, Arabic companion of the Islamic prophet Muhammad
- Ubay Luzardo, Spanish footballer
