= Sulayman al-Aʽmash =

Islamic scholar (680 – 764/65)

Sulaiman al-Aʽmash

Personal life
- Born: 680 Kufa
- Died: 764 (aged 83–84) or 765 (aged 84–85) Kufa
- Main interest: Hadith

Religious life
- Religion: Islam

Abu Muhammad Sulayman ibn Mihran al-Asadi al-Kahili (680 – 764/65) (سليمان بن مهران) also known as al-Aʽmash (الأعمش) was a Muslim scholar of the generation of Tabi'un. He was a notable muhaddith and qāriʾ. Due to his poor eyesight, people used to call him al-Aʽmash.

== Biography ==
Al-A'mash was born in Kufa in 680 (61 AH). He was a freedman of the Kahil clan from the Banu Assad tribe. His father had moved to Kufa from Damavand, Iran.

Al-A’mash died in 764 (147 AH) in Kufa, but most historians say that he died in the month of Rabi al-Awwal 765 (148 AH).

His notable students include Abu Hanifa, Abdullah Ibn al-Mubarak, Sufyan al-Thawri, Sufyan ibn ʽUyaynah and Al-Fuḍayl ibn ʻIyāḍ.
