= Zayd ibn Thabit =

Arabic scribe and Qur'anic collator (c.611-c.666)

Zayd ibn Thābit زيد بن ثابت

Personal life
- Born: c. 611 C.E. Medina, Hejaz
- Died: c. 666 (aged 54–55) Medina, Rashidun Caliphate
- Parents: Thabit bin al-Dahhak (father); Al-Nawwaar bint Malik (mother)
- Occupation: Scribe, theologian

Religious life
- Religion: Islam

Zāyd bin Thābit (Arabic: زيد بن ثابت, romanized: Zayd ibn Thābit) was the personal scribe of the Islamic prophet Muhammad, serving as the chief recorder of the Quranic text. He was an ansar (helper), and later joined the ranks of the Muslim army at age 19. After Muhammad's passing in 632, he was ordered to collect the Quran into a single volume from various written and oral sources during the time of Caliph Abu Bakr. He was a noted expert on the Quran and spent much time reciting it.

== Biography ==
Zayd belonged to the Banu Najjar from Banu Khazraj. When he was almost six years old, his father, Thabit died in the Battle of Bu'ath. Zayd was 11 years old when he asked permission to participate in the Battle of Badr. Since he was younger than fifteen, Muhammad did not allow him to do so and sent him back. He then decided to try to win favour with Muhammad by learning the Quran. He was later appointed to write letters to non-Muslims and to collect and keep a record of the Qur'anic verses. Zayd was among those Muhammad chose to write down the verses of the Quran. He used to spend most of his time reciting the Quran and continued to learn the Quranic verses as Muhammad recited them. Zayd later volunteered to fight when he was 19 years old. This time, he was accepted in the ranks of the Muslim army. Zayd's time to fight had come nine years after establishing the Muslim community in Medina.

== Muhammad's era: 610-632 ==
Zayd had the role of writing down the Quranic verses that were sent to Muhammad from Allah through the Angel Jibra'il. Zayd had also been commanded by Muhammad to learn Hebrew and he took a fortnight to master each of the languages including Persian, Coptic and Greek which he used to work as an interpreter of Muhammad.

== Compilation of the Qur'an ==
After Muhammad's death, Zayd, who became a Quran expert, was assigned the role of authenticating and collecting the oral and textual Quranic revelation into a single bounded volume. This initiative was started on the Rashidun Caliph Abu Bakr's agenda, especially after the Ridda Wars (wars of apostasy), and the Battle of Yamamah in particular, in which a large number of Quran memorizers (around 360) perished. Umar convinced Abu Bakr that the Quran should be collected in one manuscript.

So during Abu Bakr's reign as caliph, Zayd was given the task of collecting the Quranic verses from all over Arabia and was the head of the committee (including Ubayy ibn Ka'b) which performed this task (the number of people in this committee in some sources are around 25 whereas in some they number to 75). Zayd finally accepted the task and, according to him, "started locating the Quranic material and collecting it from parchments, scapula, leafstalks of date palms and from the memories of men (who knew it by heart)". When Zayd had completed his task, he left the prepared suhuf (sheets) with Abu Bakr. The suhuf had received ijma (approval) by almost all of the companions of Muhammad including Umar and Ali. There was no objection on the authenticity of the suhuf. Later on, before Abu Bakr's death, Abu Bakr left the suhuf with Umar who in turn left it with his daughter Hafsa. Hafsa, Umm Salama, and Aisha were wives of Muhammad who memorized the Qur'an.

Zayd ibn Thabit thus became one of the foremost authorities on the Quran, he was appointed the judge of Medina. Umar ibn al-Khattab once addressed the Muslims and said: "O people, whoever wants to ask about the Quran, let him go to Zayd ibn Thabit."

During the time of Caliph Uthman, by which time Islam had spread far and wide, differences in reading the Quran in different dialects of Arabic language became obvious. A group of companions, headed by Hudhayfah ibn al-Yaman, who was then stationed in Iraq, came to Uthman and urged him to "save the Muslim ummah before they differ about the Quran".

Uthman obtained the manuscript of the Quran from Hafsah and again summoned the leading authority, Zayd ibn Thabit, and some other companions to make copies of it. Zayd was put in charge of the task. The style of Arabic dialect used was that of the Quraish tribe. Hence, this style was emphasized above all others.

Zayd and other companions including Ubayy ibn Ka'b prepared five copies. One of these was sent to every Muslim province with the order that all other Quranic materials, whether fragmentary or complete copies, be burnt. When standard copies were made and were widely available to the Muslim community everywhere, then all other material was burnt voluntarily by Muslim communities themselves, with only few exceptions. This was important to eliminate variations or differences in the dialect from the standard text of the Quran. The Caliph Uthman kept a copy for himself and returned the original manuscript to Hafsah.

== Death ==
Sources differ about his death year. However, the fact he died in Medina in 665 (45 AH) is taken as authentic. Said Ibn Al-Musayyib stated: "I attended the funeral of Zaid bin Thabit. After he had been buried, Ibn Abbas said, 'O you people! Whoever wishes to know how knowledge leaves us should know that it is like this that knowledge leaves. I swear by Allah that a great deal of knowledge has just left us today."

== See also ==
- Zayd (name)
- Thabit (name)
- Muadh bin Jabal
- List of Sahabah
