= Abu Shu'ayb al-Soussi =

Abu Shu'ayb Salih ibn Ziyad ibn Abdillah ibn Ibrahim ibn al-Jarood al-Rustubi al-Soussi al-Raqqi (Arabic: أبو شعيب صالح بن بن زياد بن عبدالله بن إسماعيل بن إبراهيم بن الجارود الرُّستبي السوسي الرَّقي, c. 789/790 – 874), better known as Abu Shu'ayb al-Soussi or simply al-Soussi, was a significant figure in the transmission of the qira'at, having transmitted the qira'ah of Abu 'Amr through Yahya al-Yazidi.

== Qira'at ==
Abu Shu;ayb al-Soussi was born in 173 AH (around 790 AD), and learned the Quran from Yahya al-Yazidi, who himself had learnt from the renowned scholar and Arab linguist Abu Amr.

He became known as the "Sheikh of Raqqa," and was its principal Qāriʾ during his time. His students in the Quran included his son Abu al-Ma'soom Muhammad and Al-Nasa'i.

=== Chain of transmission ===
The riwayah of Al-Soussi is transmitted by Abu Shu'ayb al-Soussi, on the authority of Yahya al-Yazidi, on the authority of Abu 'Amr ibn al-'Ala' al-Basri, from Mujahid ibn Jabr, from Abdullah ibn Abbas, from Ubayy ibn Ka'b, from the Prophet Muhammad.

== Hadith ==
Al-Soussi was also a narrator of the Hadith. Among those who narrated from him were Abu Hatim Muhammad ibn Idris al-Razi and Abu Bakr ibn Abi Asim.

== 'Aqeedah ==
Al-Soussi was an Athari. It was narrated that when his daughter's husband did not explicitly reject the createdness of the Quran, a well-known Mu'tazilite position, he terminated their marriage.

== Death ==
Al-Soussi died in Raqqa in the month of Muharram in 261 AH (late 874 AD).
