= Qunbul =

- Born: 808 CE / 195 AH
- Died: 904 CE / 291 AH
- Other names: Abu ‘Amr Muhammad Ibn ‘Abd ar-Rahman, al-Makhzumi

Abu ‘Amr Muhammad Ibn ‘Abd ar-Rahman, al-Makhzumi, better known as Qunbul (195-291 AH / 808-904 CE), was one of the primary transmitters of one of the Qira'at, or the canonical methods of reading the Qur'an. Of the seven primary readings of the Qur'an, Qunbul was a transmitter of the method of Ibn Kathir al-Makki. Like Al-Buzzi, who was the other canonical transmitter of Ibn Kathir's method, Qunbul was an indirect student and lived later than the namesake of the recitation method.

In addition to transmitting one of the seven primary methods of Qur'an recitation, Qunbul was also the teacher of the man who was responsible for delineating those seven canonical readings, Abu Bakr Ibn Mujāhid.

He died in the year 904 CE.
