= Khallad =

Abu ‘Isa Khallad Ibn Khalid al-Baghdadi, best known as Khallad (?-220AH), was a significant early figure in the Qira'at, or variant methods of reciting the Qur'an. Khallad and Khalaf al-Bazzar were the two primary transmitters of the Qur'an reading method of Hamzah az-Zaiyyat.

Although Khallad was one of the primary transmitters of Qur'an recitation, he rarely taught the skill, and when he did so, he only taught a small number of select individuals. He was known for being one of the more meticulous reciters.

He died in the year 835CE.
