= Al-Bazzi =

- Born: 786CE; 170AH
- Died: 864CE; 250AH
- Other name: Abu al-Hasan Ahmad Ibn Muhammad Ibn ‘Abdillah Ibn al-Qasim Ibn Nafi'i Ibn Abi Bazzah (أحمد بن محمد بن عبدالله بن القاسم بن نافع بن أبي بزَّة)

Abu al-Hasan Ahmad Ibn Muhammad Ibn ‘Abdillah Ibn al-Qasim Ibn Nafi'i Ibn Abi Bazzah (Arabic: أحمد بن محمد بن عبدالله بن القاسم بن نافع بن أبي بزَّة), better known simply as al-Bazzi (170–250AH) (786/7–864/5 CE), was an important figure in the transmission of Qira'at, the seven canonical methods of Qur'an reading. He and Qunbul were the primary people responsible for spreading the recitation method of Ibn Kathir al-Makki, which became especially popular among the people of Mecca.

Al-Bazzi's forefather, Abu Bazza, was of Persian descent and had reportedly converted to Islam through al-Sāʾib b. Abī al-Sāʾib Ṣayfī al-Makhzūmī (died after 638), one of the companions of the Islamic Prophet Muhammad. Al-Bazzi was a client (mawla) of the Banu Makhzum tribe.

Al-Bazzi was considered the chief Qāriʾ in his time and was also the Mu'adhin of Al-Masjid al-Haram. He died in 864CE.
