= Ubayy ibn Ka'b =

Companion of the Islamic prophet Muhammad

Ubayy ibn Ka'b أُبَيّ ٱبْن كَعْب
- Born: Medina, Hejaz, Arabia
- Died: c. 649 CE (30 AH); Medina, Rashidun Caliphate (present-day KSA)
- Occupations: Scribe, Hafiz, Mushawf Muhammad
- Family: Banu Khazraj (tribe)

Ubayy ibn Ka'b (Arabic: أُبَيّ ٱبْن كَعْب, ʾUbayy ibn Kaʿb) (died 649), also known as Abu Mundhir, was a companion of the Islamic prophet Muhammad and a person of high esteem in the early Muslim community. He was short, skinny, and gray haired.

He is notable for the Quran codex he compiled.

== Biography ==
Ubayy was born in Medina (then known as Yathrib), into the tribe of the Banu Khazraj. He was one of the first to accept Islam and pledge allegiance to Muhammad at al-Aqabah before the migration to Medina, becoming one of the Ansar. He joined the second pledge at al-Aqabah. Later, he participated in the battle of Badr and other following engagements.

He acted as a scribe for Muhammad, writing letters for him. Ubayy was one of the few who compiled the surahs of the Quran to write his own codex that had 116 surahs (compared to the 114 of the Uthmanic codex). He believed that the Throne Verse was the greatest verse in the Qu'ran when asked by the Prophet himself on an occasion.

Ubayy enjoyed a special honor with regard to the Quran. One day, the Prophet said: "O Ubayy ibn Ka'b! I have been commanded to show or lay open the Quran to you."

Ubayy was elated. He knew of course that the Prophet only received commands from on high. Unable to control his excitement, he asked:

"O Messenger of God...Have I been mentioned to you by name?" "Yes," replied the Prophet, "By your own name and by your genealogy (nasab) in the highest heavens."

Following Muhammad's death, he was one of the twenty-five Hafiz, people who knew the Qur'an completely by heart.

He was part of the consultative group (mushawarah) to which the caliph Abu Bakr referred many problems. It included Umar, Uthman, Ali, Abd-al-Rahman ibn Awf, Muadh ibn Jabal, and Zayd ibn Thabit.

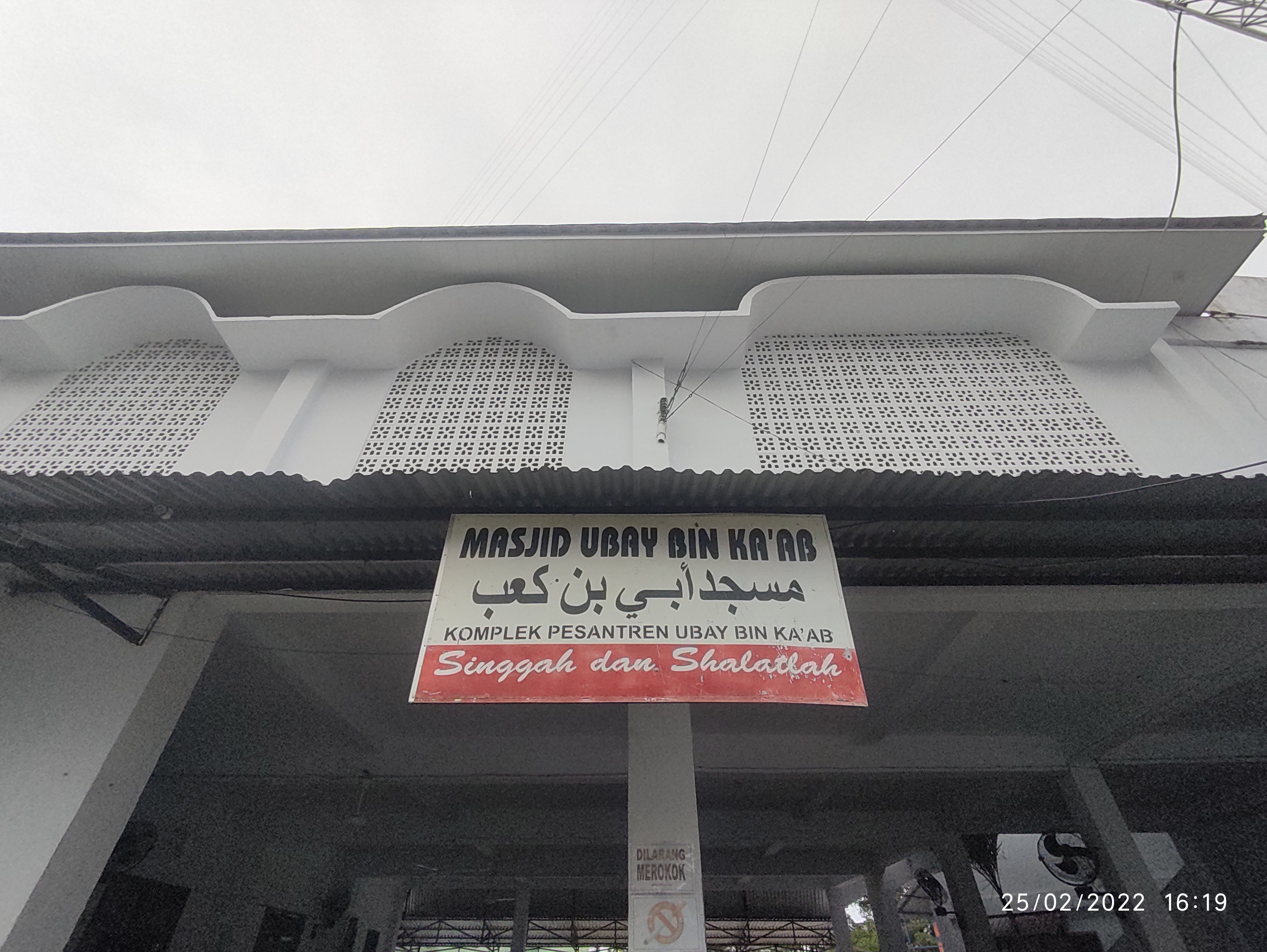
Mosque with name of Ubayy Ibn Kaab in Indonesia

Umar later consulted the same group when he was caliph. Specifically for fatwas (legal judgments) he referred to Ali ibn Abi Talib, Uthman, Ubayy, and Zayd ibn Thabit.

Because of Ubayy's high standing, one might have expected him to have been given positions of administrative responsibility, for example as a governor, in the rapidly expanding Muslim state. (During the time of the Prophet he had performed the function of a collector of charity) But, Umar didn't appoint him to any governing position, so one day Ubayy was fed up and asked: "What's the matter with you? Why don't you appoint me as a governor?" and Umar replied: "I do not want your religion to be corrupted."

== Death ==
Ubayy died in the year 649 AD (30 AH), during the caliphate of Uthman.

== See also ==
- Ubay (name)
- Ka'b (name)
