= Al-Duri =

Arab canonical reciter of the Qur'an (767–860)

Ad-Duri
- Born: 767CE; 150AH; Samarra
- Died: 860CE; 246AH; Baghdad
- Other name: Abu ‘Amr Hafs Ibn ‘Umar Ibn ‘Abd al-‘Aziz al-Baghdadi

Abu ‘Amr Hafs Ibn ‘Umar Ibn ‘Abd al-‘Aziz al-Baghdadi, better known as Al-Duri (767-860 CE; 150-246 AH), was a significant figure in the transmission of the Qira'at, or methods of reciting the Qur'an. Of the seven canonical reciters, al-Duri was a transmitter for two entirely separate methods: that of Abu 'Amr ibn al-'Ala' and that of Al-Kisa'i. He was a direct disciple of the latter and an indirect disciple of the former due to a generational gap. al-Duri transmits Abu 'Amr's recitation through Abu Muhammad Yahya ibn al-Mubarak ibn a-Mughirah al-Yazidi (d. 202 AH). Learned men were said to have travelled from different countries to learn both Qur'an recitation as well as Hadith from him. Among his students in recitation were Muhammad bin Dawud al-Zahiri and Niftawayh.

Al-Duri was born in Samarra in the year 767CE, died in Baghdad during the month of Shawwal in the year 860CE. Though he was born and grew up in Samarra, his roots were traced to his city of death and he was a member of the Arabian tribe of Azd. A simple and pious man, he lost his sight in his old age.
