= Hamzah az-Zaiyyat =

Canonical transmitter of the Qira'at (d. 772)

Abu ‘Imarah Hamzah Ibn Habib az-Zayyat At-Taymi
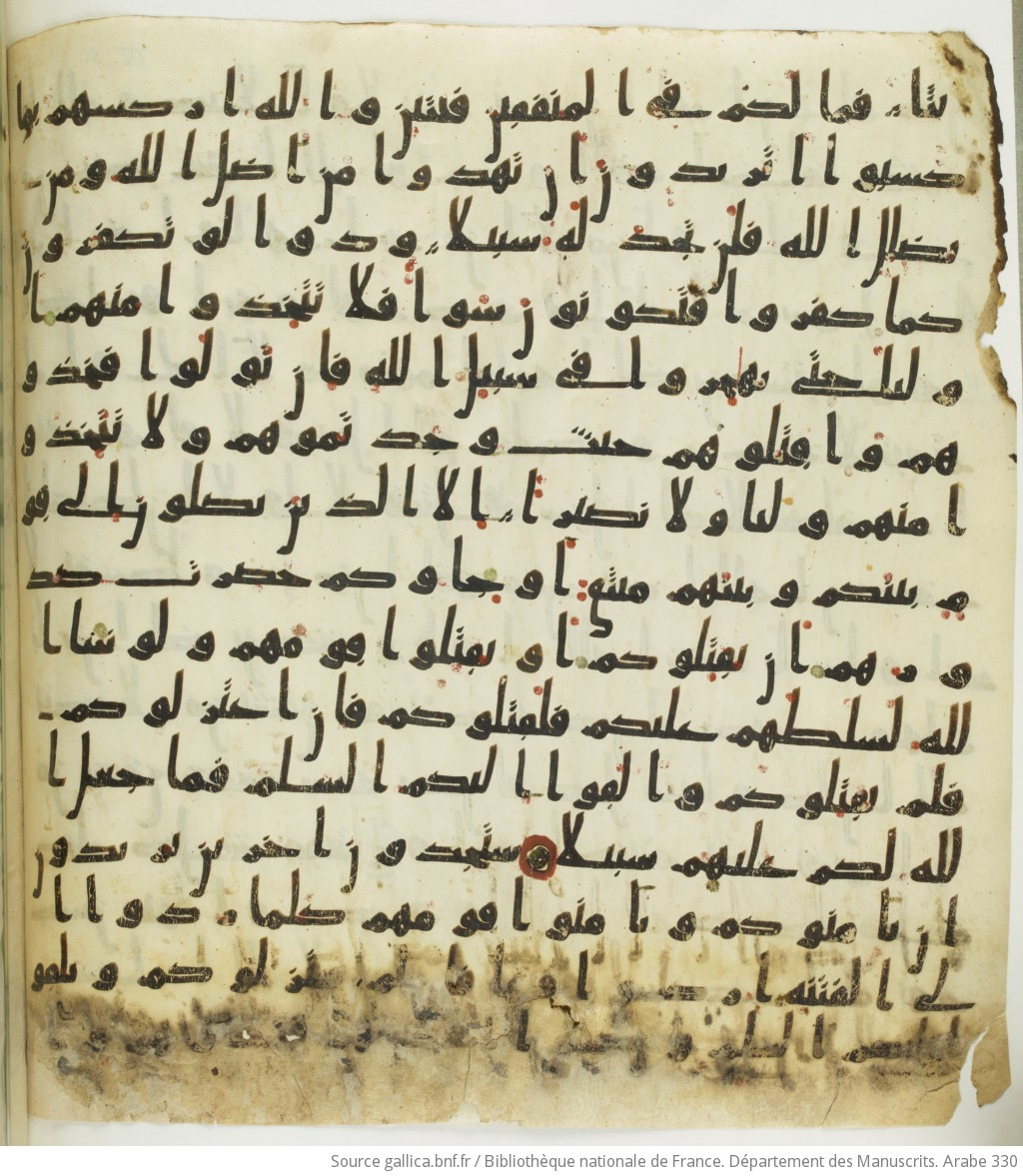
- An early Kufic Quranic folio from the 8th century. Distinct colored dots serve as vocalization guides to distinguish between the Qira'at of Warsh (green) and Hamza (red).

Personal life
- Born: AH 80 Kufa
- Died: AH 156; 772CE Hulwan
- Home town: Kufa
- Parent: Habib az-Zayyat at-Taymi (father)
- Known for: One of the seven canonical transmitters of the Qira'at

Religious life
- Religion: Islam

Muslim leader
- Students: Khalaf al-Bazzar, Khallad

Abu ‘Imarah Hamzah Ibn Habib al-Zayyat al-Taymi, better known as Hamzah az-Zaiyyat (80-156AH), was one of the seven canonical transmitters of the Qira'at, or methods of reciting the Qur'an. His appellation "az-Zaiyyat" was given to him because he used to work transporting natural oils to Hulwan and then bringing cheese and walnuts back to Kufa. He was a Persian.

His style of recitation was traditionally one of three preferred in the historic city of Kufa, his hometown. Az-Zaiyyat himself had been taught to recite the Qur'an by al-A'mash, and al-Kisa'i was one of his students. The two primary students who preserved and spread his method were Khalaf al-Bazzar and Khallad. Az-Zaiyyat was not without his critics: Ahmad ibn Hanbal intensely disliked some characteristics of his reading, and fellow reciter Shu'bah considered his method of reading to constitute bid'ah.

In addition to his Qur'anic reading, az-Zaiyyat was also known as an Arabic grammarian and linguist. However, his efforts in the latter two fields were largely unrecognized, and the people of Basra in particular disliked his way and alleged that he had grammatical errors.

He died in the year 772CE/156AH at the age of 76 in Hulwan.
