= Aasim ibn Abi al-Najud =

Primary transmitter of the Qira'at (died 745)

Aasim Ibn Abi an-Najud
- عاصم بن أبي النجود

Personal life
- Died: 745 CE; 127 AH
- Main interest: Quran
- Other name: Abu Bakr ‘Aasim Ibn Abi al-Najud al-'Asadi

Religious life
- Religion: Islam

Muslim leader
- Teacher: Abu 'Abd al-Rahman al-Sulami
- Students: Hafs

Abu Bakr ‘Aasim Ibn Abi al-Najud al-'Asadi (died 745 CE / 127 AH), commonly known as ‘Aasim ibn Abi al-Najud, was, according to Islamic tradition, one of the seven primary transmitters of the Qira'at, or variant readings of the Qur'an. Of Arab origin, his method of reciting the Qur'an as transmitted by Hafs is the most common and popular way of reciting the holy book in the Muslim world in general.

Though he lived much of his life in Kufa, he was associated with Banu Asad ibn Khuzaymah due to a pact. His fellow recitation transmitter Abu 'Amr ibn al-'Ala' also studied under him.

Despite being from Kufa, Aasim's reading was not popular there at first. Unlike most reciters in Kufa, he did not accept the pre-Uthmanic style of the Qur'an written by the companion of the Prophet, Abdullah ibn Masud; most of the people of Kufa continued reciting based on that style for a period even after the Uthmanic version became canon. Eventually this changed with the standardisation of the mushaf, and in time Aasim's reading became the norm for the Muslim world. In fact, of the seven primary methods of recitation, only two have become particularly common in the Muslim world: that of Nafi‘ al-Madani in much of Africa outside of Egypt and that of Aasim in the rest of the Muslim world in general.

He died in the year 745 CE, corresponding to the year 127 AH.

== Comparison of Warsh and Aasim's recitation ==
The Warsh 'an Naafi' recitation of the Quran differs from Hafs 'an Aasim' in orthography. The majority of differences do not affect the meaning. Yet in some cases the differences change the implications of the verse. In verse 2:184 Hafs recites the verse to be "... a ransom [as substitute] of feeding a poor person...". On the other hand, Warsh reads it "... a ransom [as substitute] of feeding poor people..." Other variants orthography include :

رواية ورش عن نافع	رواية حفص عن عاصم	Ḥafs	Warsh	Chapter and Verse
يَعْمَلُونَ	تَعْمَلُونَ	you do	they do	Al-Baqara 2:85
وًأَوْصّى	وَوَصَّى	enjoined	instructed	Al-Baqara 2:132
سَارِعُوا	وَسَارِعُوا	And hasten to	Hasten to	Al 'imran 3:133
مَا تَنَزَّلُ	مَا نُنَزِّلُ	we do not send down...	they do not come down...	Al-Ḥijr 15:8
قُل	قَالَ	he said	say!	Al-Anbiyā' 21:4
كَثِيرًا	كَبِيرًا	mighty	multitudinous	Al-Aḥzāb 33:68
بِمَا	فَبِمَا	then it is what	it is what	Al-Shura 42:30
نُدْخِلْهُ	يُدْخِلْهُ	he makes him enter	we make him enter	Al-Fatḥ 48:17

Another major difference between Hafs and Warsh recitation of the Quran is the pronunciation of the words. Modern Qurans have diacritical marks (known as Tashkil) and in some cases pronouncing the word differently could imply different meaning. Here are some examples:

رواية ورش عن نافع	رواية حفص عن عاصم	Ḥafs	Warsh	Chapter and Verse
مَلِكِ	مَالِكِ	Owner	King	Al-Fatihah Q1:4 (Q1:3 in Warsh)
يٌكَذّبُونَ	يَكْذِبُونَ	they lie	they were lied to (or) they deny	Al-Baqara Q2:10 (Q2:9 in Warsh)
قُتِلَ	قَاتَلَ	And many a prophet fought	And many a prophet was killed	Al 'imran Q3:146
سَاحِرَانِ	سِحْرَانِ	two works of magic	two magicians	Al-Qasas Q28:48
