= Ibn Amir ad-Dimashqi =

Ibn ‘Amir Ad-Dimashqi
- Born: Balqa'a
- Died: 736CE; 118AH
- Other name: ‘Abdullah Ibn ‘Amir Ibn Yazid Ibn Tamim Ibn Rabi‘ah al-Yahsibi

‘Abdullah Ibn ‘Amir Ibn Yazid Ibn Tamim Ibn Rabi‘ah al-Yahsibi, better known as Ibn Amir (died 118 AH / 736 CE), was one of the seven canonical transmitters of the Qira'at, or methods of reciting the Qur'an.

Of the seven most famous transmitters of Qur'anic recitation, Ibn Amir was the oldest while Al-Kisa'i was the youngest. Like Ibn Kathir al-Makki, Ibn Amir was one generation removed from the primary students who spread his method of recitation to the masses. The two primary students of his method of recitation were Hisham ibn Ammar (d. 245AH/859CE) and Ibn Dhakwan (d. 242AH/857CE).

He was from Balqa'a in Jordan. He died in the year 736CE, corresponding to the year 118AH.
