= Khalaf al-Bazzar =

Personal life
- Born: 150 AH / 767 CE
- Died: 7 Jumada al-Akhirah 229 AH / 2nd March 844 CE (aged 79)
- Home town: Baghdad

Religious life
- Religion: Islam

Muslim leader
- Teacher: Hamzah az-Zaiyyat

Abu Muhammad Khalaf ibn Hisham ibn Tha'lab al-Asadi al-Bazzar al-Baghdadi (Arabic: أبو محمد خلف بن هشام بن ثعلب الأسدي البزاز البغدادي, 150–229 AH/767–844 CE), better known as Khalaf, was an important figure in the history of the Qur'an and the Qira'at, or method of recitation. In addition to being a transmitter for the Quran reading method of Hamzah az-Zaiyyat, one of the seven canonical readers, he was also known for his own independent method that is counted among the three accepted but less famous methods.

For Khalaf's own, independent method of recitation, the two primary transmitters from him were Ishaq al-Maruzi and Idris al-Haddad.

He died in 7 Jumada al-Thani 229 AH/2nd March 844CE.
