= Al-Soussi recitation =

The Al-Soussi recitation or Al-Soussi 'an Abi 'Amr (Arabic: رواية السوسي عن أبي عمرو, lit. 'Transmission of al-Soussi from Abi 'Amr') is a riwayah of the Quran, transmitted by al-Soussi from the Qiraʼat of Abu 'Amr ibn al-'Ala' al-Basri. It is most commonly used today in Somalia.

== Qira'at and riwayat ==
The Qiraʼat are different linguistic, lexical, phonetic, morphological and syntactical forms permitted with reciting the Quran. Differences between Qira'at are slight and include varying rules regarding the prolongation, intonation, and pronunciation of words, but also differences in stops, vowels, consonants, leading to different pronouns and verb forms, and less frequently, entire words.

Each of the ten Qira'at has two riwayat (sing: riwayah), which, although different from each other, are both considered acceptable ways to read the Quran.

The riwayah of the Quran that is in "general use" throughout most of the Muslim world today is that of Ḥafṣ on the authority of `Asim (Ḥafṣ being the Rawi, or "transmitter", and `Asim being the Qari or "reader"). However, the riwayah of Al-Douri 'an Abi 'Amr is dominant in Sudan and Somalia, and the riwayah of Warsh 'an Nafi' dominant in North (except Libya, where Qalun 'an Nafi' is dominant, Egypt, where the aforementioned Hafs is dominant, and Sudan, as described above) and West Africa.

== Chain of transmission ==
The riwayah is transmitted by Abu Shu'ayb al-Soussi, on the authority of Yahya al-Yazidi, on the authority of Abu 'Amr ibn al-'Ala' al-Basri, from Mujahid ibn Jabr, from Abdullah ibn Abbas, from Ubayy ibn Ka'b, from the Prophet Muhammad.

=== Abu 'Amr ibn al-'Ala' al-Basri ===
Abu 'Amr ibn al-'Ala' al-Basri was a Qāriʾ from a branch of the Banu Tamim, He studied under Ibn Abi Ishaq, and was a renowned scholar of Arabic grammar in addition to his knowledge of the Quran, founding the Basran school of grammar. Among his own pupils were Al-Khalil ibn Ahmad al-Farahidi, Yunus ibn Habib and Harun ibn Musa. Although he never met Sibawayhi, the ethnic Persian considered the father of Arabic grammar, Sibawayhi quotes from Abu 'Amr 57 times in his well-known Kitab, mostly by transmission from Ibn Habib and al-Farahidi.

In addition to Al-Soussi, Ibn al-'Ala's Qira'ah was also transmitted by Al-Duri.

=== Abu Shu'ayb al-Soussi ===
Abu Shu'ayb al-Soussi was a Qari' who learnt the Quran in the Qira'ah of Abu 'Amr through Yahya al-Yazidi.

== Characteristics ==
The riwayah is characterised by its higher use of idgham kabir. Other characteristics are its use of taqlil and imalah, although they are in comparable use to other recitations.
