= Al-Jarmi =

Arabic grammarian of Abbasid era (died 840)

Abū ‘Umar Ṣāliḥ ibn Isḥāq al-Bajīli al-Jarmī
- Born: Basra
- Died: c. 840 (225 AH)
- Other names: al-Jarmī
- Occupation: Grammarian of Basra
- Era: Islamic Golden Age (Abbasid era)

Al-Jarmī, full name Abū ‘Umar Ṣāliḥ ibn Isḥāq al-Bajīli al-Jarmī (أبو عمر صالح ابن اسحاق الجرمي) (d.840 AD/ 225 AH), (Note: The date is omitted in “Al-Fihrist”.) was an influential grammarian of the Basra school during the Islamic Golden Age, who took part in learned discussions at Baghdād.

He was a jurisconsult, philologist and native of Basra who studied in Baghdād under al-Akhfash al-Awsat. He studied philology under Abū Ubayda, Abū Zaid al-Ansāri, al-Aṣmā’ī et al., and became a teacher of akhbar (traditions). Abū ‘l-Abbās al-Mubarrad quotes al-Jarmī having told him that he had studied the “Diwan of the Hudhaylites” under al-Aṣmā’ī, whose expertise in that work had surpassed his own, and al-Aṣmā’ī saying to him “O Abū Omar [al-Jarmī] if a member of the Banu Hudhayl happen to be neither poet nor archer, nor runner, then he’s nothing!” Referring to a passage from The Qur'ān, he said, “Follow not what you know, say not you have heard when you have not, or seen when you did not see, or know when you do not know; for the hearing, the sight and the heart are subjects on which you will answer to God!”. Al-Mubarrad regarded al-Jarmī the expert on Sībawayh's Kitāb, as he had memorised much of it and taught the great majority of those who studied it. He also wrote original philological works and was a highly esteemed historian of tradition and muhaddith (hadīth scholar). The hafiz Abū Noaim also mentions al-Jarmī. Shaykh Abū Sa‘īd said that al-Jarmī and al-Māzinī were the leading grammarians of their generation, and were followed by the generation of al-Mubarrad.

The primary account of his life is found in Al-Nadim’s “Fihrist”, where the isnad (Note: isnad; chain of transmission system found in traditional Islamic narrative, requisite to authentication of a text.) begins with the written account of al-Khazzāz, that al-Mubarrad had said al-Jarmī was a protégé of Bajīlah ibn Anmār ibn Irāsh ibn al-Ghawth, brother to al-Azd ibn al-Ghawth." Abū Sa‘īd (Note: Abū Sa‘īd Ibn Bahrīz ‘Abd Yasū was abbit of the convent of Elias or Sa‘īd at Mosul who collected canons and decisions.) said that al-Jarmī was a protégé of Jarm ibn Rabbān. Al-Jarmī was said to have derived his name from the Jarm, an Arab tribe of Yemen, with whom he had lived for a time. He studied grammar and the “Kitāb” (Book) of Sībawayh with al-Akhfash and others, and linguistics under Abū Zayd and al-Aṣma‘ī. Al-Jarmī never met Sībawayh but did meet Yūnus ibn Ḥabīb.

== Pupils ==
- Al-Tawwazī studied The Book of Sībawayh with Abū ‘Umar al-Jarmī
- Ibn Durustūyah (Note: scholar at Basra, originally from Fars. Beatty MS gives Darasutūyah, Khallikan, II, 24, says it is pronounced Durustūya; Ibn Makūla in his Kitab al-Aamal says it is Darastawaih; & Zubaydī gives Darastawayh) a student associate of al-Mubarrad and Tha‘lab and a distinguished adherent of al-Baṣrah school, who wrote a commentary on al-Jarmī.
- Abū al-Ḥasan ‘Alī ibn ‘lsā al-Rummānī the Grammarian, (b.296/908-909) the most illustrious grammarian of al-Baṣrah and theologian of Baghdād. He was a jurist, and prolific author, who wrote a commentary on al-Jarmī's Abridgment; (Note: The full title of this book by al-Jarmī is Abridgment of the Grammar of the Learned.)
- Abū al-Ḥasan Ibn al-Warrāq (Note: Flügel text gives a different name and different titles. The translation follows the Beatty MS.) whose name was Muḥammad ibn ‘Abd Allāh. He also wrote a commentary on al-Jarmī's “Abridgment of Grammar”.

== Works ==
- Al-Farkh (الفرخ) ‘Differentiation, or Al-Faraḥ (الفرح) ‘Joy’, or Al-Faraj (الفرج)
- Tafasīr gharīb Sībawayh (تفسير غريب سيبويه) ‘Commentary on the Strange in Sībawayh’; Explanation on the Difficulties in verses quoted by Sībawayh in the Kitāb.
- Al-‘Arūdh (العروض) ‘Prosody’
- Mukhtaṣar nawh al-muta’allamīn (مختصر نحو المتعلّمين) ‘Abridgment of the Grammar of the Learned’
- Al-Qawāfī (القوافى) ‘Rhyming’ (Note: These last three titles are omitted in the Beatty MS.)
- Al-Tathaniat wa-al-Juma (التثنية والجمع) ‘The Dual and the Plural’
- Al-abnīyah wa-al-taṣrīf (الابنية والتصريف) ‘Structures and Inflection’; Treatise on the Forms of Verbs and Nouns. Perhaps after a book of this name by Sībawayh.
- Kitāb fī ‘s-Siar (on the life of Muḥammad) (Note: Omitted in al-Fihrist.)

== Sources ==
- Kaḥḥālah, ‘Umar Riḍā (1959). A'lām al-Nisā'. Vol. 3. Damascus: Al-Hāshimī Press.
- Khallikān (Ibn), Aḥmad ibn Muḥammad (1843). Ibn Khallikan's Biographical Dictionary (translation of Wafayāt al-A'yān wa-Anbā' Abnā' al-Zamān). Vol. 1. Translated by McGuckin de Slane, William. London: W. H. Allen. pp. 629–631.
- Khallikān (Ibn), Aḥmad ibn Muḥammad (1868). Ibn Khallikan's Biographical Dictionary (translation of Wafayāt al-A'yān wa-Anbā' Abnā' al-Zamān). Vol. III. Translated by McGuckin de Slane, William. London: W. H. Allen. p. 31.
- al-Mas’ūdī, Abū al-Hasan (1869) [1861]. Kitāb Murūj al-Dhahab wa-Ma'ādin al-Jawhar (Les Prairies d'or). Vol. 9. Translated by de Meynard, C. Barbier; de Courteille, Pavet. Paris: Imprimerie impériale.
- Nadīm (al-), Ibn Isḥāq (1970). Dodge, Bayard (ed.). The Fihrist of al-Nadīm A Tenth-Century Survey of Muslim Culture. Vol. 1. Translated by Dodge, Bayard. New York & London: Columbia University Press.
- Nadīm (al-), Abū al-Faraj Muḥammad ibn Isḥāq (1872). Flügel, Gustav (ed.). Kitāb al-Fihrist (in Arabic). Leipzig: F.C.W. Vogel. pp. 665–6 (54–55).
- Wright, William (1894). A Short History of Syriac Literature. London: Black. p. 234.
- Yāqūt, Shihāb al-Dīn ibn ‘Abd al-Ḥamawī (1993). "566". In Abbās, Ihsan (ed.). Irshād al-Arīb alā Ma'rifat al-Adīb (in Arabic). Beirut: Dār Gharib al-Islām i. pp. 1442-4.
- Zubaydī (al-), Muḥammad ibn al-Ḥasan (1954). Ibrāhīm, Muḥammad (ed.). Ṭabaqāt al-Naḥwīyīn wa-al-Lughawīyīn. Cairo: Al-Khanjī. pp. 74–75.
