= Al-Douri 'an Abi 'Amr recitation =

Recitation of the Quran

The Al-Douri 'an Abi 'Amr recitation (Arabic: رواية الدوري عن أبي عمرو, lit. 'Transmission of al-Douri from Abi 'Amr') is a riwayah of the Quran, transmitted by al-Douri from the Qiraʼat of Abu 'Amr ibn al-'Ala' al-Basri.

== Qira'at and riwayat ==
The Qiraʼat are different linguistic, lexical, phonetic, morphological and syntactical forms permitted with reciting the Quran. Differences between Qira'at are slight and include varying rules regarding the prolongation, intonation, and pronunciation of words, but also differences in stops, vowels, consonants, leading to different pronouns and verb forms, and less frequently, entire words.

Each of the ten Qira'at has two riwayat (sing: riwayah), which, although different from each other, are both considered acceptable ways to read the Quran.

The riwayah of the Quran that is in "general use" throughout most of the Muslim world today is that of Ḥafṣ on the authority of `Asim (Ḥafṣ being the Rawi, or "transmitter", and `Asim being the Qari or "reader"). However, the riwayah of Al-Douri 'an Abi 'Amr (the subject of this article) is dominant in Sudan and East Africa, and the riwayah of Warsh 'an Nafi' dominant in North (except Libya, where Qalun 'an Nafi' is dominant, Egypt, where the aforementioned Hafs is dominant, and Sudan, as described above) and West Africa.

== Chain of transmission ==
The riwayah is transmitted by Hafs al-Douri, on the authority of Yahya al-Yazidi, on the authority of Abu 'Amr ibn al-'Ala' al-Basri, from Mujahid ibn Jabr, from Abdullah ibn Abbas, from Ubayy ibn Ka'b, from Muhammad.

=== Abu 'Amr ibn al-'Ala' al-Basri ===
Abu 'Amr ibn al-'Ala' al-Basri was a Qāriʾ from a branch of the Banu Tamim, He studied under Ibn Abi Ishaq, and was a renowned scholar of Arabic grammar in addition to his knowledge of the Quran, founding the Basran school of grammar. Among his own pupils were Al-Khalil ibn Ahmad al-Farahidi, Yunus ibn Habib and Harun ibn Musa. Although he never met Sibawayhi, the ethnic Persian considered the father of Arabic grammar, Sibawayhi quotes from Abu 'Amr 57 times in his well-known Kitab, mostly by transmission from Ibn Habib and al-Farahidi.

In addition to Al-Soussi, Ibn al-'Ala's Qira'ah was also transmitted by Al-Duri.

=== Hafs al-Douri ===
Hafs al-Douri was a Qari' who learnt the Quran in the Qira'ah of Abu 'Amr through Yahya al-Yazidi. A member of the Azd tribe, he was born in Samarra, and died in Baghdad. A simple and pious man, he lost his sight in his old age.

== Characteristics ==
The riwayah employs taqlil and imalah, differentiating it from the well-known Hafs recitation although this a fairly common characteristic between most recitations.

== History and current spread ==
Historically, the riwayah was the most popular in the mashriq, i.e. the eastern Islamic world. However, largely due to Ottoman influence, the Hafs recitation spread in these regions and the al-Douri recitation is now confined to Somalia, east Africa and some parts of Sudan.
