= Mahmoud Khalil Al-Hussary =

Egyptian Quran reciters and scholar (1917–1980)

Shaykh al-Maqari Mahmoud Khalil al-Husary
- محمود خليل الحصري
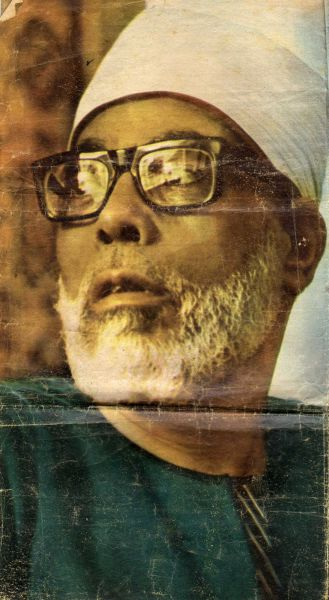
- Born: 17 September 1917; Shubra al-Namla, Tanta, Gharbia Governorate, Sultanate of Egypt (present-day Egypt)
- Died: 24 November 1980 (aged 63)
- Resting place: Southern City of the Dead, El-Basatīn, Old Cairo
- Education: Al Azhar University, Cairo
- Occupations: Quran reciter and scholar
- Known for: Recording the first murattal recitation of entire Qur'an; Contribution to Quran recitation and its rulings
- Notable work: Al-Muṣḥaf al-Muʿallim; Aḥkām Qirāʾat al-Qurʾān al-Karīm
- Honours: Order of Sciences and Arts – First Class (1967)

Religious life
- Religion: Islam
- Denomination: Sunni

Mahmoud Khalil Al-Husary (Note: Arabic: محمود خليل الحصري) (17 September 1917 – 24 November 1980), also known as Al-Husary, was an Egyptian Quran reciter and scholar of Quranic readings (qira'at). He was particularly known for his measured recitation style (murattal) and was the first reciter to record the complete Quran in this style. He was also known for his expertise in the ten canonical readings of the Quran and his contributions to the study and teaching of tajwid (rules of Quranic recitation).

Al-Husary memorised the Quran in childhood and began reciting at public gatherings by the age of 12. In 1944, he won Egypt Radio's Quran Recitation competition, which attracted approximately 200 participants. He later held several religious and administrative positions, including Shaykh Umūm al-Maqāri (chief Qari), overseeing Egypt's Quran recitation circles.

He recorded the complete Quran in several canonical readings and authored works on Quranic recitation and its rules. His recordings became widely used in Quran memorisation and instruction. Alongside Al-Minshawy, Abdul Basit, and Mustafa Ismail, Al-Husary is regarded as one of the four prominent Egyptian reciters of modern era, whose recitations had a significant influence across the Islamic world.

== Early life and education ==
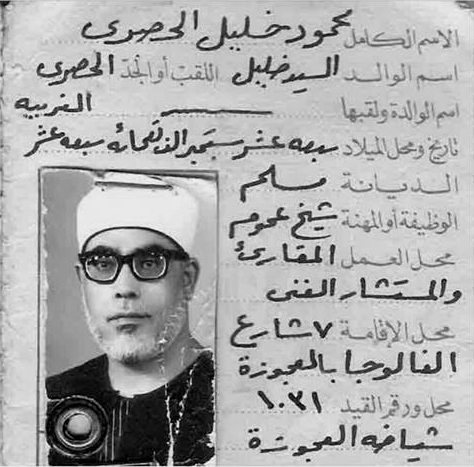
Al-Husary's identity card

Al-Husary was born on 17 September 1917 in Shubra al-Namla, a village near Tanta in Egypt's Gharbia Governorate. His family had originally come from the Faiyum Governorate. He enrolled in a traditional Quran school (kuttab) at the age of four and completed memorisation of the Quran by the age of nine.

He subsequently enrolled for further studies at the Ahmad al-Badawi Mosque in Tanta under the recitation scholar Ibrahim Sallam. He later continued his studies at Al-Azhar University in Cairo, specialising in the Ten canonical Quranic readings. He obtained a qualification in the discipline in 1958.

== Career ==
=== Radio and mosque appointments ===
In 1944, Al-Husary participated in the Egyptian Radio's competition for Quran reciters and ranked first among approximately 200 candidates, including established reciters Muhammad Rifat, Ali Mahmud, and Abd el-Fattah el-Sha'sha'i. He began broadcasting on Egyptian Radio that year, with his first live recitation reportedly taking place on 16 February 1944.

In 1945, Al-Husary was appointed a reciter at the Ahmad al-Badawi mosque in Tanta. In 1948, he was appointed a muezzin (caller to prayer) at the Sidi Hamza Mosque and subsequently served there as a Quran reciter. He also supervised recitation centres in the Gharbia governorate.

In 1955, he was appointed a reciter at Al-Hussein Mosque in Cairo, succeeding Muhammad el-Sayfi. He continued this position until his death.

In 1957, he was appointed an inspector of Egyptian Quran recitation centres. In 1958 he became deputy head of the Mashyakhat 'Umūm al-Maqari al-Misriyya (General Administration of Egyptian Quran Recitation Circles) and subsequently its head in 1961 as Shaykh Umūm al-Maqāri (Grand Shaykh of the Quranic Recitation Circles), the chief Qari of Egypt, a position involved in overseeing Quranic recitation centres throughout the country.

In 1964, Egypt's Holy Quran Radio was inaugurated, with Al-Husary becoming the first reciter to broadcast on the station on 25 March 1964.

=== Work at Al-Azhar ===
In 1959, Al-Husary was appointed a reviewer and proofreader of Quranic manuscripts by Al-Azhar. In 1962, he became deputy head of Al-Azhar's Committee for the Revision and Correction of Quranic Manuscripts and Copies, subsequently serving as its head.

In 1967, he was appointed an expert on Quranic affairs at Al-Azhar al-Sharif's Islamic Research Academy. He also served as a technical adviser on Quranic affairs at the Egyptian Ministry of Endowments.

== Recordings and works ==
Al-Husary recorded the complete Quran in both murattal (measured) and mujawwad (melodic) styles. He was the first reciter to record the complete Quran in the murattal style.

He recorded recitation in several canonical readings narrations. In 1961, he recorded the complete Quran according to the narration of Hafs from 'Asim. The recording began broadcasting on Egyptian Radio on 18 September 1961 and was subsequently broadcast for several years by a dedicated Quran radio station. He later recorded the Quran according to the narration of Warsh from Nafi' in 1964, followed by the narrations of Qalun from Nafi' and al-Duri' from Abi 'Amr in 1968.

In 1969, he recorded Al-Muṣḥaf al-Muʿallim (lit. 'The Teaching Mus'haf'), an instructional recording intended to assist learners in Quran recitation. He also produced Al-Muṣḥaf al-Mufassar (The Explanatory Mus'haf), an interpretive recitation of the Quran, in 1975.

Al-Husary authored numerous works on Quranic sciences, particularly Quranic readings and tajwid. His publications include:

- Ahkām Qirā'at al-Qur'ān al-Karīm (Rules of Recitation of the Noble Quran, 1970)
- al-Qirā'at al-'Ashr min al-Shātibiyyah wa-al-Durrah (The Ten Readings from al-Shatibiyyah and al-Surrah)
- Ma'ālim al-Ihtidā' ilā Ma'rifat al-Wuqūf wa-al-Ibtidā' (Guidelines for Understanding Stops and Starts)
- al-Nahj al-Jadīd fī 'Ilm al-Tajwīd (The New Approach to the Science of Tajwid)
- Ahsan al-Athar fi Tarikh al-Qurra' al-Arba'ata 'Ashar (The Finest Legacy in the History of the Fourteen Reciters)
- Maʿa al-Qurʾān al-Karīm (With the Noble Quran, 1976)
- Raḥalātī fī al-Islām (My Travels in Islam, 1977)
- Al-Sabīl al-Muyassar fī Qirāʾat al-Imām Abī Jaʿfar (The Facilitated Path to the Recitation of Imam Abū Ja'far)
- Nūr al-Qulūb fī Qirāʾat al-Imām Yaʿqūb (The Light of Hearts Regarding the Recitation of Imam Ya'qub)

== Recognition and awards ==
In 1967, he received the Egyptian Order of Sciences and Arts, First Class, from President Gamal Abdel Nasser. That year, he was also elected president of the Islamic World League of Quran Reciters, a position he held until his death.

In February 2026, Al-Husary was posthumously named the Global Quranic Personality of the 28th edition of the Dubai International Holy Quran Award. The award recognised his contributions to Quranic recitation, tajwid and the development of contemporary Quranic recitation methods.

== International visits ==
Al-Husary's international travels included his visits to Pakistan and India in 1960, where he recited the Quran at a conference attended by Indian Prime Minister, Jawaharlal Nehru and Egyptian President, Gamal Abdel Nasser.

He also visited several countries in Asia, Africa, Europe and the Middle East. Many of his visits took place during Ramadan, when he was invited to recite at mosques and Islamic centres. He also accompanied the rector of Al-Azhar on some international visits.

He participated in the World of Islam Festival in London in 1976. In 1977, he visited United States with Abd al-Halim Mahmud and recited the Quran at the United States Congress, the United Nations and in the White House, where he met President Jimmy Carter. In 1978, he visited the United Kingdom, where he recited at the Royal Hall in London and at gatherings attended by Muslim communities in Liverpool and Sheffield.

During a visit to Malaysia, Al-Husary was stranded in Kelantan for four days after severe flooding disrupted transport and communications. He was eventually evacuated by helicopter, reportedly sent by Malaysia's deputy prime minister, and flown to Kuala Lumpur aboard a military aircraft. His visit was part of a programme organised by the Malaysian government and the Egyptian embassy, following his role as chairman of the judging panel for Malaysia's annual Quran recitation competition.

== Recitation style ==
Al-Husary advocated adherence to traditional Quran recitation techniques and emphasised tarteel, which prioritises clarity, measured pacing and accurate pronunciation. He expressed reservations about recitation styles that placed excessive emphasis on melody at the expense of the text's pronunciation and meaning. He once said:

The tarteel shapes every word with an evocative manner, a fact that cannot be produced during a pure "chanted" interpretation where words are subjected to a certain musicality which can be opposing to the necessary sound print to reach the real meaning. And if we feel the melodic saturation during the “chanted” interpretation, we feel, on the other hand, calmness and introversion during tarteel derived from the message of the holy Quran.

In another instance, he said:

The tarteel puts us directly on the screen of the Quranic text. It puts us in an active listening position and makes the listener feel the responsibility to listen. However, "chanted" restitution borrows passages of introversion by an envelope of jollity; the tarteel is more difficult because it reveals faithfully the meaning. The roots of tarteel deal basically with the Quranic text and not the musical rhythms.

In the preface of one of his books, Ma' al-Qurān al-Karīm (With the Holy Quran), Mahmud Shaltut, then Grand Imam of al-Azhar, praised Al-Husary's adherence to established recitation methods and his attention to pronunciation and religious meaning.

== Death ==
Al-Husary died on 24 November 1980, aged 63. (Note: Sources differ regarding the place of Al-Husary's death. Some report that he died while visiting Kuwait, while others state he died in his home village in Egypt.) He was buried in his family burial in El-Basatin of Old Cairo's Southern part of the historic City of the Dead cemetery.

His final public recitations were reportedly held at the Masjid al-Haram in Mecca and Prophet's Mosque in Medina.

== Legacy ==
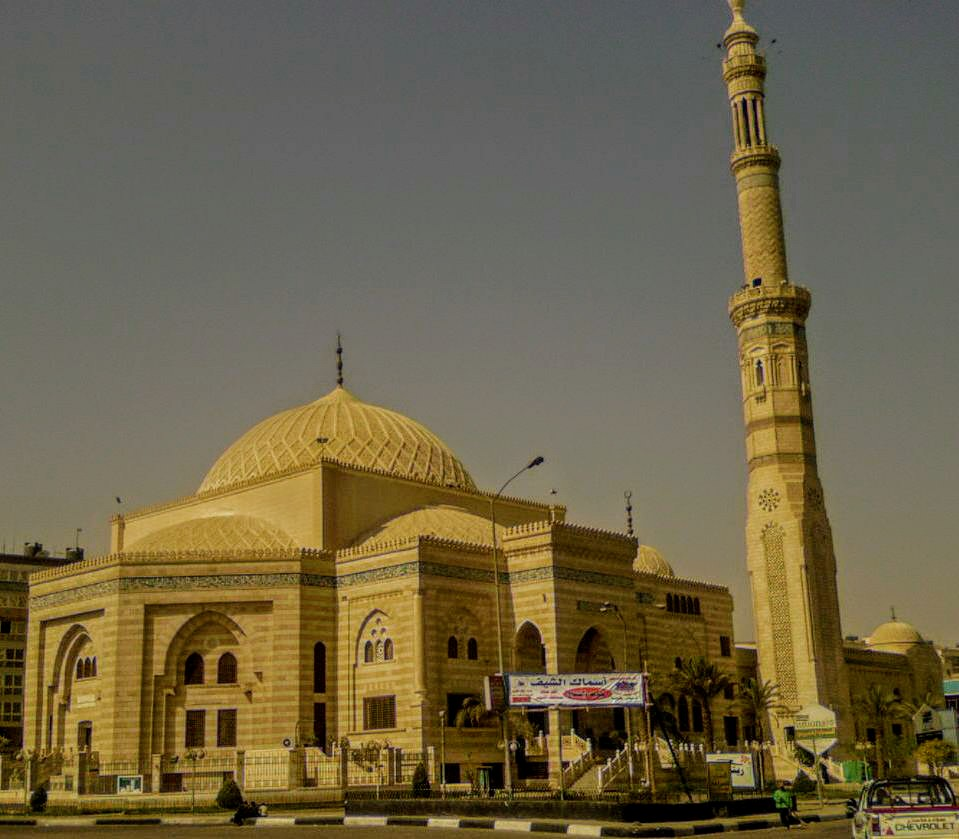
Al-Husary Mosque of Cairo inaugurated in 2005

Al-Husary's recordings remain widely used for Quran memorisation and recitation instruction across the Muslim World.

A television series about Al-Husary's life, titled Imām al-Muqri'īn (Arabic: إِمَام الْمُقْرِئِين, lit. 'The Leader of Quran Reciters'), was produced. It starred Hassan Youssef, directed by Mustafa el-Shall, and produced by Bahaa el-Din Ibrahim. Al-Husary's children, Mohamed and Yassmin al-Husary, supported the production.

In his will, Al-Husary allocated one-third of his estate towards the construction of a mosque in Agouza in Cairo. He also allocated provisions for the maintenance of a mosque he had built in Tanta, three Islamic institutes and a Quran memorization centre Ma'had al-Azhar, (Note: Arabic: معهد الأزهر, romanized: the luminous institute) in his home village, Shubra al-Namla.

His family established the Sheikh Al-Husari Association, (Note: Arabic: جمعية الشيخ الحصري, romanized: Jam'iyyat ash-Shaykh al-Ḥuṣarī) chaired by his daughter Yassmin al-Husary. The Society constructed the Al-Hosary Mosque in 6th of October City, which was inaugurated in October 2005. The complex includes an orphanage, a Quran institute, and multipurpose auditoriums. Amr Khaled, reportedly gives Thursday lectures in the mosque, as well as orthodox clergy of Al-Azhar, and government ministers. The Society has also been involved in charitable activities including assistance to Syrian refugees in Egypt.

The 26th International Quran Contest hosted by Egypt in 2019, was named after Al-Husary.

Al-Husary's influence has also been recognised outside the Arab World. Mohammed Burhanuddin, the 52nd Da'i al-Mutlaq of Dawoodi Bohra community, conferred the title Ḥuṣarī l-Hind (Husary of India) on his grandson, Husain Burhanuddin.

== See also ==
- Muhammad Rashad al-Sharif

== Sources ==
- İpşirli, Mehmet (1998). "HÛSARÎ, Mahmûd Halîl". TDV İslâm Ansiklopedisi (in Turkish). Vol. 18. Istanbul: Türkiye Diyanet Vakfı İslam Araştırmaları Merkezi. pp. 412–413.
