= Grammarians of Basra =

Arabic Grammarians of Basra city under Caliphate period

The first Grammarians of Baṣra lived during the seventh century in Al-Baṣrah. The town, which developed out of a military encampment, with buildings being constructed circa 638 AD, became the intellectual hub for grammarians, linguists, poets, philologists, genealogists, traditionists, zoologists, meteorologists, and above all exegetes of Qur’ānic tafsir and Ḥadīth, from across the Islamic world. These scholars of the Islamic Golden Age were pioneers of literary style and the sciences of Arabic grammar in the broadest sense. Their teachings and writings became the canon of the Arabic language. Shortly after the Basran school's foundation, a rival school was established at al-Kūfah circa 670, by philologists known as the Grammarians of Kūfah. Intense competition arose between the two schools, and public disputations and adjudications between scholars were often held at the behest of the caliphal courts. Later many scholars moved to the court at Baghdad, where a third school developed which blended many ideological and theological characteristics of the two. Many language scholars carried great influence and political power as court companions, tutors, etc., to the caliphs, and many were retained on substantial pensions.

Ishāq al-Nadīm—the 10th century author of Kitab al-Fihrist—provides a trove of biographical accounts of the leading figures of the two schools and would seem to be the earliest source. However greatly augmented biographical detail can be found in a number of later encyclopedic dictionaries, by authors such as Ibn Khallikan, Suyuti, and others. Basra, Kufa, and subsequently Baghdad, represent the main schools of innovation and development of Arabic grammar and punctuation, linguistics, philology, Quranic exegesis and recital, Hadith, poetry and literature.

== Major Philologists ==
- 'Amr (Abū) ibn al-'Alā (ca. 689–770), or Zabbān, born at Mecca and died at Kūfah; an eminent scholar and one of the seven readers of the Qur’ān. He burned his collections of old poetry, &c., to devote himself to religion.
- Aṣma’ī (al-) ‘Abd al-Mālik ibn Qurayb (c. 739-833) great humanist who flourished under Hārūn al-Rashid
- Du’alī (al-), Abū al-Aswad Ẓālim ibn Amr ibn Sufyān (ca. 605-688) originator of Arabic grammar and founder of Baṣrah school.
- Durayd (Ibn), Abū Bakr Muḥammad ibn al-Ḥasan (837-934), a distinguished philologist, genealogist, and poet, awarded a pension by caliph Al-Muqtadir for his contribution to science; principal works, his famous ode “The Maqṣūra,” a voluminous lexicon (al-'Jamhara fi ‘l-Lugha) and a treatise on the genealogies of the Arab tribes (Kitābu ‘l-Ishtiqāq).
- Fārisī (al-), Abū ‘Alī al-Ḥasan ibn Aḥmad ibn al-Ghaffār (901-987) He went to Baghdād and served at the Hamdanid court of Sayf al-Dawla and Buyid court of 'Adud al-Dawla.
- Jarmī (al-), Abū ‘Umar Ṣāliḥ ibn Isḥāq (d. 840) grammarian, student of al-Akhfash al-Awsat, Abū Zayd, Al-Aṣma’ī and others, who taught Al-Kitāb to al-Tawwazi and debated in Baghdād.
- Khalīl (al-) ibn Aḥmad, ‘Abd al-Raḥmān (ca. 718-786) inventor of the Arabic prosody who wrote the first Arabic dictionary Kitab al-Ayn; (uncompleted)
- Mubarrad (al-), Abū al-‘Abbās Muḥammad ibn Yazīd (d. 899 CE), philologist author of the book Al-Kāmil
- Quṭrub the Grammarian (d. 821), a Baṣrah native, leading philologist of his age, muhaddith and natural scientist.
- Sībawayh Abū Bishr ‘Amr ibn ‘Uthman (d. 793/796 CE), the Persian whose voluminous and seminal book of grammar, ‘‘Al-Kitab'’, is universally celebrated.
- Sukkarī (al-), Abū Sa’īd al-Ḥasan ibn al-Husayn (d. 889), a collector and critic of old Arabian poetry and ancient tradition.
- Thaqafī (al-), 'Īsā ibn 'Umar (d. 766/67) a noted early grammarian who taught Sībawayh and Al-Khalīl ibn Aḥmad. He was a Qur’ān reciter and was blind. His two known books The Compilation and The Perfected (Completed) were lost at an early period.
- 'Ubayda (Abū) Ma’mar ibn al-Muthannā (ca. 728–824)
- Yūnus ibn Ḥabīb, Abū ‘Abd al-Raḥmān (d. 798) Persian, expert on grammar inflection, lived to be 88 years old; - Meaning of the Quran; Languages (Vernaculars); The Large Book of Rare Forms [in the Qur'an]; Similes (Proverbs); The Small Book of Rare Forms
- Zajjāj (al-), Abū Isḥāq Ibrāhīm ibn Muḥammad ibn al-Sarī (or Surrī) (d. 922) a philologist, theologian and a court favourite to the Abbasid caliph al-Mu'tadid.

== Minor scholars ==
- Affar ibn Laqit
- Abu al-Bayda' al-Rabahi, tribesman, poet and language scholar
- Abu Malik 'Amr ibn Kirkirah, Arabian, 'warraq' and noted expert in vernacular, memorised corpus: - The Disposition of Man; Horses.
- Abu 'Irar, Arab of Banu 'Ijl, poet, literary stylist and linguist
- Abu Ziyad al-Sumuwi al-Kilabi, Arabian nomad, of Banu 'Amir ibn Kilab: - Rare Forms [in the Quran]; Differentiation; Camels; The Disposition of Man
- Abu Sawwar al-Ghanawi, (fl. C9th) authority for Arabic words

== Sources ==
- Nadīm (al-), Ibn Ishaq (1970). Dodge, Bayard (ed.). The Fihrist of al-Nadīm A Tenth Century Survey of Muslim Culture. New York & London: Columbia University Press.
- Flügel, Gustav (1862). Die grammatischen Schulen der Araber (German ed.). Leipzig: Brockhaus.
- Isbahani (al-), Abu al-Faraj 'Ali ibn al-Husayn (1868), Kitab al-Aghani, vol. 20, Cairo: Bulaq Press
- Isbahani (1900) [1888]. Kitab al-Aghani. Vol. V. Leiden: Brill.
- Kahhalah, Umar Rida (1957), Mu'jam al-Mu'allafin, vol. 15, Damascus: Al-Tariq Press
- Kahhalah (1961), Mu'jam, vol. XIII
- Khallikān, Aḥmad ibn Muhammad (ibn) (1843). Ibn Khallikan's Biographical Dictionary (translation of Wafayāt al-A'yān wa-Anbā Abnā' al-Zamān). Translated by William McGuckin de Slane. London: W. H. Allen. Four volumes vol I & II 1843, vol III 1868, vol IV 1873
- Nawawī (al-), Abū Zakarīyā’ (1847). Wüstenfeld, Ferdinand (ed.). kitāb Tahdhīb al-Asmā' (The Biographical Dictionary of Illustrious Men). Göttingen: Society for the Publication of Oriental Texts.
- Nicholson, Reynold Alleyne (1907), A Literary History of the Arabs (Archive.org ed.), London: T Fisher Unwin
- Qutaybah (Ibn), Abu Muhammad 'Abd Allah (1930) [1925]. Kitab 'Uyun al-Akhbar. Vol. III (Arabic ed.). Cairo: Dar al-Kutub al-Misriyah.
- Wright, William (1894). A Short History of Syriac Literature. London: Black.
- Yāqūt, Shīhab al-Dīn ibn ‘Abd Allāh al-Ḥamawī (1927) [1907]. Margoliouth, David Samuel (ed.). Irshād al-Arīb alā Ma'rifat al-Adīb (Yaqut's Dictionary of Learned Men). E. J. W. Gibb Memorial Series. Vol. 7. Leiden: Brill.
- Yāqūt, Shīhab al-Dīn ibn ‘Abd Allāh al-Ḥamawī (1970) [1966], Wüstenfeld, Ferdinand (ed.), Mu'jam Buldan (Jacut's Geographisches Worterbuch), vol. 6, Leipzig: Brockhaus
- Zirikli (al-), Khayr al-Din (1959) [1954]. "10". Al-A'lam. Vol. IX (2nd ed.). Cairo.
