= Quṭrub the Grammarian =

Arabic poet and scholar of Abbasid era

- Born: al-Baṣrah, Iraq
- Died: 821; Baghdād, Iraq
- Other names: Abū Alī Muḥammad ibn al-Mustanīr (ابو على محمد بن المستنير); Aḥmad ibn Muḥammad; al-Ḥasan ibn Muḥammad

Academic background
- Influences: Sibawayh

Academic work
- Era: Abbasid Caliphate
- School or tradition: Baṣrah school of grammar
- Notable works: Kitāb al-Muthalath (The Ternary), tafsir

Abū Alī Muḥammad ibn al-Mustanīr (أبو علي محمد بن المستنير), known as Quṭrub the Grammarian of al-Baṣrah, was a poet, a scientist, a scholar of Qur'anic exegesis (tafsir) and the leading philologist and linguist of his time. He wrote on a wide field of subjects and authored the first Kitāb al-Muthallath ('Ternary'), of which several later and extended versions were produced. He died in 821/22 (206 AH).

== Life ==
Quṭrub (Note: Quṭrub: field-mouse; owl; water insect; elf or goblin.) the Grammarian, Abū ‘Alī Muḥammad ibn al-Mustanīr, known also as Aḥmad ibn Muḥammad, or al-Ḥasan ibn Muḥammad; he studied under Sibawayh (Note: Sībawayh nicknamed him ‘Quṭrub’ as he came earliest to class.) and the Baṣran philologists, rivals of the Kūfah school. Quṭrub, and later his son al-Ḥasan, taught the sons of Abū Dulaf al-Qāsim ibn Īsā.

Quṭrub was a native of Baṣrah and a mawlā (apprentice) of Salīm ibn Ziād. The polymath Muḥammad ibn Ḥabīb (d.859/860) quoted Quṭrub along with Ibn al-A‘rābī, Abū ‘Ubaydah, Abū al-Yaqẓān, et al, who were among the scholars of genealogy, historical tradition, language, poetry and the tribes. The ḥāfiẓ of Baghdād Hārūn Ibn ‘Alī al-Munajjim, of the famous Munajjim family, included verses by Quṭrub in his Kitāb al-Bārī.

== Works ==
Among his written books were:

- Ma’ānī al-Qur’ān (كتاب معانى القرآن) ‘Meaning of the Qur’ān’; (rhetorical figures of the Qur’ān)
- Kitāb al-Ishtiqāq (كتاب الاشتقاق) 'Derivations' (Etymology);
- Kitāb al-Qawāfī (كتاب القوافى) (treatise on Rhymes);
- Kitāb al-Nawādir (كتاب النوادر) 'Rare Forms' (book of anecdotes);
- Kitāb al-Azmina (كتاب الازمنة) 'Periods' (Seasons);
- Kitāb al-Muthalath (Note: Al-Muthalath or the Ternary a philological treatise from which Ibn al-Sīd al-Baṭalyawsī Tibrīzi (Tauris) wrote extended versions. Also attributed to Abū al-Abbās Thalab.) (كتاب المثلث) The Ternary ‘Triple’; (Note: Three consonants, three dots, or some other meaning connected with linguistics.)
- Kitāb al-Farq (كتاب الفرق) 'Distinguishing' (anthropological and zoological anatomical terms);
- Kitāb al-Aswāt (كتاب الاصوات) 'Voices' (Interjections);
- Kitāb al-Sifāt (كتاب الصفات) 'Epithets' (Adjectives, Attributes);
- Kitāb al-‘Ilal fī al-Nahwī (كتاب العلل في النحو) 'The Weak Letters in Grammar';
- Kitāb al-Adhdād (كتاب الاضداد) 'Antonyms';
- Kitāb Khulq al-Faras (كتاب خلق الفرس) 'Nature of the Horse';
- Kitāb Khulq al-Insān (كتاب خلق الانسان) 'Nature of Man';
- Kitāb Al-Nihayah Fi Gharīb al-Ḥadīth wa'l-Athaar. (كتاب النهاية في غريب الحديث والآثار) 'Rare Expressions in the Ḥadīth'; (Note: On unusual colloquialisms in the Ḥadīth; ‘’See’’ notes Bayard Dodge (ed.); Fihrist, I, 190, n88.)
- Kitāb al-Radd ‘alā ‘l-Mulhidīn fī Mutashābu ‘l-Qur’ān (كتاب الردّ على الملحدين في متشابه القرآن) 'Refutation of the Heretics, about the metaphorical (anthropomorphic) interpretations in the Qur’ān';
- Kitāb al-Hamz (كتاب الهمز) 'The Letter Hamza';
- Kitāb al-Fa‘ala wa-Af‘ala (كتاب فعل وافعل) 'Verbs in First and Fourth Class';
- Kitāb I’rāb al-Qur’ān (كتاب اعراب القرآن) 'Inflection (Declension) of the Qur’ān'. (Note: This title is omitted in the Beatty MS.)
- Kitāb fī al-Anwā’ (كتاب في الانواء) 'Al-Anwā’'

== Bibliography ==
- Flügel, Gustav (1862). Die Grammatischen Schulen der Araber (in German). Leipzig: Brockhaus. p. 65.
- Khallikān (ibn), Aḥmad ibn Muḥammad (1843). Ibn Khallikān's Biographical Dictionary (translation of Wafayāt al-A'yān wa-Anbā'). Vol. II. Translated by MacGuckin de Slane. London: Oriental Translation Fund of Britain and Ireland.
- Khallikān (ibn), Aḥmad ibn Muḥammad (1868). Ibn Khallikān's Biographical Dictionary (translation of Wafayāt al-A'yān wa-Anbā'). Vol. III. Translated by MacGuckin de Slane. London: Oriental Translation Fund of Britain and Ireland. pp. 29–30.
- Nadīm (al-), Abū al-Faraj Muḥammad ibn Isḥāq Abū Ya’qūb al-Warrāq (1970). Dodge, Bayard (ed.). The Fihrist of al-Nadim; a tenth-century survey of Muslim culture. New York & London: Columbia University Press.
- Vilmar, Eduard (1856), De Qutrubo, antiquissimo Arabum lexicographo commentatio adiecta carminis de vocibus Tergiminis, quod ad illum auctorem refertur e codicibus manuscriptis editi (Thesis/dissertation) (in Latin), Marburg, OCLC 51066371
- Vilmar, Eduard (1857). Carmen de vocibus tergeminis Arabicis ad Qutrubum : auctorem relatum e codicibus manuscriptis (in Latin). Marburgi Cattorum. OCLC 768102084.

== See also ==
- List of Arab scientists and scholars
- Encyclopædia Britannica Online
