= Abu Ishaq al-Zajjaj =

Abbasid era Grammarian of Basrah

Abū Isḥāq Ibrāhīm ibn Muḥammad ibn al-Sarī (Surrī) al-Zajjāj
- أبو إسحاق إبراهيم بن محمد بن السري الزجاج
- Born: c. 842
- Died: 13 October 922 (aged 80); Baghdad
- Other name: The Glassman
- Occupation: Grammarian
- Years active: caliph al-Mu’taḍid

Academic work
- Era: Abbāsid
- School or tradition: School of Baṣrah
- Main interests: philology, theology, philosophy, linguistics, natural science
- Notable works: Kitāb mā fassarahu min jāmi‘ an-nuṭq (كتاب ما فسّرة من جامع النطق); 'Exposition of the "Compendium of Speech"'

Abū Isḥāq Ibrāhīm ibn Muḥammad ibn al-Sarī al-Zajjāj (Arabic: أبو إسحاق إبراهيم بن محمد بن السري الزجاج) was a grammarian of Basrah, a scholar of philology and theology and a favourite at the Abbāsid court. He died in 922 (Note: Al-Zubaydī gives his date of death as 316/928.) at Baghdād, the capital city in his time.

== Life ==
Abū Isḥāq Ibrāhīm ibn Muḥammad al-Sarī (Surrī) al-Zajjāj had been a glass-grinder – al-Zajjāj means 'the glassman' – before abandoning this trade to study philology under the two leading grammarians, al-Mubarrad of the Baṣran school and Tha'lab of the Kufan school. As top student and class representative he advised al-Mubarrad. He studied "Al-Kitāb" of Sībawayh with the Baṣrah grammarian Abū Fahd. (Note: Abū Fahd wrote a book about grammar titled "The Exposition".)

Al-Zajjāj entered the Abbāsid court, first as tutor to al-Qāsim ibn ‘Ubayd Allāh, (Note: Al-Qāsim became vizier to both al-Mu’taḍid and his successor al-Muktafi, in whose reign he died. He was a skilled a politician.) son of the vizier ‘Ubayd Allāh ibn Sulaymān ibn Wahb’s (Note: Vizier to al-Mu’taḍid, and an able statesman, d. 901 (288 h.)) and later, as tutor to the sons of the caliph al-Mu‘taḍid.

On his succession to the vizierate, Caliph al-Mu’taḍid ordered vizier al-Qāsim to commission an exposition of the Compendium of Speech by Maḥbarah al-Nadīm. (Note: Maḥbarah was the laqab (nickname) of Muḥammad ibn Yaḥyā ibn Abī ‘Abbād, Abū Ja’far al-Nadim, the court companion of al-Mu’taḍid.) Both Tha’lab and Al-Mubarrad declined the project for lack of knowledge and old age respectively. Al-Mubarrad proposed his friend and relative novice al-Zajjāj, who was commissioned to work on just two sections as a trial of his abilities. In doing his research he consulted books on language by Tha‘lab, al-Sukkarī, et al. He was assisted by al-Tirmidhī the Younger, as his amanuensis. The bound two-section commentary greatly impressed Caliph al-Mu’taḍid and al-Zajjāj was given the work to complete the commentary for the payment of three hundred gold dīnār. The finished manuscript was kept in al-Mu’taḍid's royal library, and the issuing of any copies to other libraries was prohibited. (Note: This library was destroyed probably in 945/46 when Aḥmad ibn Buwayh captured Baghdād and blinded caliph al-Mu’taḍid, who later died, perhaps from poisoning. However, the fact that Muḥammad ibn Isḥaq al-Nadīm writes that he, and his circle of scholars, had seen the manuscript on fine paper, suggests it may have escaped destruction.)

Winning the caliph's favour, he received a royal pension of three hundred gold dīnār from three official roles as court companion, jurist and scholar.

Among al-Zajjāj's pupils were the grammarian Abū Alī al-Fārisī and Abū ‘l-Qāsim Abd ar-Raḥmān, author of the Jumal fi ‘n-Nawhi, (Note: Abū ‘l-Qāsim Abd ar-Raḥmān was called al-Zajjājī after him.) Ibn al-Sarrāj and ‘Alī al-Marāghī (Note: Abū Bakr Muḥammad ibn ‘Alī al-Marāghī was a scholar of philology and religion from the city of al-Marāghah at the time the capital of Maragheh County, East Azerbaijan Province, Iran. Although al-Marāghī stayed at al-Mawṣil, he was al-Zajjāj’ pupil. He wrote; "Abridgment of Grammar"; "Exposition and Interpretation of the Arguments of Sībawayh",) the rival of Abu al-‘Abbās Tha’lab.

Al-Zajjāj had a dispute with al-Khayyāṭ, a grammarian-theologian of Samarqand, whom he met in Baghdād.

Al-Zajjāj died at Baghdād on 13 October 922 [Friday, 18th, or 19th, Jumada al-Akhirah 310 AH] – other sources give 924 and 928 [311 and 316 AH.], aged over eighty.

== Selected works ==
- Kitāb mā fassarahu min jāmi‘ an-nuṭq (كتاب ما فسّرة من جامع النطق); 'Exposition of the "Compendium of Speech"'. Ibn Khallikān describes this as "Extracts from his complete Treatise on Logic with his own commentary"; (Note: Probably taken from al-Zajjāj’s treatise titled 'Jāmi al-munṭaq' (جامع المنطق), mentioned in Kaşf az-Zunūn ‘an 'asāmī ‘l-Kutub wa-l’fanūn, the biblio-bibliographical dictionary of Hajji Khalifa)
- Kitāb ma’ānī al-Qur’ān (كتاب معانى القرآن), 'Meaning of the Quran'; tafsir (exegesis) of ambiguities, metaphors and figurative expressions.
- Kitāb al-Ishtiqāq (كتاب الاشتقاق); Etymology (Note: Khallikān calls this "Different treatises on etymology".)
- Kitāb al-Qawāfī (كتاب القوافى); (Note: Listed by al-Nadīm but not Ibn Khallikān)
- Kitāb al-‘Arūḍ (كتاب العروض); Prosody
- Kitāb al-farqu (كتاب الفرق); Differentiation (Note: Ibn Khallikān gives the title "Muslim Sects".)
- Kitāb kulq al-Insān (كتاب خلق الانسان); The nature of Man
- Kitāb kulq al-faris (كتال خلق الفرس); The nature of the Horse
- Kitāb mukhtaṣir nuḥw (كتاب مختصر نحو); Abridgment of Grammar
- Kitāb Fa‘altu wa-Af‘altu (كتاب فعلت وافعلت); on the first and fourth Arabic verb forms
- Kitāb mā yunṣarif wa-mā lā yunṣarif (كتاب ما ينصرف وما لا ينصرف); 'What Is Inflected and What Is Not Inflected' (Note: Ibn Khallikān gives the title "On Nouns of the First or Second Declension")
- Kitāb ṣahr abyāt Sībawayh (كتاب شرح ابيات سيبويه); Commentary on the verses in the grammar of Sībawayh;
- Kitāb an-nawādir (كتاب النوادر); Book of Rare Forms.
- Book of Dictates; (Note: Dictates (امالي); The last three titles are omitted by al-Nadīm.)
- Book of Anecdotes;
- Treatise on the influence of the constellation upon the weather (Note: Hajji Khalifa remarks that a considerable number of works has been written on the subject.)

Abū Alī al-Fārisī wrote a treatise in refutation of al-Zajjāj, titled Kitāb al-masā’il al-maslahat yurwiha ‘an az-Zajjāj wa-tu’raf bi-al-Aghfāl (كتاب المسائل المصلحة يرويها عن الزجاج وتعرف بالاغفال); the Aghfāl ('Negligences', or 'Beneficial (Corrected) Questions'), in which he refutes al-Zajjāj in his book Maāni (Rhetoric).

== See also ==
- List of Arab scientists and scholars
