= Etymology of Arab =

Origin of the term "Arab"

The proper name Arab or Arabian (and cognates in other languages) has been used to translate several different but similar-sounding words in ancient and classical texts which do not necessarily have the same meaning or origin. The etymology of the term is closely linked to that of the place name Arabia.

== Semitic etymology ==
The root of the word has many meanings in Semitic languages including desert, nomad, merchant, and comprehensible with all of these having varying degrees of relevance to the emergence of the name. It is also possible that some forms were metathetical from root ع-ب-ر ʿ-B-R "moving around", and hence, it is alleged, "nomadic".

The plurality of meanings results partly from the assimilation of the proto-Semitic غ ghayin with ع ʿayin in some languages. In Hebrew the word ערב ʿarav thus has the same triconsonantal root as the root meaning "west" (מערב maʿarav) "setting sun" or "evening" (מעריב maʿariv, ערב ʿerev). The direct Arabic cognate of this is غرب ġarb ("west", etc.) rather than عرب ʿarob; however, in Ugaritic and Sayhadic, languages which normally preserve proto-Semitic ghayin, this root is found with ʿayin adding to the confusion. The first recorded use of the root is in the Hebrew word עֶ֥רֶב ereb, Genesis 1:5, and its meaning there is "evening."

== In Arabic ==
The oldest surviving indication of an Arab identity is an inscription made in early Arabic using the Nabatean Aramaic alphabet in 328 CE, which refers to Imru' al-Qays ibn 'Amr as "King of all the Arabs". The earliest attestation of the term ‘the Arabs’, written in Arabic script in a documentary source, is found in an Egyptian papyrus from the late 7th century CE.

In the Qur'an, the word عرب ʿarab does not appear, only the nisba adjective, ʿarabiyy-un: The Qur'an is referring to itself as عربيّ ʿarabiyy-un "Arabic" and مبين mubīn-un "clear". The two qualities are connected, for example in Quran 43:2-3, "By the clear Book: We have made it an Arabic recitation in order that you may understand", and the Qur'an came to be regarded as the prime example of العربية al-ʿarabiyyatu, the language of the Arabs. The term ʾiʿrāb is from the same root, referring to a particularly clear and correct mode of speech. Bedouin elders still use this term with the same meaning; those whose speech they comprehend (i.e. Arabic-speakers) they call Arab, and those whose speech is of unknown meaning to them, they call عجم ʿajam (or عجمي ʿajamī ). In the Persian Gulf region, the term Ajam is often used to refer to the Persians.

The plural noun ʾaʿrāb refers to the Bedouin tribes of the desert who rejected Islam, for example in Quran 9:97,

الأعراب أشدّ كفرًا و نفاقًا
al-ʾaʿrāb-u ʾašadd-u kufr-an wa-nifāq-an
"the Bedouin are worse in disbelief and hypocrisy".

Based on this, in early Islamic terminology, عرب ʿarab referred to sedentary Arabs, living in cities such as Mecca and Medina, and أعراب ʾaʿrāb referred to the Arab Bedouins, carrying a negative connotation as shown in the prior Qur'anic verse. Following the Islamic conquest of the 8th century, however, the language of the nomadic Arabs came to be regarded as preserving the highest purity by the grammarians following Abi Ishaq, and the term كلام العرب kalam al-ʿArab "language of the Arabs" came to denote the uncontaminated language of the Bedouins.

Cf. the modern toponyms Algarve (from Gharb al-Andalus) and Arava

== In Assyrian ==
The term mâtu arbâi describing Gindibu is found in Assyrian texts and is translated as of Arab land. Variations of the ethnonym are also found including: ʿArabi, ʿArubu, ʿAribi and ʿUrbi. The presence of Proto-Arabic names amongst those qualified by the terms arguably justifies the translation "Arab" although it is not certain if they all in fact represent the same group. They may plausibly be borrowings from Aramaic or Canaanite of words derived from either the proto-Semitic root ġ-r-b or ʿ-r-b.

It is in the case of the Assyrian forms that a possible derivation from ġ-r-b ("west") is most plausible, referring to people or land lying west of Assyria in a similar vein to the later Greek use of the term Saracen meaning in Arabic "Easterners", šarqiyyūn for people living in the east.

The word 'Arab' is thought by some Historians to be an Assyrian word, meaning "Westerner". The first written reference to Arabs was by the Assyrian King Sennacherib, 800 B.C., in which he tells of conquering the "ma'rabayeh" (Westerners).

== In Hebrew ==
In Hebrew the words ʿarav and ʿaravah literally mean "desert" or "steppe". In the Hebrew Bible the latter feminine form is used exclusively for the Aravah, a region associated with the Nabateans, who spoke Arabic. The former masculine form is used in Isaiah 21:13 and Ezekiel 27:21 for the region of the settlement of Kedar in the Syrian Desert. 2 Chronicles 9:14 contrasts "kings of ʿarav" with "governors of the country" when listing those who brought tribute to King Solomon. The word is typically translated Arabia and is the name for Arabia in Modern Hebrew. The New Revised Standard Version of the Bible uses instead the literal translation "desert plain" for the verse in Isaiah. The adjectival noun ʿaravi formed from ʿarav is used in Isaiah 13:20 and Jeremiah 3:2 for a desert dweller. It is typically translated Arabian or Arab and is the modern Hebrew word for Arab. The New Revised Standard Version uses the translation "nomad" for the verse in Jeremiah.

In the Bible, the word ʿarav is closely associated with the word ʿerev meaning a "mix of people" which has identical spelling in unvowelled text. Jeremiah 25:24 parallels "kings of ʿarav" with "kings of the ʿerev that dwell in the wilderness". The account in 1 Kings 10:15 matching 2 Chronicles 9:14 is traditionally vowellized to read "kings of the ʿerev ". The people in question are understood to be the early Nabateans who do indeed appear to have been a mix of different tribes. The medieval writer Ibn an-Nadim, in Kitab al-Fihrist, derived the word "Arab" from a Syriac pun by Abraham on the same root: in his account, Abraham addresses Ishmael and calls him uʿrub, from Syriac ʿrob, "mingle".

The Bible Kings I 10:15 also refers to the 'Kings of Ereb' - וְכׇל־מַלְכֵ֥י הָעֶ֖רֶב. This is in context of a listing of King Solomon's great wealth, of which some came from his apparent vassals and lesser potents. Commentators there link the word ereb to the Hebrew word for dependence, guarantee, guarantor, patron, and collateral (see for example Genesis 45:32). Commentators explicitly assume these Kings of Ereb are linked with the ethnic grouping, Arab. The etymology thus means Arabs were vassal kings or lords, in this case, subservient to the ruling Jewish kings of the time and region.

The early Nabateans are also referred to as ʿarvim in Nehemiah 4:7 and the singular ʿarvi is applied to Geshem a leader who opposed Nehemiah. This term is identical to ʿaravi in unvowelled text but traditionally vowelized differently. It is usually translated "Arabian" or "Arab" and was used in early 20th century Hebrew to mean Arab. However it is unclear if the term related more to ʿarav or to ʿerev. On the one hand its vowelization resembles that of the term ʿarvati (Arbathite) which is understood as an adjective formed from ʿaravah; thus it is plausibly a similarly formed adjective from ʿarav and thus a variant of ʿaravi. On the other hand, it is used in 2 Chronicles 21:16 for a seemingly different people located in Africa plausibly the same Africans referred to as an ʿerev (mix of people) in Ezekiel 30:5. Any of the other meanings of the root are also possible as the origin of the name.

The words ʿaravim (plural of ʿaravi ) and ʿarvim appear the same in unvowelled texts as the word ʿorvim meaning ravens. The occurrences of the word in 1 Kings 17:4-6 are traditionally vowellized to read ʿorvim. In the Talmud (Chullin 5a) a debate is recorded as to whether the passage refers to birds or to a people so named, noting a Midianite chieftain named Oreb (ʿorev: raven) and the place of his death, the Rock of Oreb. Jerome understood the term as the name of a people of a town which he described as being in the confines of the Arabians. (Genesis Rabba mentions a town named Orbo near Beth Shean.) One meaning of the root ʿ-r-b in Hebrew is "exchange/trade" (laʿarov: "to exchange", maʿarav: "merchandise") whence ʿorvim can also be understood to mean "exchangers" or "merchants", a usage attested in the construct form in Ezekiel 27:27 which speaks of ʿorvei maʿaravekh: "exchangers of thy merchandise". The Ferrar Fenton Bible translates the term as "Arabians" in 1 Kings 17:4-6.

2 Chronicles 26:17 mentions a people called ʿArviyim who lived in Gur-baal. Their name differs from those mentioned above in the Bible in that it contains an extra letter yod but is also translated "Arabian". 2 Chronicles 17:11 mentions a people called Arvi'im who brought Jehoshaphat tribute of rams and he-goats. Their name is also generally translated as "Arabians" although it differs noticeably in spelling from the above-mentioned names as it contains the letter aleph at the end of the stem. Nothing else is known about these groups.

== Bibliography ==
- Edward Lipinski, Semitic Languages: Outlines of a Comparative Grammar, 2nd ed., Orientalia Lovanensia Analecta: Leuven 2001. ISBN 90-429-0815-7
- The Catholic Encyclopedia, Robert Appleton Company, 1907, Online Edition, K. Night 2003: article Arabia
- The Jewish Encyclopedia, Funk and Wagnalls, 1901-1906, Online Edition, JewishEncyclopedia.com, 2002: article Arabia
- The New Revised Standard Version, Division of Christian Education of the National Council of the Churches of Christ in the United States of America, 1989, 1995.
- Fenton, Ferrar. The Holy Bible in modern English : containing the complete Sacred Scriptures of the Old and New Testaments, Destiny Publishers, Merrimac, Massachusetts, U.S.A., 1906, 1966. OCLC 234057370
- Grunebaum, G. E. von (1970). Classical Islam: A History 600 A.D. - 1258 A.D.. Aldine Publishing Company. ISBN 0-202-15016-X
- Durant, Will (1950). The Age of Faith: A History of Medieval Civilization -- Christian, Islamic, and Judaic -- from Constantine to Dante: A.D. 325-1300. The Story of Civilization, volume IV. New York: Simon and Schuster. OCLC 45079949.
