= Sibawayh the Phonologist =

Book by A. A. Al-Nassir

Sibawayh the phonologist. A critical study of the phonetic and phonological theory of Sibawayh as presented in his treatise Al-Kitab
- Author: Abdulmun'im Abdulamir al Nassir
- Language: English
- Subject: phonology
- Publisher: Kegan Paul International
- Publication date: 1993
- Media type: Print (hardcover)
- Pages: pp. xx, 130 + pp. 12 (Arabic)
- ISBN: 978-0710303561

Sibawayh the phonologist: A critical study of the phonetic and phonological theory of Sibawayh as presented in his treatise Al-Kitab is a 1993 book by A. A. Al-Nassir in which the author examines the views of Sibawayh on phonology. The book is based on Al-Nassir's doctoral dissertation (1985) at the University of York under the supervision of John Kelly.

== Reception ==
The book was reviewed by John McCarthy, Yasir Suleiman and M. G. Carter.
