= Abu Ali al-Farisi =

10th-century Persian grammarian of Arabic

Abū 'Ali al-Ḥasan ibn Aḥmad ibn al-Ghaffār al-Fārisī
- Born: 901; Fasa, Fars, Iran
- Died: August 16, 987 (aged 85–86); Baghdad
- Other names: Abū Alī al-Ḥasan Aḥmad Abd al-Ghaffar ibn Muḥammad ibn Sulaymān ibn Abān al-Fārisī; and Abū Alī 'l-Fasawi (Note: Fasawi is derived from the town of Basa, in the province of Fars; the name is pronounced Fasa in Arabic, from which the relative adjective "Fasawī" is derived.)
- Years active: Hammadids, Buyids and Abbasids

Academic work
- Discipline: Grammarian
- School or tradition: School of al-Baṣrah

Abū 'Alī al-Fārisī (Arabic: أبو علي الفارسي); surnamed Abū Alī al Ḥasan Aḥmad Abd al-Ghaffār Ibn Muḥammad ibn Sulaimān ibn Abān al-Fārisī (c. 901 – 987) (Note: Khallikān gives these dates however al-Nadīm states he died before 370 h. (980/81)); was a leading grammarian of the school of al-Baṣrah of mixed Arab and Iranian heritage. He lived in Baghdād and later served at the courts of Sayf al-Dawla at Aleppo and 'Aḍud al-Dawlah at Shiraz. His nephew was Abi al-Hussein Muhammad Bin al-Hassan Bin Abd al-Wareth al-Faressi al-Nawawi, who instructed the celebrated theorist al-Jurjānī on al-Fārisī's grammatical treatise, the Idah.

== Life ==
Abū 'Ali al-Ḥasan ibn Ahmad ibn al-Ghaffār al-Fārisī, was known as Abū Alī, or sometimes al-Fasawī. He was born in the town of Fasa in Fars province in 901. He was born to a Persian father and an Arab mother. In 919, he went to Baghdād to study. He travelled widely and spent a period with Sayf ad-Dawlah ibn Hamdān, the Hamdanid ruler at Aleppo in 952/953, where he held conferences with the famous court poet al-Mutanabbi (915–965). He continued on to Fars, and gained favour at the Buyid court of 'Aḍud al-Dawlah ibn Buwaih in Shirāz.

Ibn Khallikan recounts a grammatical contest at the hippodrome, ('Maidān') between Abū Alī and the prince 'Aḍud al-Dawlah, on a finer point of grammar over the use of the accusative case. In the expression:

The people came except Zaid (venti populus si non Zeidum)?

The prince argued that 'Zaid' should be in the nominative and not in the accusative case. When Abū Alī maintained that the verb is understood in the ellipse and therefore 'Zaid' is governed by the accusative, the prince challenged: "Why not use the nominative to fill the ellipse as:

Zaid kept back (abstinuit Zeidus)?

Abū Alī conceded he was stumped by this remark saying;

This is a game of give and take – i.e. 'you win some you lose some'

However 'Aḍud is reported to have said:

In grammar I am the humble servant of Abū Alī 'l-Fasawi.

Abū Alī dedicated his grammatical works, the Idāh (illustration) and Takmila (supplement), to 'Aḍud and composed a treatise on the subject of his debate with the prince which contained 'Aḍud ad-Dawlah's approbation. In his Idāh, he mentions that the exception is governed in the accusative by the verb which precedes (i.e. by the verb 'came'), in consequence of its corroboration by the word except. Ibn Khallikān relates another anecdote about a conversation between the poet Abū 'l-Qāsim ibn Aḥmad al-Andalusī and Abū Alī. The grammarian had expressed envy of Abū 'l-Qāsim's genius in poetry and admitted to his own lack, despite, as a grammarian, having expertise in the scientific basis of poetry. He claimed then he had only ever composed three verses which run:

I dyed my grey hairs when they were reproached; but the dyeing of grey hairs deserves reproach. It was not censure or reproach I feared but that my love would leave me; because my grey hairs are to blame, I dyed them as punishment.

'Aḍud ad-Dawlat was fond of repeating a quote by Abū Tammām, given in Abū Alī's treatise Idāh to explain the rule about the verb (كان),'to be':

He, of whose resolutions and intentions the meadow of vain desire is the pasture ground will ever remain poor.

Ibn Khallikān relates a dream he had while in Cairo that he met three pilgrims in an ancient funeral chapel (Note: Mujāwirūn; the Mujāwirat means a religious retreat, or residence at a mosque, or a chapel built over a tomb of a holy man.) in the village of Kalyūb (Note: Kalyūb was then a village with numerous gardens at two or three parasangs distance from Cairo). One pilgrim mentioned that the sheikh Abū Alī 'l-Fārisī had lived there for many years; and that he had been a talented poet among other things. Ibn Khallikān had never came across any of his poetry. So in a sweet voice the man recited three verses. When he awoke the charming voice was still in his ears, but he could only recall this, the last verse:

People in prosperity are pleased with no one: what must they be when they suffer affliction or afflict others?

He was suspected of being a Mutazilite (Note: Edward Pococke's Specimen Hist. Arab). He died at Baghdād on Sunday the 17th of Rabi' al-thani (some say Rabi' al-awwal) 377 h. (Aug 987) He was interred in the cemetery of "Shūnīzi".

== Works ==
- Idāh (الإضاءة); 'Illustration' and Takmila (supplement); grammatical works; (Note: Not listed but mentioned in text of Ibn Khallikan, I p.379)
- Kitāb al-masā'il al-maslahat yurwiha 'an az-Zajjāj wa-tu'raf bi-al-Aghfāl (كتاب المسائل المصلحة يرويها عن الزجاج وتعرف بالاغفال); the Aghfāl (negligences), or 'Beneficial (Corrected) Questions', in which he refutes al-Zajjāj in his Maāni (rhetoric);
- Kitāb ḥujja (كتاب الحجة); (Proof) (Note: On the readings of the Qur'ān. The Qur'ān was orig without diacritical points to vowels, punctuation, and uniform verse demarcation, so considerable textual uncertainty pertained. To address these three causes, together with traditional intonational and accentual variations, seven distinct authorised systems of reading the Qur'ān text arose, called the seven readings. The best commentators such as al-Baidawī and az-Zamakhshari are always careful to mark any contentious words.) Argument That the Seven Readers Were the Imams of the Cities, as Designated by Abū Bakr Aḥmad ibn Mūsā ibn al-'Abbās ibn Mujāhid;
- Kitāb taḍkira (كتاب التذكرة); The Recollection (Remembrance), a large volume;
- Kitāb mukhtaṣir 'awāmil al'a'rāb (كتاب مختصر عوامل الاعراب); Elucidation in Grammar;
- Kitāb abyāt al-a'rāb (كتاب ابيات الاعراب); Verses (Tents) of the Arabians; (Note: This title and the one which follows are not in the Beatty MS.)
- Digest of Governing Words in Declension (Conjugation);
- Questions discussed in al-Baghdādī; al-Ḥalabī; al-Shirāzī (Note: These first three titles are included in al-Fihrist but may have been added by the Beatty MS scribe after he had transcribed the original text about al-Fārisī, or by a later scribe.) and al-Baṣrah (Note: Only Khallikān lists four cities and notes each form a separate work.)
- Treatise on the short and long Alif; (Note: See de Sacy's Grammaire arabe, t. I. pp.92, 95)
- The Hundred Agents (or governing parts of speech); (Note: See A. Lockett introduction to Abd al-Qahir al-Jurjani's "Mi'ut Amil")
- Questions discussed at Conferences, etc.

== Bibliography ==
- Fatehi-nezhad, Enayatollah; Rahimi, Simin (2008). "Abū ʿAlī al-Fārisī". In Madelung, Wilferd; Daftary, Farhad (eds.). Encyclopaedia Islamica Online. Brill Online. ISSN 1875-9831.
- Flügel, Gustav Leberecht (1872). J. Roediger; A. Mueller (eds.). Al-Fihrist (in Arabic). Leipzig: F.C.W. Vogel.
- Khallikān (ibn), Aḥmad ibn Muḥammad (1843). Ibn Khallikan's Biographical Dictionary. Translated by Mac Guckin de Slane, William. Paris: W. H. Allen.
- Nadīm (al), Abū al-Faraj Muḥammad ibn Isḥāq Abū Ya'qūb al-Warrāq (1970). Dodge, Bayard (ed.). The Fihrist of al-Nadim; a tenth-century survey of Muslim culture. New York & London: Columbia University Press.
- Sacy (de), Antoine Isaac Silvestre (1904). Grammaire arabe (in French). Tunis: Institut de Carthage. ISBN 2011342236.
- Weipert, Reinhard (2012). "al-Fārisī, Abū ʿAlī". In Fleet, Kate; Krämer, Gudrun; Matringe, Denis; Nawas, John; Rowson, Everett (eds.). Encyclopaedia of Islam (3rd ed.). Brill Online. doi:10.1163/1573-3912_ei3_COM_26985. ISSN 1873-9830.
