= Al-Khalil ibn Ahmad al-Farahidi =

Iraqi lexicographer, philologist and poet (718 – 786 CE)

al-Khalīl ibn Aḥmad al-Farāhīdī
- أبو عبد الرحمن الخليل بن أحمد بن عمرو بن تمام الفراهيدي الأزدي اليحمدي
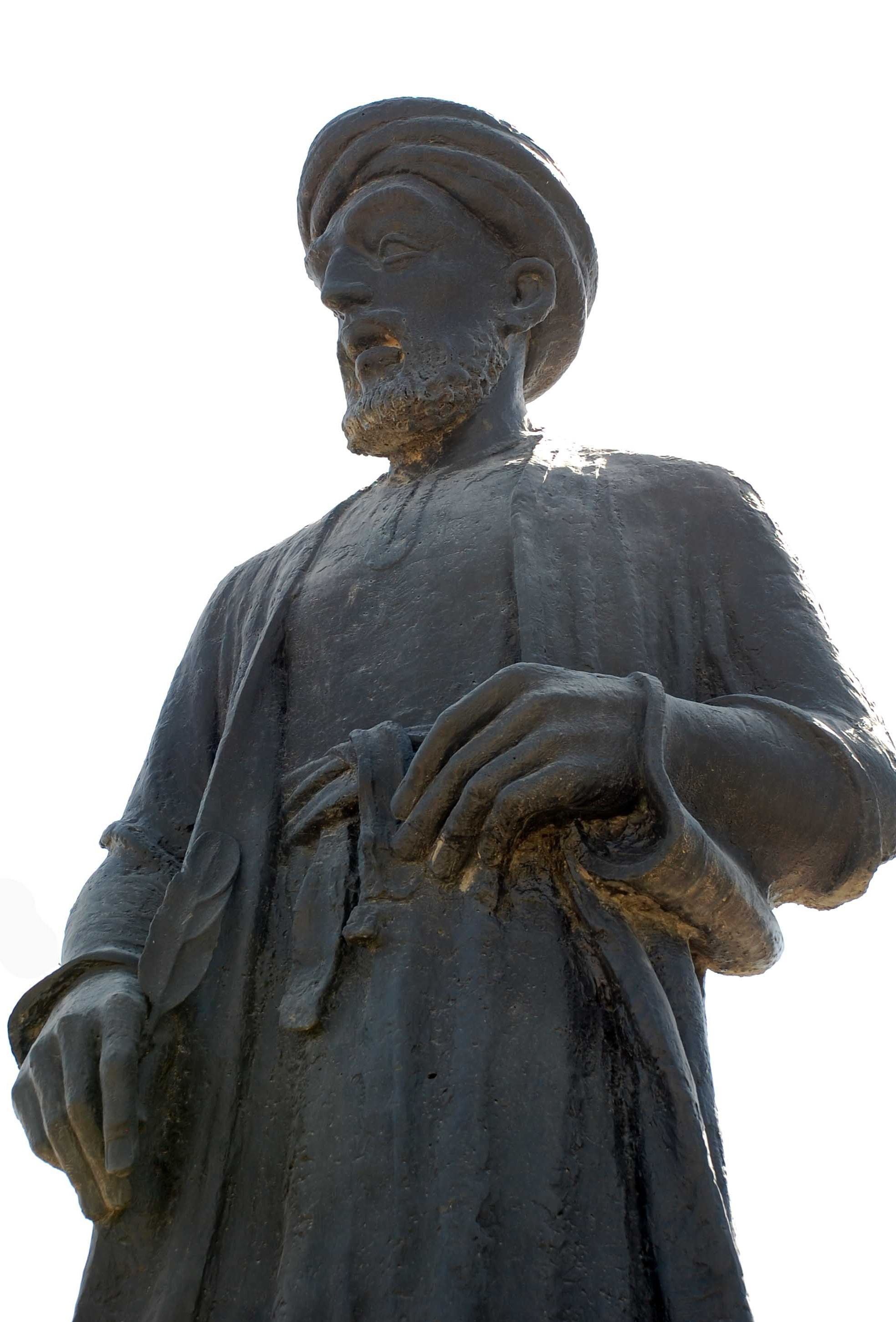
- ·1965-1970 Sculpture of al-Frahidi in Basra
- Title: Genius of the Arabic language (Abqarī al-lughah)

Personal life
- Born: 718 CE; Oman
- Died: 786 or 791 CE; Basra
- Era: Islamic Golden Age
- Main interest(s): Lexicography, philology
- Notable idea(s): Harakat, Arabic prosody
- Notable work: Kitab al-'Ayn
- Occupation: Lexicographer

Religious life
- Religion: Islam

Muslim leader
- Influenced by: Abu 'Amr ibn al-'Ala'
- Influenced: Sibawayh, al-Asma'i, al-Raghib al-Isfahani, al-Kindi

Abu ‘Abd ar-Raḥmān al-Khalīl ibn Aḥmad ibn ‘Amr ibn Tammām al-Farāhīdī al-Azdī al-Yaḥmadī (Arabic: أبو عبد الرحمن الخليل بن أحمد بن عمرو بن تمام الفراهيدي الأزدي اليحمدي; 718 – 786 CE), known as al-Farāhīdī, (Note: Muḥammad ibn Ishāq al-Nadīm calls him ‘Abd al-Raḥmān ibn Aḥmad al-Khalīl (عبد الرحمن ابن احمد الخليل) and gives the report that his paternal ancestry was of the Azd clan of the Farāhīd (فراهيد) tribe, and mentions that Yunus ibn Habib would call him Farhūdī (فرهودى)) or al-Khalīl, was an Arab philologist, lexicographer and leading grammarian of Basra in Iraq. He made the first dictionary of the Arabic language – and the oldest extant dictionary – Kitab al-'Ayn (Arabic: كتاب العين "The Source") – introduced the now standard harakat (vowel marks in Arabic script) system, and was instrumental in the early development of ʿArūḍ (study of prosody), musicology and poetic metre. His linguistic theories influenced the development of Persian, Turkish, Kurdish, and Urdu prosody. The "Shining Star" of the Basran school of Arabic grammar, a polymath and scholar, was a man of genuinely original thought.

Al-Farahidi was the first scholar to subject the prosody of Classical Arabic poetry to a detailed phonological analysis. The primary data he listed and categorized in meticulous detail was extremely complex to master and utilize, and later theorists developed simpler formulations with greater coherence and general utility. He was also a pioneer in the field of cryptography and influenced the work of al-Kindi.

== Life ==
Born in 718 in Oman, southern Arabia, to Azdi parents of modest means, al-Farahidi became a leading grammarian of Basra in Iraq. In Basra, he studied Islamic traditions and philology under Abu 'Amr ibn al-'Ala' with Aiyūb al-Sakhtiyāni, ‘Āṣm al-Aḥwal, al-‘Awwām b. Ḥawshab, etc. His teacher Ayyub persuaded him to renounce the Ibāḍi doctrine and convert to Sunni orthodoxy; Among his pupils were Sibawayh, al-Naḍr b. Shumail, and al-Layth b. al-Muẓaffar b. Naṣr. Known for his piety and frugality, he was a companion of Jābir ibn Zayd, the founder of ibadism. It was said that his parents were converts to Islam and that his father was the first to be named "Ahmad" after the time of Muhammad. His nickname, "Farahidi", differed from his tribal name and derived from an ancestor named Furhud (Young Lion); plural farahid. He refused lavish gifts from rulers or to indulge in the slander and gossip his fellow Arab and Persian rival scholars were wont to, and he performed an annual pilgrimage to Mecca. He lived in a small reed house in Basra and once remarked that when his door was shut, his mind did not go beyond it. He taught linguistics, and some of his students became wealthy teachers. Al-Farahidi's main income was falconry and a garden inherited from his father. Two dates of death are cited, 786 and 791 CE. The story goes that a theoretical contemplation brought about his death. On the particular day, while he was deeply absorbed in contemplation of a system of accounting to save his maidservant from being cheated by the green grocer, he wandered into a mosque, and there he absent-mindedly bumped into a pillar and was fatally injured.

== Views ==
Al-Farahidi's eschewing of material wealth has been noted by several biographers. In his old age, the son of Habib ibn al-Muhallab and reigning governor of the Muhallabids offered al-Farahidi a pension and requested that the latter tutor the former's son. Al-Farahidi declined, stating that he was wealthy though possessing no money, as true poverty lay not in a lack of money, but in the soul. The governor reacted by rescinding the pension, an act to which al-Farahidi responded with the following lines of poetry:

"He, who formed me with a mouth, engaged to give me nourishment till such a time as He takes me to Himself. Thou hast refused me a trifling sum, but that refusal will not increase thy wealth."

Embarrassed, the governor responded with an offer to renew the pension and double the rate, which al-Farahidi still greeted with a lukewarm reception. Al-Farahidi's apathy about material wealth was demonstrated in his habit of quoting Akhtal's famous stanza: "If thou wantest treasures, thou wilt find none equal to a virtuous conduct."

Al-Farahidi distinguished himself via his philosophical views as well. He reasoned that a man's intelligence peaked at the age of forty – the age when the Islamic prophet Muhammad began his call – and began to diminish after sixty, the point at which Muhammad died. He also believed that a person was at their peak intelligence at the clearest part of dawn.

Regarding the field of grammar, al-Farahidi held the realist views common among early Arab linguists, yet rare among both later and modern times. Rather than holding the rules of grammar as he and his students described them to be absolute rules, al-Farahidi saw the Arabic language as the natural, instinctual speaking habits of the Bedouin; if the descriptions of scholars such as himself differed from how the Arabs of the desert naturally spoke, then the cause was a lack of knowledge on the scholar's part as the unspoken, unwritten natural speech of pure Arabs was the final determiner. Al-Farahidi was distinguished, however, in his view that the Arabic alphabet included 29 letters rather than 28 and that each letter represented a fundamental characteristic of people or animals. His classification of 29 letters was due to his consideration of combining Lām and Alif as a separate third letter from the two individual parts.

== Legacy ==
In the Arab world, al-Farahidi had become a household name by the time he died and became the only protégé of Abu al-Aswad al-Du'ali in Arabic philology. He was the first to codify the complex metres of Arabic poetry and an outstanding genius of the Muslim world. Sibawayh and al-Asma'i were among his students, with the former having been more indebted to al-Farahidi than to any other teacher. Ibn al-Nadim, the 10th-century bibliophile biographer from Basra, reports that in fact Sibawayh's "Kitab" (Book) was a collaborative work of forty-two authors, but also that the principles and subjects in the "Kitab" were based on those of al-Farahidi. He is quoted by Sibawayh 608 times, more than any other authority. Throughout the Kitab, Sibawayh says "I asked him" or "he said", without naming the person referred to by the pronoun; however, it is clear that he refers to al-Farahidi. Both the latter and the former are historically the earliest and most significant figures in the formal recording of the Arabic language.

Al-Farahidi was also well versed in astronomy, mathematics, Islamic law, music theory, and Muslim prophetic tradition. His prowess in Arabic was said to be drawn, first and foremost, from his vast knowledge of Muslim prophetic tradition and exegesis of the Qur'an. The Al Khalil Bin Ahmed Al Farahidi School of Basic Education in Rustaq, Oman, is named after him.

== Works ==
=== Kitab al-'Ayn ===
Kitab al-Ayn ("The Book of Ayn") was the first dictionary written for the Arabic language. Instead of following the order of the alphabet, al-Farahidi sorted letters according to where the consonants are pronounced in the mouth, from back to front, beginning with the letter ع "ayn", representing the [ʕ] sound formed in the throat. The word ayn may also mean a water source in the desert, perhaps reflecting its author's goal to derive the etymological origins of Arabic vocabulary and lexicography.

=== Isnad of Kitab al-'Ayn ===
In his Kitab al-Fihrist (Catalogue), Ibn al-Nadim recounts the various names attached to the transmission of Kitab al-'Ayn, i.e., the isnad (chain of authorities). He begins with Durustuyah's account that al-Kasrawi said that al-Zaj al-Muhaddath had said that al-Khalil had explained the concept and structure of his dictionary to al-Layth b. al-Muzaffar b. Nasr b. Sayyar had dictated edited portions to al-Layth, and they had reviewed their preparation together. Ibn al-Nadim writes that a manuscript in the possession of Da'laj had probably belonged originally to Ibn al-'Ala al-Sijistani, who, according to Durustuyah, had been a member of a circle of scholars who critiqued the book. In this group were Abu Talib al-Mufaddal ibn Slamah, 'Abd Allah ibn Muhammad al-Karmani, Abu Bakr ibn Durayd, and al-Huna'i al-Dawsi.

=== Other works ===
In addition to his work in prosody and lexicography, al-Farahidi established the fields of ʻarūḍ – rules governing Arabic poetry metre – and Arabic musicology. Often called a genius by historians, he was a scholar, a theorist, and an original thinker. Ibn al-Nadim's list of al-Khalil's other works is:

- Chanting; Prosody; Witnesses; (Consonant) Points and (Vowel) Signs; Death (or pronunciation or omitting) of the 'Ayn; Harmony.

=== Cryptography ===
Al-Farahidi's Kitab al-Muamma "Book of Cryptographic Messages", was the first book on cryptography and cryptanalysis written by a linguist. The lost work contains many "firsts," including using permutations and combinations to list all possible Arabic words with and without vowels. Later Arab cryptographers explicitly resorted to al-Farahidi's phonological analysis to calculate letter frequency in their own works. His work on cryptography influenced al-Kindi (c. 801–873), who discovered the method of cryptanalysis by frequency analysis.

=== Diacritic system ===
Al-Farahidi is also credited with the current standard for Arabic diacritics; rather than a series of indistinguishable dots, it was al-Farahidi who introduced different shapes for the vowel diacritics in Arabic, which simplified the writing system so much that it has not been changed since. He also began using a small letter shin to signify the shadda mark for doubling consonants. Al-Farahidi's style for writing the Arabic alphabet was much less ambiguous than the previous system, where dots had to perform various functions, and while he only intended its use for poetry, it was eventually used for the Qur'an.

=== Prosody ===
Al-Farahidi's first work was studying Arabic prosody, a field for which he is credited as the founder. Reportedly, he performed the Hajj pilgrimage to Mecca while a young man and prayed to God that he would be inspired by knowledge no one else had. When he returned to Basra shortly thereafter, he overheard the rhythmic beating of a blacksmith on an anvil, and he immediately wrote down fifteen metres around the periphery of five circles, which were accepted as the basis of the field and still accepted as such in Arabic language prosody today. Three meters were unknown to Pre-Islamic Arabia, suggesting that al-Farahidi may have invented them. He never mandated, however, that all Arab poets must necessarily follow his rules without question, and even he was said to have knowingly broken the rules at times.

== Bibliography ==
- Dodge, Bayard, ed. (1970). The Fihrist of al-Nadim A Tenth-Century Survey of Muslim Culture. Vol. 1. Translated by Dodge, B. Columbia University Press. p. 95.
- Rafael Talmon. Arabic Grammar in its Formative Age: Kitāb al-‘ayn and its Attribution to Halīl b. Aḥmad, Studies in Semitic Languages and Linguistics, 25 (Leiden: Brill, 1997). Includes a thorough assessment of al-Khalil's biography.
- Abdel-Malek, Zaki N. (2019) Towards a New Theory of Arabic Prosody, 5th ed. (Revised), Posted online with free access.
