= Kitab al-'Ayn =

Early Arabic language dictionary

Kitāb al-ʿAyn
- Author: al-Khalil ibn Ahmad al-Farahidi
- Original title: كتاب العين
- Language: Arabic
- Genre: Dictionary
- Publication date: 8th century

Kitāb al-ʿAyn (Arabic: كتاب العين) is the first Arabic language dictionary and one of the earliest known dictionaries of any language. It was compiled in the eighth century by al-Khalil ibn Ahmad al-Farahidi. The letter ayn (ع) of the dictionary's title is regarded as phonetically the deepest letter in the Arabic alphabet. In addition the word ayn carries the sense of 'a water source in the desert'. Its title "the source" alludes also to the author's interest in etymology and tracing the meanings of words to their Arabic origins.

Al-Farahidi, who was from the Basra School, chose an unusual arrangement that does not follow the alphabetical order familiar today as the standard dictionary format. Al-Farahidi devised a phonetic system that followed the pattern of pronunciation of the Arabic alphabet. According to this system the order begins with the deepest letter in the throat, the letter ﻉ (ayin), and ends with the last letter pronounced by the lips, that being م (mim). Due to ayin's position as the innermost letter to emerge from the throat, he viewed its origins deep down in the throat as a sign that it was the first sound, the essential sound, the voice and a representation of the self.

The original manuscript copy by al-Farahidi is believed to have survived up until the fourteenth century when it seems to have disappeared. However summarized copies by the al-Andalus lexicologist Abu Bakr al-Zubaydi (d. 989), were circulating there by the tenth century.

== Contents ==
Al-Farahidi introduces the dictionary with an outline of the phonetics of Arabic. The format he adopted for the dictionary consisted of twenty-six books, a book for every letter, with weak letters combined as a single book; the number of chapters of each book accords with the number of radicals, with the weak radicals being listed last. According to this system roots are treated anagrammatically, and all possible anagrams of radical arrangements given. The introduction to volume I contains the phonotactic rules of the Arabic root system, where consonants are classified according to properties of vocalisation, point of articulation, and common distributional characteristics. The intention is not the production of a complete lexicon of the Arabic language, but rather a lexicon of the root system from which expands the vast, almost limitless, vocabulary of the Arabic language.

Al-Farahidi groups consonants according to their vocalisation characteristics:

- From the throat: Ayn, Hāʾ, Khāʾ, Ḥāʾ, Ghayn
- From the soft palate: Kāf, Qāf
- From the palate: Ṣād, Ḍād, Jīm
- From the teeth and tip of the tongue: Shīn, Sīn, Zāy
- From the prepalate: Ṭāʾ, Tāʾ, Dāl
- From the gums: Ẓāʾ, Thāʾ, Ḏāl
- From the apex of the tongue: Lām, Nūn, Rāʾ
- From the lips: Fāʾ, Bāʾ, Mīm
- From the palate with the emission of air: Yāʾ, Wāw, ʾAlif, Hamzah

== History ==
Al-Farahidi's manuscript, originally held in a library of the Tahirid dynasty, was returned to Basra in 862, or 863CE, seventy years after his death, when a northeast Persian bookseller sold it for fifty dinars. Some few copies were made available for commercial sale, although the work remained rare through much of the Middle Ages and despite being in circulation in al-Andalus in 914/915CE, it was not until its discovery by the Iraqi priest and friar Anastase-Marie al-Karmali in 1914 that it was reintroduced into the West. In the modern era, the book has been printed by Maktabah Al Hilal, having been reviewed by Dr. Mahdi al Makhzūmi and Dr. Ibrāhim Al Samirā'ì in eight volumes. The dictionary (alphabetically arranged) is available in Arabic in a four volume edition published in 2003 by Dār al-Kutub al-ʿIlmiyyah (دار الكتب العلمية) and available online.

All subsequent lexicographic works in Arabic are based on al-Farahidi's dictionary, and it is said that al-Farahidi's Kitāb al-ʿAyn did for lexicography what his student Sibawayh's al-Kitāb (الكتاب) did for grammar. Historically, a handful of rival Arab lexicographers questioned the attribution of the book to al-Farahidi, though modern scholarship has attributed this to jealousy in the part of later linguists who have found themselves in al-Farahidi's shadow. The work caused later controversy as well. Ibn Duraid, who wrote the second comprehensive Arabic dictionary ever, was accused by his contemporary Nifṭawayh of simply plagiarizing al-Farahidi's work.

== Methodology ==
Al-Farahidi tried to rationalize the empirical practice of lexicography in al-Ayn, explicitly referring to the calculation of arrangements and combinations in order to exhaustively enumerate all words in Arabic. According to al-Farahidi's theory, what is known as the Arabic language is merely the phonetically realized part of the entire possible language. The various combinations of roots are reckoned by al-Farahidi by the arrangement r to r with 1 < r ≤ 5, which is the possible language; the possible language, however, is limited by the rules of phonological compatibility among the phonemes of the roots. By applying this limit to the possible language, al-Farahidi theorized that the actual language could be extracted and thus the lexis of Arabic could be recorded.

Al-Farahidi began his extraction of the actual language from the possible language based on the phonological limit by calculating the nonrepetitive number of combinations of Arabic roots, taken as r to r with r = 2 - 5. He then took that along with the number of permutations for each r group; he finally calculated A^{r}_{n} = r! (^{n}_{r}) with n being the number of letters in the Semitic alphabet. Al-Farahidi's theory and calculation are now found in the writings of most lexicographers.
