= Sa'id ibn Aws al-Ansari =

Linguist and a reputable narrator of hadith

- Born: Ṣulbīyah al-Khazraj
- Died: 831 [215 A.H.]

Academic work
- Main interests: poetry, philology, fiqh (law), etc.
- Notable works: Ṭabaqāt al-Naḥwīyīn wa-al-Lughawīyīn

Abū Zayd Sa’īd ibn Aws al-Anṣārī (أبو زيد سعيد بن أوس الأنصاري; died 830 CE/215 AH) was an Arab linguist and a reputable narrator of hadith. Sibawayh and al-Jāḥiẓ were among his pupils. His father was Aws ibn Thabit also a hadith narrator, while his grandfather Thabit ibn Bashir was one of the three scribes who wrote down the Qur'an during Muhammad's era.

He died in Basra, Iraq.
