= Abu Ja'far al-Madani =

Abu Ja'far al-Madani (Arabic: أبو جعفر المدني) was a significant figure in the transmission of the Qira'at - the different linguistic, lexical, phonetic, morphological and syntactical forms permitted with reciting the Quran, having transmitted one of the Ten qira'at himself.

== Name and early life ==
Debate exists on Abu Ja'far's birth name. The majority position states that he was Yazid ibn al-Qa'qa', while others say that his name was Jundub ibn Fairuz. He was born in Medina in 655 CE.

== Qira'at ==
Abu Ja'far had his qira'a, which he transmitted on the authorities of Abu Hurayra and Ibn Abbas, on the authority of Ubayy ibn Ka'b, on the authority of the Prophet Muhammad. His qira'a has two transmitters:

- Ibn Wirdan
- Ibn Jammaz

== Hadith and fiqh ==
In contrast to his well-known qira'a, he was not a renowned transmitter of the Hadith, although Malik ibn Anas narrated from him a few times and Ibn Hatim described him as a reliable transmitter. He was also a Faqīh, issuing fatwas in Medina.

== Death ==
Abu Ja'far died in 748 CE. It is said that when ritual ghusl was performed on his body, "they looked at what's between his throat and his heart; it was like a page of the mushaf, and no one thought it wasn't the light of the Quran."
