= Warraq =

Arabic word for stationer or papermaker

Warraq (Arabic: ورّاق) is the Arabic word for stationer or papermaker. Meanings in traditional and Islamic contexts include copyist, bookseller, scholar, and author. Ibn Warraq is a pseudonym that has traditionally been adopted by dissident authors throughout the history of Islam.

In the year 987, Ibn al-Nadim al-Warraq produced al-Fihirist, a bibliographical compilation listing books available in Arabic written by 4,300 authors.
