= Tarteel =

Hymnodic recitation of the Qur'an

Tarteel (Arabic: ترتيل) is the Arabic word for hymnody. The term is commonly translated in reference to the Quran as recitation, "in proper order" and "with no haste".

== In the Quran ==
This word is used in chapter 73 named Al-Muzzammil, verse 4 of the Qur'an:

"أَوْ زِدْ عَلَيْهِ وَرَتِّلِ الْقُرْآنَ تَرْتِيلًا"
'Or add to it, and recite the Qur'an in slow, measured rhythmic tones.'

The Arabic word translated as "slow, measured rhythmic tones" is tarteel. It is also the term used to define the rules explaining proper recitation of the Quran in the manner that Jibril revealed it to Muhammad.

== Meaning and practice ==
While reciting, one has to keep in mind the fasl (division) and wasl (joining) of words and sentences. The interpretation of the above-mentioned verse according to Ibn Kathir is, "recite the Quran slowly, making the letters clear, for this is an assistance in understanding and pondering the meaning of the Quran."

The fourth caliph, Ali ibn Abi Talib, said that tarteel is delivering words according to their makharij (outlets for sound or intonations). Saying the words clearly and slowly and reciting with understanding and uttering the contents correctly is of prime importance. One should neither recite the Quran with such speed that it might become incomprehensible and bore the listener nor the recitation be so slow that it takes a long time and puts the listeners off. According to him, "Following the middle path is a virtue" or in Arabic: خير الأمور أوسطها (Khayru l-umūri awsaṭuhā).

== See also ==
- Tilawa
- Tajwid
- Qur'an reading
- Cantillation
- Al-Muzzammil
- Qira'at
- Hafiz
