= Ma'mar ibn al-Muthanna =

Persian Arab grammarian and linguist (728–825)

- Born: 728
- Died: 825
- Other name: Abu Ubayda
- Education: Pupil of Abu 'Amr ibn al-'Ala', Yunus ibn Habib and Al-Akhfash al-Akbar
- Occupation: Early Muslim scholar of Arabic philology
- Notable work: Book of Days

Ma'mar ibn al-Muthanna (728–825) also known as Abu Ubayda (Arabic: أبو عبيدة) was an early Muslim scholar of Arabic philology. He was a controversial figure; later scholar Ibn Qutayba remarked that Abu Ubayda "hated Arabs," though his contemporaries still considered him perhaps the most well-rounded scholar of his age. Whether or not Abu Ubayda was truly a follower of the Shu'ubiyya is still a matter of debate.

== Life ==
Ma'mar was originally of Persian Jewish descent. In his youth, he was a pupil of Abu 'Amr ibn al-'Ala', Yunus ibn Habib and Al-Akhfash al-Akbar, was later a contemporary of Al-Asmaʿi, and in 803 he was called to Baghdad by the Caliph Harun al-Rashid. In one incident recounted by numerous historians, the Caliph al-Rashid brought forth a horse and asked both Al-Asmaʿi and Abu 'Ubaida (who had also written extensively about zoology) to identify the correct terms for each part of the horse's anatomy. Ma'mar excused himself from the challenge, saying that he was a linguist and anthologist rather than a veterinarian; Al-Asmaʿi then leaped onto the horse, identified every part of its body and gave examples from Bedouin Arab poetry establishing the terms as proper Arabic vocabulary. Among his students was the noted musician Ishaq al-Mawsili.

He was one of the most learned and authoritative scholars of his time in all matters pertaining to the Arabic language, antiquities and stories, and is constantly cited by later authors and compilers. Al-Jahiz held him to be the most learned scholar in all branches of human knowledge, and Ibn Hisham accepted his interpretation even of passages in the Qur'an. Although Ma'mar couldn't recite a single verse of the Qur'an without committing errors in pronunciation, he was considered an expert on the linguistic meanings of the verses, especially in regard to rarely used vocabulary. The titles of 105 of his works are mentioned in the Fihrist of Ibn al-Nadim, and his Book of Days is the basis of parts of the history of Ibn al-Athir and of the Kitab al-Aghani of Abu al-Faraj al-Isfahani, but nothing of his (except a song) seems to exist now in an independent form.

He died in Basra in 825.

== Legacy ==
The exact nature of Ma'mar's religious and ethnocentric views is a matter of debate. H. A. R. Gibb holds that prior to Ibn Qutaybah's accusation centuries later, none had accused Abu Ubaida of prejudice against Arabs; rather, Gibb holds that this was as a result of his status as a Kharijite, a medieval sect of Muslims different from both Sunnis and Shi'as. Hugh Chisholm disagrees, holding that Abu Ubaida was neither a Kharijite nor a racist but simply a supporter of Shu'ubiyya and opposed the idea that Arabs were inherently superior to other races. In Chisolm's description, he delighted in showing that words, fables, customs, etc., which the Arabs believed to be peculiarly their own, were derived from the Persians. In these matters he was the great rival of al-Asma’i. Ma'mar's views differed sharply in regard to Arabic and the Qur'an; he denied that the Qur'an contained any non-Arabic vocabulary, a position to which later commentators such as Al-Suyuti were opposed.

Regardless of any controversy, Ma'mar's influence is well known. Almost half of all information about Arabia before Islam reported by later authors was by way of Ma'mar, and he wrote the earliest extant Tafsir or commentary on the Qur'an, which was the basis for explaining any verses in the prophetic biography written by Ibn Hisham.
