= Umar Rida Kahhala =

Syrian historian and writer (1905 - 1987)

Umar Rida Kahhalah عمر رضا كحالة
- Born: عمر رضا كحالة; 1905; Damascus, Ottoman Empire
- Died: 1987 (aged 81–82); Damascus
- Years active: 1905-1987

Umar Rida Kahhalah (Arabic: عمر رضا كحالة (1905 - 1987)) was a historian, scholar, and writer from Damascus, Syria. He published many important works on Arabic history, as well as indices of biographies of Arab scholars and intellectuals.

== Published works ==
- Mu'jam al-Mu'allifin, vol. 4, Damascus, 1961 [1957] - (معجم المؤلفين) 4 volumes, bibliographic-biographical dictionary; "indispensable reference work for Arabic scholars and librarians."
- A'lām al-Nisā', Damascus: Al-Hashimi Press, 1959

== Bibliography ==
- Farrāj, ʻAṭā Sālim (2008) [1998], Kashshāf Muʻjam al-muʼallifīn li-Kaḥḥālah, Maktabat al-Malik Fahd al-Waṭanīyah;On ʻUmar Riḍā Kaḥḥālah's Muʻjam al-muʼallifīn.
