= Ibn Abi Ishaq =

Yemeni Arabic language grammarian (died 735 CE)

- عبد الله بن أبي إسحاق
- Born: c. 650 CE (c. 29 AH); Basra, Rashidun Caliphate
- Died: 735 CE (117 AH); Basra, Umayyad Caliphate

Academic work
- Era: Islamic Golden Age
- Region: Basra, Iraq
- School or tradition: Basran school
- Main interests: Arabic grammar, Arabic phonology, linguistic analogy (Qiyas)
- Notable ideas: Pioneer of prescriptive Arabic grammar, early application of Qiyas (analogical reasoning) in linguistics

ʿAbd-Allāh ibn Abī Isḥāq al-Ḥaḍramī (Arabic, عَبْدُ اللّهِ بْنُ أَبِي إِسْحَاقَ الْحَضْرَمِيُّ), (born AD 650 / AH 29 - died AD 735 / AH 117) was an Arab from Yemen and is considered the first grammarian of the Arabic language. He compiled a prescriptive grammar by referring to the usage of the Bedouins, whose language was seen as especially pure (see also iʿrāb, aʿrāb). He is also considered the first person to use linguistic analogy in Arabic.

Two students of Ibn Abi Ishaq's were Harun ibn Musa and Abu 'Amr ibn al-'Ala'. His student al-Thaqafi seems to have had more prescriptive views while al-'Ala's were more descriptive. Their differences have been suggested to lie at the core of the late division of Arabic grammar into the schools of Kufa and Basra. Ibn Abi Ishaq was said to be more proficient with the rules of grammar than the analysis of common speech.

Abi Ishaq's work was considered influential upon later grammarians, as he was quoted as an authority by Sibawayh in his seminal work on Arabic grammar seven times.

== See also ==
- List of Arab scientists and scholars
