= Michael G. Carter =

British literary scholar

- Born: 1939 (age 86–87)

Academic background
- Thesis: A Study of Sibawaihi's Principles of Grammatical Analysis (1968)

Academic work
- Discipline: literary scholar
- Institutions: Oslo University

Michael George Carter (born 1939) is a British Islamic studies scholar, Emeritus Professor of Arabic at the University of Oslo and Honorary Professor in the Centre for Medieval Studies in Sydney University. He is known for his works on Arabic linguistics. A festschrift in his honor was published in 2006. He is a winner of King Faisal Prize.

== Books ==
- Sibawayhi (Makers of Islamic Civilisation)
- A History of the Arabic Language
- Modern Written Arabic: A Comprehensive Grammar
- Sibawayhi's Principles: Arabic Grammar and Law in Early Islamic Thought (Resources in Arabic and Islamic Studies)
