= Abu Amr al-Basri =

8th-century Qur'anic Scholar and Arab linguist

Abu Amr bin al-Ala
- أبو عمرو بن العلاء

Personal life
- Born: c. 70 AH (689/690 CE) Mecca
- Died: 154 AH (770/771 CE) Kufa
- Main interest(s): Arabic, Quran

Religious life
- Religion: Islam

Muslim leader
- Influenced by: Ibn Abi Ishaq
- Influenced: Sibawayh, Yunus ibn Habib, Al-Asmaʿi, Harun ibn Musa, Ibn Mujahid, Al-Khalil ibn Ahmad al-Farahidi

Abu ʻAmr bin al-ʻAlāʼ al-Basri (Arabic: أبو عمرو بن العلاء; (689/90-770/71; c.70-154 AH) was the Qur'an reciter of Basra, Iraq and an Arab linguist.

He was born in Mecca. Descended from a branch of the Banu Tamim, Ibn al-ʻAlāʼ is one of the seven primary transmitters of the chain of narration for the Qur'an. He founded the Basran philology school of Arabic grammar. He was as well known as a grammarian as he was a reader, though his reading style was influenced by those of Nafi‘ al-Madani and Ibn Kathir al-Makki. In between his study of Qur'an reading in his hometown of Mecca and in Basra, he also travelled to learn more about the practice in the Kufan school and in Medina.

Ibn al-ʻAlāʼ studied under Ibn Abi Ishaq and among his own pupils were Al-Khalil ibn Ahmad al-Farahidi, Yunus ibn Habib, Al-Asma'i and Harun ibn Musa. Al-Asma'i related that Ibn al-ʻAlāʼ was asked a thousand grammatical questions, and answered each with an example. Another student of his was Abu ʿUbaidah, who called Ibn al-ʻAlāʼ the most learned of all men in philology, grammar, Arabic poetry and the Qur'an. Although he never met Sibawayhi, the ethnic Persian , Sibawayhi quotes from Abu Amr 57 times in his Kitab, mostly by transmission from Ibn Habib and al-Farahidi.

The Qur'an reciter Al-Duri was the student of al-Yazīdī, who was Ibn al-ʻAlāʼs student, and preserved his recitation, passing on his method to Niftawayh and Muhammad bin Dawud al-Zahiri. Ibn al-ʻAlāʼ was a contemporary of many early Muslim notables; he remarked that in his experience, Hasan al-Basri and Al-Hajjaj ibn Yusuf were the first and second most eloquent and pure speakers of the Arabic language. On his return from a visit to the governor of Syria, Ibn al-ʻAlāʼ experienced a series of fainting fits and died in Kufa in 770CE (154AH). He was buried in that city.
