= Sibawayh =

Persian grammarian from Basra (c.760–796)

Sybawayh سيبويه
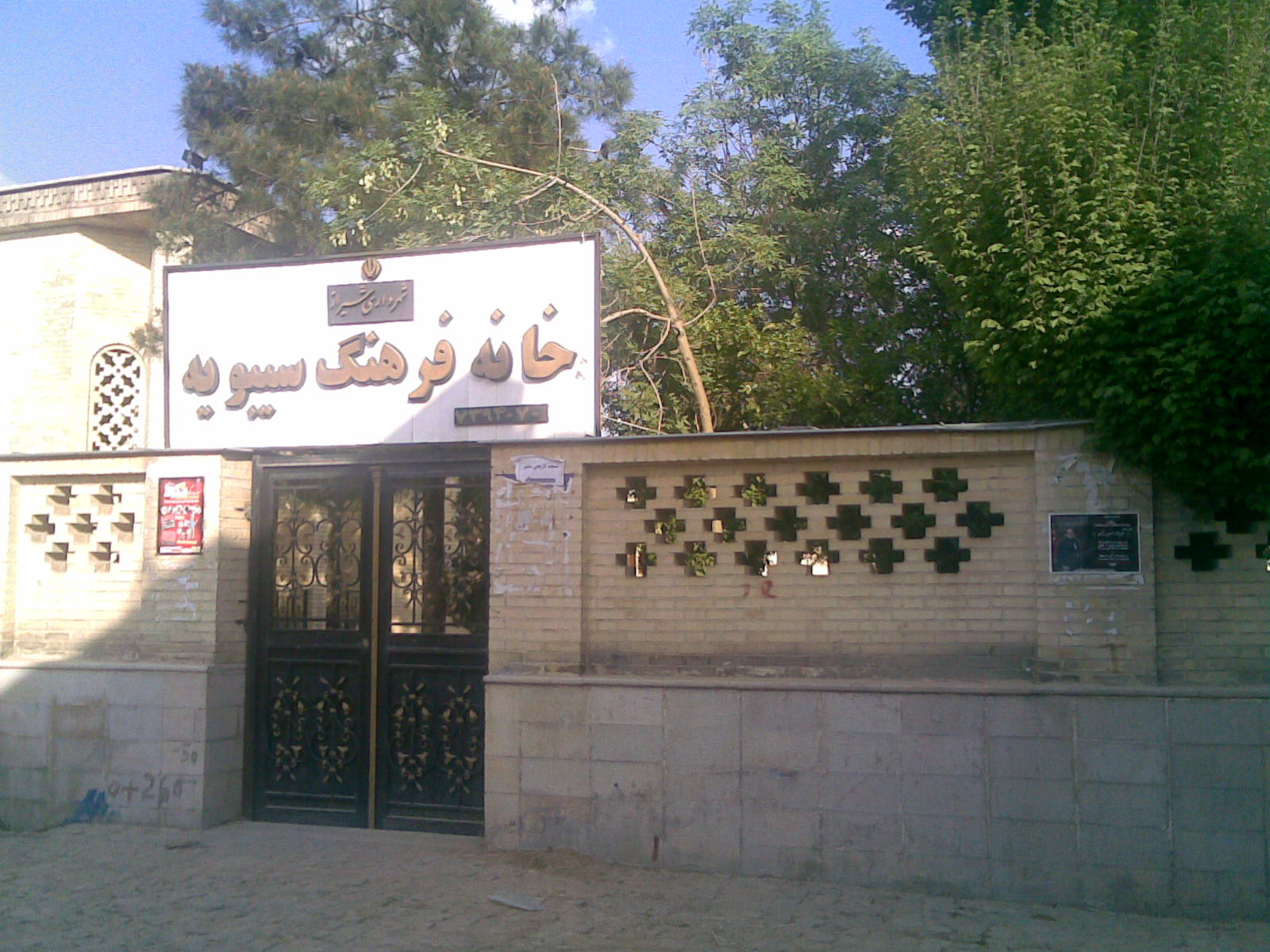
- Entrance to Sybawayh's tomb in Shiraz
- Born: c. 760, Shiraz, Persia, Abbasid Caliphate
- Died: c. 796, Shiraz, Persia or Basra, Iraq, Abbasid Caliphate

Philosophical work
- Era: Medieval philosophy
- Region: Islamic philosophy
- Main interests: Arabic and Persian

Sibawayh (Arabic: سِيبَوَيْه IPA: [siːbæˈwæjh] (also pronounced [siːbæˈweː(h)] in many modern dialects) Sībawayh; Persian: سیبُویه (Classical Persian: Sēbūya [seːbuːˈja], modern Iranian Persian Sībūye [siːbuːˈje]); c. 760–796), whose full name is Abu Bishr Amr ibn Uthman ibn Qanbar al-Basri (أَبُو بِشْر عَمْرو بْن عُثْمَان بْن قَنْبَر ٱلْبَصْرِيّ, ʾAbū Bišr ʿAmr ibn ʿUṯmān ibn Qanbar al-Baṣrī), was a Persian leading grammarian of Basra and author of the Third book on Arabic grammar. His famous unnamed work, referred to as Al-Kitāb, or "The Book", is a five-volume seminal discussion of the Arabic language.

Ibn Qutaybah, the earliest extant source, in his biographical entry under Sibawayh simply wrote:

He is Amr ibn Uthman, and he was mainly a grammarian. He arrived in Baghdad, fell out with the local grammarians, was humiliated, went back to some town in Persia, and died there while still a young man.

The tenth-century biographers Ibn al-Nadim and Abu Bakr al-Zubaydi, and in the 13th-century Ibn Khallikan, attribute Sibawayh with contributions to the science of the Arabic language and linguistics that were unsurpassed by those of earlier and later times. He has been called the greatest of all Arabic linguists and one of the greatest linguists of all time in any language.

== Biography ==
Born between 755 AD and 766 AD, Sibawayh was from Shiraz, in today's Fars province, Iran. (Note: Versteegh gives Sibawayh's birth-place as Hamadan in Western Iran, however neither Ibn Nadim nor Ibn Khallikan, whose work seems based on the former's, mention his place of birth, and merely state he was Persian. Only Al-Zubaydī reports an akhbar (tradition) from Abū 'Alī al-Baghdadī that Sibawayh was born in a village near Shiraz.) Reports vary, some saying he went first to Basra, then to Baghdad, and finally back to the village of al-Baida near Shiraz where he died between 177/793 and 180/796, while another says he died in Basra in 161/777. His Persian nickname Sibuyeh, arabized as Sībawayh(i), means "scent of apples" coming from the Persian root word sib meaning apple and reportedly refers to his "sweet breath." A protégé of the Banu Harith b. Ka'b b. 'Amr b. 'Ulah b. Khalid b. Malik b. Udad, he learned the dialects (languages) from Abu al-Khattab al-Akhfash al-Akbar (the Elder) and others. He came to Iraq in the days of Harun al-Rashid when he was thirty-two years old and died in Persia when he was over forty. He was a student of the two eminent grammarians Yunus ibn Habib and Al-Khalil ibn Ahmad al-Farahidi, the latter of whom he was most indebted.

== Debates ==
Despite Sibawayh's renowned scholarship, his status as a non-native speaker of the language is a central feature in the many anecdotes included in the biographies. The accounts throw useful light on early contemporary debates which influenced the formulation of the fundamental principles of Arabic grammar.

=== The Question of the Hornet ===
In a story from the debate held by the Abbasid vizier Yahya ibn Khalid of Baghdad on standard Arabic usage, Sibawayh, representing the Basra school of grammar, and al-Kisa'i, one of the canonical Quran readers and the leading figure in the rival school of Kufa, had a dispute on the following point of grammar, which later became known as المسألة الزنبورية al-Mas’alah al-Zunbūrīyah ("The Question of the Hornet").

The discussion involved the final clause of the sentence:

Arabic: كُنْتُ أَظُنُّ أَنَّ ٱلْعَقْرَبَ أَشَدُّ لَسْعَةً مِنَ الزُّنْبُورِ، فَإِذَا هُوَ إِيَّاهَا.
kuntu ʾaẓunnu ʾanna l-ʿaqraba ʾašaddu lasʿatan min az-zunbūri, fa-ʾiḏā huwa ʾiyyā-hā.
"I have always thought that the scorpion was more painful in stinging than the hornet, and sure enough it is."

Both Sibawayh and al-Kisa'i agreed that it involved an omitted verb, but disagreed on the specific construct to be used.

Sibawayh proposed finishing it with fa-'iḏā huwa hiya (فإذا هو هي), literally "and-thus he [is] she", using "he" for the scorpion (a masculine noun in Arabic) and "she" for "stinging, bite" (a feminine noun), arguing that Arabic does not need or use any verb-form like is in the present tense, and that object forms like ('iyyā-)hā are never the main part of a predicate.

Al-Kisa'i argued for fa-'iḏā huwa 'iyyā-hā (فإذا هو إياها), literally "and-thus he [does] onto-her", supporting the object pronoun -hā ("her") with the particle 'iyyā-. He believed that both hiya and ‘iyyā-hā were correct. The grammatical constructions of the debate may be compared to a similar point in the grammar of modern English: "it is she" vs. "it is her", which is still a point of some disagreement today.

To Sibawayh's dismay, al-Kisa'i soon ushered in four Bedouins who had "happened" to be waiting near the door. Each testified that huwa 'iyyā-hā was also proper usage and so Sibawayh's was judged incorrect. After this, he left the court, and was said to have returned in indignation to Shiraz where he died soon, apparently either from upset or illness.

A student of Sibawayh's, al-Akhfash al-Asghar (Akhfash the Younger), is said to have challenged al-Kisa'i after his teacher's death asking him 100 questions on grammar, proving al-Kisa'i's answers wrong each time. When the student revealed who he was and what had happened, al-Kisa'i approached the Caliph Harun al-Rashid and requested punishment from him knowing he had had a share in "killing Sibawayh."

== Legacy ==
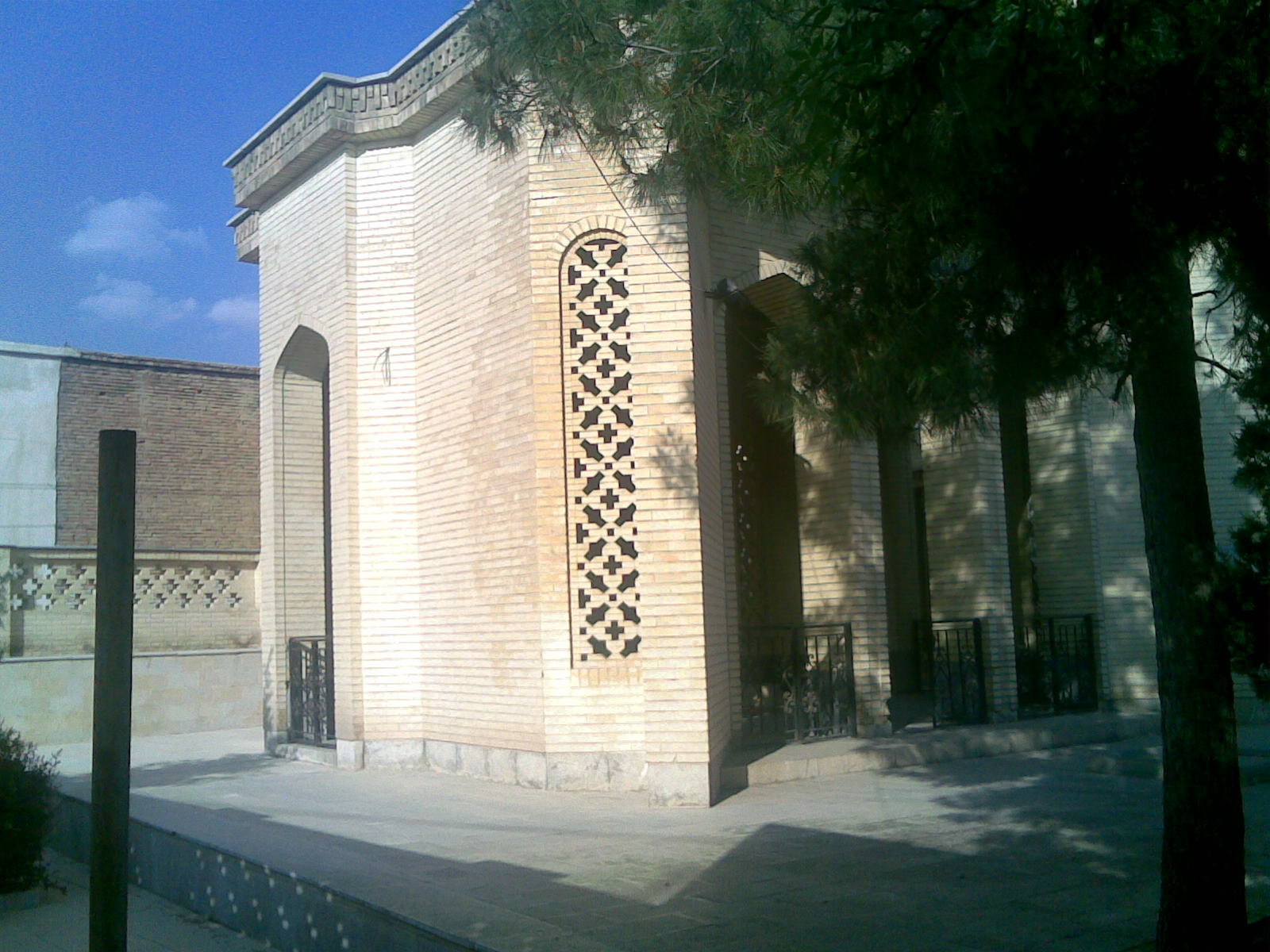
Sibawayh's tomb in Shiraz.

Sibawayh's Al-Kitab was the first formal and analytical Arabic grammar written by a non-native speaker of Arabic, i.e. as a foreign language. His application of logic to the structural mechanics of language was wholly innovative for its time. Both Sibawayh and his teacher al-Farahidi are historically the earliest and most significant figures in respect to the formal recording of the Arabic language. Much of the impetus for this work came from the desire of non-Arab Muslims for correct interpretation of the Quran and the development of tafsir (Quranic exegesis); The poetic language of the Qur'an presents interpretative challenges even to the native Arabic speaker. In Arabic, the final voiced vowel may occasionally be omitted, as in the Arabic pronunciation of the name Sibawayh where the name terminates as Sibuyeh. Discrepancies in pronunciation may occur where a text is read aloud (See harakat); these pronunciation variants pose particular issues for religious readings of Qur'anic scripture where correct pronunciation, or reading, of God's Word is sacrosanct.

Later scholars of Arabic grammar came to be compared to Sibawayh. The name Niftawayh, a combination of "nift", or asphalt – due to his dark complexion – and "wayh", was given to him out of his love of Sibawayh's works. Abu Turab al-Zahiri was referred to as the Sibawayh of the modern era due to the fact that, although he was of Arab descent, Arabic was not his mother tongue.

=== Al-Kitāb ===
Al-Kitāb (Note: Al-Nadim claims to have seen notes about grammar and language in Sibawayh's handwriting in the library of a book collector, Muhammad ibn al-Husayn (Abu Ba'rah), in the city of al-Hadithah – he may have been referring to a city near Mosul or a town on the Euphrates.) or Kitāb Sībawayh ('Book of Sibawayh'), is the foundational grammar of the Arabic language, and perhaps the first Arabic prose text. Al-Nadim describes the voluminous work, reputedly the collaboration of forty-two grammarians, as "unequaled before his time and unrivaled afterwards". Sibawayh was the first to produce a comprehensive encyclopedic Arabic grammar, in which he sets down the principles rules of grammar, the grammatical categories with countless examples taken from Arabic sayings, verse and poetry, as transmitted by Al-Khalil ibn Ahmad al-Farahidi, his master and the famous author of the first Arabic dictionary, "Kitab al-'Ayn", and of many philological works on lexicography, diacritics, poetic meter (ʻarūḍ), cryptology, etc. Sibawayh's book came from flourishing literary, philological and tafsir (Quranic exegetical) tradition that centred in the schools of Basra, Kufa and later at the Abbasid caliphal seat of Baghdad. Al-Farahidi is referenced throughout Al-Kitāb always in the third person, in phrases such as "I asked him", or "he said". Sibawayh transmits quotes, mainly via Ibn Habib and al-Farahidi, of Abu ʻAmr ibn al-ʻAlāʼ 57 times, whom he never met. Sibawayh quotes his teacher Harun ibn Musa just five times.

==== Grammarians of Basra ====
Probably due to Sibawayh's early death, "no one", al-Nadim records, "was known to have studied Al-Kitāb with Sibawayh," nor did he expound it as was the tradition. Sibawayh's associate and pupil, Al-Akhfash al-Akbar, or al-Akhfash al-Mujashi'i, a learned grammarian of Basra of the Banu Mujashi ibn Darim, transcribed Sibawayh's Al-Kitāb into manuscript form. Al-Akhfash studied Al-Kitāb with a group of student and grammarian associates including Abu 'Umar al-Jarmi and Abu 'Uthman al-Mazini, who circulated Sibawayh's work, and developed the science of grammar, writing many books of their own and commentaries, such as al-Jarmi's "(Commentary on) The Strange in Sibawayh". Of the next generation of grammarians, Al-Mubarrad developed the work of his masters and wrote an Introduction to Sibawayh, Thorough Searching (or Meaning) of "the Book" of Sibawayh, and Refutation of Sibawayh. Al-Mubarrad is quoted as posing the question to anyone preparing to read the Book,

"Have you ridden through grammar, appreciating its vastness and meeting with the difficulties of its contents?"

Al-Mabriman of al-'Askar Mukram and Abu Hashim debated educational approaches to the exposition of Al-Kitāb. Among Al-Mabriman's books of grammar was An Explanation of "the Book" of Sibawayh (incomplete). Al-Mubarrad's pupil and tutor to the children of the Caliph al-Mu'tadid, Ibn as-Sarī az-Zajjāj wrote a Commentary on the Verses of Sibawayh, focusing on Sibawayh's use of both pre- and post-Islamic poetry. Al-Zajjaj's pupil, Abu Bakr ibn al-Sarraj, also wrote a Commentary on Sibawayh. In an anecdote about Ibn al-Sarraj being reprimanded for an error, he is said to have replied "you have trained me, but I've been neglecting what I studied while reading this book (meaning Sibawayh's Al-Kitāb), because I've been diverted by logic and music, and now I'm going back to [Sibawayh and grammar]", after which he became the leading grammarian after al-Zajjaj, and wrote many books of scholarship. Ibn Durustuyah an associate and pupil of al-Mubarrad and Tha'lab wrote The Triumph of Sibawayh over All the Grammarians, comprising a number of sections but left unfinished. Al-Rummani also wrote a Commentary on Sibawayh. Al-Maraghi a pupil of al-Zajjaj, wrote "Exposition and Interpretation of the Arguments of Sibawayh".

==== Format ====
Al-Kitāb, comprising 5 volumes, is a long and highly analytic and comprehensive treatment of grammar and remains largely untranslated into English. Due to its great unwieldiness and complexity the later grammarians produced concise grammars in a simple descriptive format suitable for general readership and educational purposes. Al-Kitāb categorizes grammar under subheadings, from syntax to morphology, and includes an appendix on phonetics. Each chapter introduces a concept with its definition. Arabic verbs may indicate three tenses (past, present, future) but take just two forms, defined as "past" (past tense) and "resembling" (present and future tenses).

Sibawayh generally illustrates his statements and rules by quoting verses of poetry, grabbing material from a very wide range of sources, both old and contemporary, both urban and from the desert: his sources range from pre-Islamic Arabian poets, to later Bedouin poets, urban Umayyad-era poets, and even the less prestigious and more innovative rajaz poets of his time.

Although a grammar book, Sibawayh extends his theme into phonology, standardised pronunciation of the alphabet and prohibited deviations. He dispenses with the letter-groups classification of al-Farahidi's dictionary. He introduces a discussion on the nature of morality of speech; that speech as a form of human behavior is governed by ethics, right and wrong, correct and incorrect.

Many linguists and scholars highly esteem Al-Kitāb as the most comprehensive and oldest extant Arabic grammar. Abu Hayyan al-Gharnati, the most eminent grammarian of his era, memorized the entire Al-Kitāb, and equated its value to grammar as that of hadiths to Islamic law.

== See also ==
- Abu al-Aswad al-Du'ali
- Arabic grammar

== Bibliography ==
- Dodge, Bayard, ed. (1970), The Fihrist of al-Nadim A Tenth Century Survey of Muslim Culture, vol. 2, translated by Dodge, B, New York & London: Columbia University Press
- Brustad, Kristen, 'The Iconic Síbawayh', in Essays in Islamic Phililogy, History, and Philosophy, ed. by Alireza Korangy and others, Studies in the History and Culture of the Middle East, 31 (Berlin: De Gruyter, 2016), pp. 141–65 ISBN 9783110313727
- Carter, Michael G., Síbawayhi (London: Tauris, 2004)
- Khallikan (Ibn) (1843), Ibn Khallikan's Biographical, vol. 2, translated by MacGuckin de Slane, William, London: W.H. Allen, pp. 396–9
- de Sacy, Silvestre. Anthologie grammaticale arabe. Paris 1829.
- Derenbourg, H. (ed.) Le livre de Sibawaihi. 2 vols. Paris 1881–1889. [reprinted: New York: Hildesheim 1970].
- Jahn, Gustav. Sībawaihis Buch über die Grammatik übersetzt und erklärt. Berlin 1895–1900. [reprinted: Hildesheim 1969].
- Schaade, A. Sībawaihi’s Lautlehre. Leiden 1911.
- ʻAbd al-Salām Hārūn, M. (ed.) Kitāb Sibawayhi. 5 vols. Cairo 1966–1977.
- Owens, J. The Foundations of Grammar: An introduction to Medieval Arabic Grammatical Theory. Amsterdam and Philadelphia: John Benjamins Publishing Company 1988. ISBN 90-272-4528-2.
- Al-Nassir, A.A. Sibawayh the Phonologist.London and New York: Keegan Paul International 1993. ISBN 0-7103-0356-4.
- Edzard, L. "Sibawayhi's Observations on Assimilatory Processes and Re-Syllabification in the Light of Optimality Theory", in: Journal of Arabic and Islamic Studies, vol. 3 (2000), pp. 48–65. (PDF version – No longer available; HTML version; HTML Unicode version)
- Zubaydī (al-), Abū Bakr Muḥammad ibn al-Ḥasan (1984) [1954]. "§6 (#22)". In Ibrāhīm, Muḥammad (ed.). Ṭabaqāt al-Naḥwīyīn wa-al-Lughawīyīn (in Arabic). Cairo: Al-Khanjī. pp. 66–72.
