= Harun ibn Musa =

Scholar of the Arabic language and Islamic studies (died 786)

Abu Abdullah Harun ibn Musa al-'Ataki al-A'war (d. 170AH/786AD) was an early convert from Judaism to Islam and a scholar of the Arabic language and Islamic studies. He converted while living among the Azd tribe, and was later attributed to the tribe. He was affiliated with the Basran school of Arabic grammar. A specialist in lexicography, al-A'war contributed significantly to the study of Qira'at, or variant readings of the Qur'an, and is the first formal compiler of the different recitation styles. His most active period, during which his work was marked by new developments in lexicographical studies concerning the Qur'an, was from 752 until his death.

Ibn Musa was also one of the seven teachers of Sibawayh, the ethnically Persian father of Arabic grammar, though like other Qur'an readers he was quoted by Sibawayhi less frequently than pure grammarians, with only five quotes in the infamous Kitab. Additionally, he was a student of Ibn Abi Ishaq and Abu 'Amr ibn al-'Ala'.

== Bibliography ==
- Nāṣir ibn Muḥammad Mani', Hārūn ibn Mūsá al-A‘war, manzilatuhu wa-āthāruhu fī ‘ilm al-qirā’āt. Riyadh: Dār Kunūz Ishbīlyā lil-Nashr wa-al-Tawzī‘, 2008. 1st ed. ISBN 978-603-8001-02-8

== See also ==
- List of converts to Islam
