= Yunus ibn Habib =

8th-century AD Iranian poet and linguist

- أبو عبد الرحمن يونس بن حبيب الضبي
- Born: Abu Abd al-Rahman Yunus ibn Habib al-Dabi
- Died: After 183 AH/798 AD[^1^][1]
- Occupation: Linguist
- Known for: Arabic language, literary criticism, poetry
- Notable work: Kitāb maʻānī al-Qurʼān (كتاب معاني القرآن); Kitāb al-lughāt (كتاب اللغات); Kitāb al-nawādir al-kabīr (كتاب النوادر الكبير); Kitāb al-nawādir al-ṣaghīr (كتاب النوادر الصغير); Kitāb al-amthāl (كتاب الأمثال)

Yunus ibn Habib (Arabic: أبو عبد الرحمن يونس بن حبيب الضبي; died after 183 AH/798 AD) was a reputable 8th-century, writer and poet, Persian linguist of the Arabic language. An early literary critic and expert on poetry, Ibn Habib's criticisms of poetry were known, along with those of contemporaries such as Al-Asma'i, as a litmus test for measuring later writers' eloquence.

Ibn Habib's exact tribal last name, date of birth and age at death have been an issue of contention. Medieval historian Ibn Khallikan mentions three possible tribes that he belonged to, two possible dates of birth and two possible ages at the time of his death. He never married nor did he ever take a mistress, having devoted all of his life to either studying or teaching.

His notable teachers include: Hammad ibn Salamah from whom he took knowledge in Arabic grammar, Al-Akhfash al-Akbar and Abu 'Amr ibn al-'Ala'. His students include Sibawayh, Al-Kisa'i, Yaḥyá ibn Ziyād al-Farrāʼ and Abu ʿUbaidah. Abu Ubaida once remarked that he attended the lessons of Ibn Habib every day for forty years, and every day he left with pages of notes copied from what Ibn Habib dictated from memory.

Sibawayhi, considered the father of Arabic grammar despite being Persian, quoted Ibn Habib 217 times in his famous Kitab, Ibn Habib is one of two figures (the other being Al-Khalil ibn Ahmad al-Farahidi) regarded as Sibawayhi's formative teachers.

== Works ==
List of known works by Yunus ibn Habib:

- Kitāb maʻānī al-Qurʼān (كتاب معاني القرآن)
- Kitāb al-lughāt (كتاب اللغات)
- Kitāb al-nawādir al-kabīr (كتاب النوادر الكبير)
- Kitāb al-nawādir al-ṣaghīr (كتاب النوادر الصغير)
- Kitāb al-amthāl (كتاب الأمثال)
