= Al-Fihrist =

Compendium of knowledge and literature of tenth century islam

Kitāb al-Fihrist
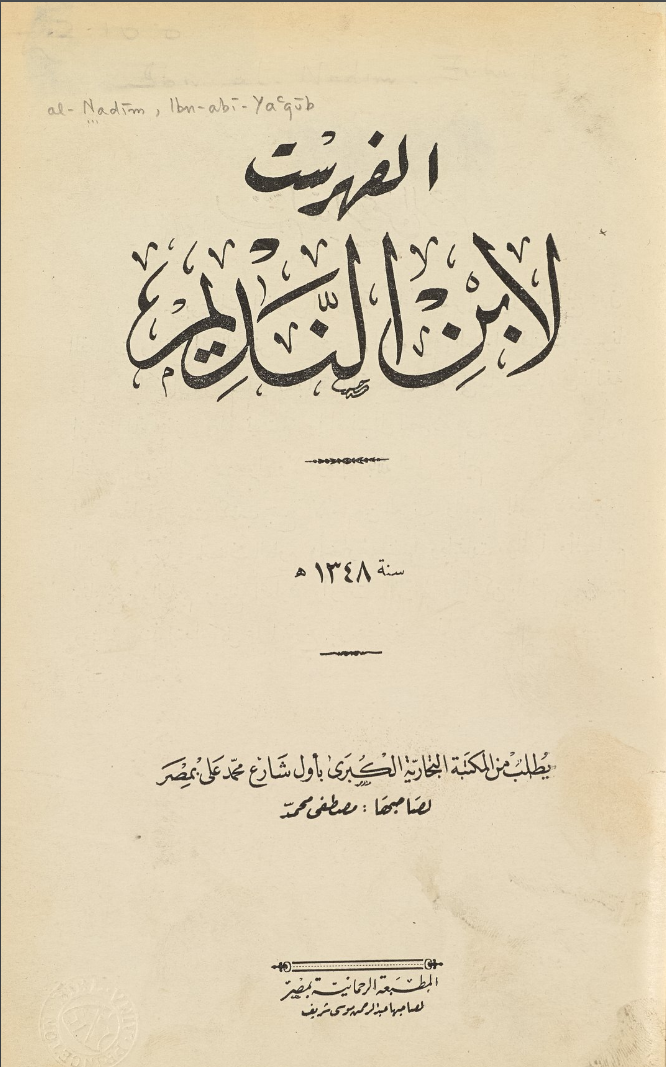
- Author: Ibn al-Nadim
- Original title: كتاب الفهرست
- Language: Arabic
- Publication date: 987

The Kitāb al-Fihrist (Arabic: كتاب الفهرست) (The Book Catalogue) is a compendium of the knowledge and literature of tenth-century Islam compiled by Ibn al-Nadim (d. 998). It references approx. 10,000 books and 3,500 to 3,700 authors, despite being incomplete. A crucial source of medieval Arabic-Islamic literature, it preserves the names of authors, books and accounts otherwise entirely lost. Al-Fihrist is evidence of Ibn al-Nadim's thirst for knowledge among the sophisticated milieu of Baghdad's intellectual elite. As a record of civilisation transmitted through Muslim culture to the Western world, it provides unique classical material and links to other civilisations.

== Content ==
The Fihrist indexes authors, together with biographical details and literary criticism. Ibn al-Nadim's interest ranges from religions, customs, sciences, with obscure facets of medieval Islamic history, works on superstition, magic, drama, poetry, satire and music from Persia, Babylonia, and Byzantium. The mundane, the bizarre, the prosaic and the profane. Ibn al-Nadim freely selected and catalogued the rich culture of his time from various collections and libraries. The order is primarily chronological and works are listed according to four internal orders: genre; orfann (chapter); maqala (discourse); the Fihrist (the book as a whole). These four chronological principles of its underlying system help researchers to interpret the work, retrieve elusive information and understand Ibn al-Nadim's method of composition, ideology, and historical analyses.

The Fihrist shows the wealth, range and breadth of historical and geographical knowledge disseminated in the literature of the Islamic Golden Age, from the modern to the ancient civilisations of Syria, Greece, India, Rome and Persia. Little survives of the Persian books listed by Ibn al-Nadim.

The author's aim, set out in his preface, is to index all books in Arabic, written by Arabs and others, as well as their scripts, dealing with various sciences, with accounts of those who composed them and the categories of their authors, together with their relationships, their times of birth, length of life, and times of death, the localities of their cities, their virtues and faults, from the beginning of the formation of science to this our own time (377 /987). An index as a literary form had existed as tabaqat – biographies. Contemporaneously in the western part of the empire in the Umayyad seat of Córdoba, the Andalusian scholar Abū Bakr al-Zubaydī, produced Ṭabaqāt al-Naḥwīyīn wa-al-Lughawīyīn (‘Categories of Grammarians and Linguists’) a biographic encyclopedia of early Arab philologists of the Basran, Kufan and Baghdad schools of Arabic grammar and tafsir (Quranic exegesis), which covers much of the same material covered in chapter II of the Fihrist.

== Editions and chapters ==
The Fihrist, written in 987, exists in two manuscript traditions, or "editions": the more complete edition contains ten maqalat ("discourses" - Devin J. Stewart chose to define maqalat as Book when considering the structure of Ibn al-Nadim's work). The first six are detailed bibliographies of books on Islamic subjects:

- Chapter 1 Quran
  - 1.1 Language and Calligraphy
  - 1.2 The Torah, the Gospel
  - 1.3 The Quran
- Chapter 2 Grammar
  - 2.1 Grammarians of al-Baṣrah
  - 2.1 Grammarians of al-Kūfah
  - 2.3 Grammarians of Both Schools
- Chapter 3 Hadīth
  - 3.1 Historians and Genealogists
  - 3.2 Official Government Authors
  - 3.3 Court Companions, Singers, and Jesters
- Chapter 4 Poetry
  - 4.1 Pre-Islāmic and Umayyad-Era Poets
  - 4.2 'Abbāsid-Era Poets
- Chapter 5 Theology & Dogma
  - 5.1 Muslim Sects; the Mu'tazilah
  - 5.2 The Shī'ah, Imāmīyah, and Zaydīyah
  - 5.3 The Mujbirah (Determinists) and al-Ḥashawīyah (Traditionalists)
  - 5.4 The Khawārij
  - 5.5 Ascetics
- Chapter 6 Law
  - 6.1 Mālik ibn Anas
  - 6.2 Abū Hanīfa
  - 6.3 al-Shāfi'i
  - 6.4 Dāwūd ibn 'Alī
  - 6.5 Legal Authorities (Shī'a and Ismā'īlīyah)
  - 6.6 Jurists of Ḥadīth
  - 6.7 al-Ṭabarī
  - 6.8 Jurists of Shurāt
- Chapter 7 Philosophy and Ancient Sciences
  - 7.1 Philosophy; Greek philosophers, al-Kindī et al.
  - 7.2 Mathematics and Astronomy
  - 7.3 Medicine; Greek and Islāmic
- Chapter 8 Entertainment Literature
  - 8.1 Storytellers and Legends,
  - 8.2 Exorcists, Jugglers, Conjurers and Magicians
  - 8.3 Fables and Other Topics
- Chapter 9 Religious Doctrines
  - 9.1 The Ṣābians, (Manichaeans, Dayṣānīyah, Khurramīyah, Marcionites, and Other Sects)
  - 9.2 Doctrines (Maqalat) of Hindus, Buddhists and the Chinese);
- Chapter 10 Alchemy.

Ibn al-Nadim claims he has seen every work listed or relies upon creditable sources.

The shorter edition contains (besides the preface and the first section of the first discourse on the scripts and the different alphabets) only the last four discourses, in other words, the Arabic translations from Greek, Syriac and other languages, together with Arabic books composed on the model of these translations. Perhaps it was the first draft and the longer edition (which is the one that is generally printed) was an extension.

Ibn al-Nadim often mentions the size and number of pages of a book, to avoid copyists cheating buyers by passing off shorter versions. Cf. Stichometry of Nicephorus. He refers to copies by famous calligraphers, to bibliophiles and libraries, and speaks of a book auction and of the trade in books. In the opening section, he deals with the alphabets of 14 peoples and their manner of writing and also with the writing-pen, paper and its different varieties. His discourses contain sections on the origins of philosophy, on the lives of Plato and Aristotle, the origin of One Thousand and One Nights, thoughts on the pyramids, his opinions on magic, sorcery, superstition, and alchemy etc. The chapter devoted to what the author rather dismissively calls "bed-time stories" and "fables" contains a large amount of Persian material.

== Manuscripts ==
Gustav Flügel (Note: lack part of Chap V, §.I, material on Muʿtazila sects)

- Old Paris MS - four chapters
- MS Istanbul, copy transcribed by Aḥmad al-Miṣrī for de Slane's use in Paris
- Vienna MS - two copies
- Leiden MS - several fragments

Bayard Dodge (Note: additional to Flügel’s MSS)

- Beatty MS - MS no. 3315, Chester Beatty Library in Dublin; up to Chap. V, §.I, (account of al-Nashi al-Kabir). 119 f.f., handwriting in an old naskh script; belonged to historian Aḥmad ibn ‘Ali al-Maqrīzī. (Note: Aḥmad ibn ‘Ali al-Maqrīzī, historian Abū al-‘Abbās Aḥmad ibn ‘Alī ibn ‘Abd al-Qādir al-Maqrīzī (1365–1441), native of Ba‘albek, became an official at Damascus but later lived in Egypt, where he died; one of the greatest medieval Egyptian historians.) The Beatty MS, a copy of the original, probably escaped destruction at Baghdad in 1258, having been taken to Damascus where in 1423 the historian Aḥmad ibn ‘Alī al-Maqrīzī acquired it. At the fall of Aḥmad Pāshā al-Jazzār (d.1804) it was in the library of the great mosque at Acre and the manuscript was probably divided when stolen from there, and later the first half was sold by the dealer Yahudah to the collector Chester Beatty for his library at Dublin.
- MS 1934 - library adjacent to Süleymaniye Mosque Istanbul; “Suleymaniye G. Kütüphanesi kismi Shetit Ali Pasha 1934”; from Chap. V, §.2., an account of al-Wāsiṭī.
- MS 1134 (no. 1134) & MS 1135 (no. 1135) - Koprülü Library, Istanbul.
- Tonk MS - Sa‘īdīyah Library at Tonk, Rajasthan it originally belonged to the Nabob. (Note: Johann Fück, ZDMG, New Ser. XV, No. 2 (1936), 298—321)
- MS 4457 - Bibliothèque nationale Paris; Fonds Arabe, 1953; cat., p. 342 (cf. 5889, fol. 128, vol. 130), No. 4457; first part; (AH 627/1229-30 CE); 237 folios.
- MS 4458 -BNP; Fonds Arabe, 1953; cat., p. 342 (cf. 5889, fol. 128, vol. 130), No. 4458.
- Vienna MSS - Nos. 33 & 34.
- Leiden MS (No. 20 in Flügel)
- Ṭanjah MS -(Majallat Ma‘had al-Khuṭūṭ al-‘Arabīyah, published by the League of Arab States, Cairo, vo. I, pt 2, p. 179.)
- Aḥmad Taymūr Pasha Appendix - al-Fihrist, Egyptian edition, Cairo, Raḥmānīyah Press, 1929.

== Sources ==
- Dodge, Bayard, ed. (1970), The Fihrist of al-Nadīm: A Tenth-Century Survey of Islamic Culture, vol. 2, translated by Dodge, New York: Columbia University Press[complete English translation].
- Fück, J.W. (1971). "Ibn al-Nadīm". In Lewis, B.; Ménage, V. L.; Pellat, Ch. & Schacht, J. (eds.). The Encyclopaedia of Islam, Second Edition. Volume III: H–Iram. Leiden: E. J. Brill. OCLC 495469525.
- The Card Catalog Books, Cards, and Literary Treasures, California: The Library of Congress, Chronicle Books LLC, 2017, ISBN 9781452145402
- Stewart, Devin (August 2007). "The Structure of the Fihrist: Ibn al-Nadim as Historian of Islamic and Theological Schools". International Journal of Middle East Studies. 39 (3): 369–387. doi:10.1017/S0020743807070511. JSTOR 30069526. S2CID 161910065.
- Nicholson, Reynold A (1907), A Literary History of the Arabs, Cambridge: T.F. Unwin, ISBN 9781465510228
- Ṭūsī (al-), Abū Ja‘far Muḥammad ibn al-Ḥasan (1855). Sprenger, Aloys (ed.). "Fihrist'al-Ṭūsī (Tusy's List of Shy'ah Books and 'Alam al-Hoda's Notes on Shy ah Biography)". Bibliotheca Indica (71, 91, 107). Calcutta: Asiatic Society of Bengal, Baptist Mission Press.
