= Ibn al-Nadim =

Arab scholar and bibliographer (c. 932 – c. 995)

Ibn an-Nadīm
- Born: c. 932; Baghdad, Abbasid Caliphate
- Died: c. 995; Baghdad, Abbasid Caliphate

Philosophical work
- Era: Medieval period (Later Abbasid era)
- School: Aristotelianism
- Main interests: History, Arabic literature
- Notable works: Kitāb al-Fihrist

Personal life
- Occupation: Bibliographer, Historian

Religious life
- Religion: Islam
- Denomination: Shia
- Creed: Mu'tazila

Abū al-Faraj Muḥammad ibn Isḥāq an-Nadīm (Arabic: ابو الفرج محمد بن إسحاق النديم), also Ibn Abī Yaʿqūb Isḥāq ibn Muḥammad ibn Isḥāq al-Warrāq, and commonly known by the nasab (patronymic) Ibn an-Nadīm; c. 932 – c. 995) was an important Muslim bibliographer and biographer of Baghdad who compiled the encyclopedia Kitāb al-Fihrist (The Book Catalogue).

== Biography ==
Much known of an-Nadim is deduced from his epithets. 'an-Nadim' (النَّدِيم), 'the Court Companion' and 'al-Warrāq (الْوَرَّاق) 'the copyist of manuscripts'. Probably born in Baghdad ca. 320/932 he died there on Wednesday, 20th of Shaʿban A.H. 385. He was of Arab or Persian origin.

From age six, he may have attended a madrasa and received comprehensive education in Islamic studies, history, geography, comparative religion, the sciences, grammar, rhetoric and Qurʾanic commentary. Ibrahim al-Abyari, author of Turāth al-Insaniyah says an-Nadim studied with al-Hasan ibn Sawwar, a logician and translator of science books; Yunus al-Qass, translator of classical mathematical texts; and Abu al-Hasan Muhammad ibn Yusuf al-Naqit, scholar in Greek science. An inscription, in an early copy of al-Fihrist, probably by the historian al-Maqrizi, relates that an-Nadim was a pupil of the jurist Abu Sa'id al-Sirafi (d.978/9), the poet Abu al-Faraj al-Isfahani, and the historian Abu Abdullah al-Marzubani and others. Al-Maqrizi's phrase 'but no one quoted him', would imply an-Nadim himself did not teach. While attending lectures of some of the leading scholars of the tenth century, he served an apprenticeship in his father's profession, the book trade. His father, a bookdealer and owner of a prosperous bookstore, commissioned an-Nadim to buy manuscripts from dealers. an-Nadim, with the other calligrapher scribes employed, would then copy these for the customers. The bookshop, customarily on an upper floor, would have been a popular hangout for intellectuals.

He probably visited the intellectual centers at Basra and Kufa in search of scholarly material. He may have visited Aleppo, a center of literature and culture under the rule of Sayf al-Dawla. In a library in Mosul he found a fragment of a book by Euclid and works of poetry. an-Nadim may have served as 'Court Companion' to Nasir al-Dawla, a Hamdanid ruler of Mosul who promoted learning. His family were highly educated and he, or his ancestor, may have been a 'member of the Round Table of the prince'. The Buyid caliph 'Adud al-Dawla (r. 356–367 H), was the great friend of arts and sciences, loved poets and scholars, gave them salaries, and founded a significant library. More probably service at the court of Mu'izz al-Dawla, and later his son Izz al-Dawlah's, in Baghdad, earned him the title. He mentions meeting someone in Dar al-Rum in 988, about the period of the book's compilation. However, it is probable that, here, 'Dar al-Rum' refers to the Greek Orthodox sector of Baghdad rather than Constantinople.

Others among his wide circle of elites were Ali ibn Harun ibn al-Munajjim (d. 963), of the Banu Munajjim and the Christian philosopher Ibn al-Khammar. He admired Abu Sulayman Sijistani, son of Ali bin Isa the "Good Vizier" of the Banu al-Jarrah, for his knowledge of philosophy, logic and the Greek, Persian and Indian sciences, especially Aristotle. The physician Ibn Abi Usaibia (d. 1273), mentions an-Nadim thirteen times and calls him a writer, or perhaps a government secretary. an-Nadim's kunya, "Abu al-Faraj", indicates he was married with at least one son.

In 987, Ibn an-Nadim began compiling al-Fihrist (The Catalogue), as a useful reference index for customers and traders of books. Over a long period he noted thousands of authors, their biographical data, and works, gathered from his regular visits to private book collectors and libraries across the region, including Mosul and Damascus, and through active participation in the lively literary scene of Baghdad in the period.

== Religion ==
Ishaq an-Nadim's broad discussions of religions and religious sects in his writings and the subtleties of his descriptions and terminologies raised questions as to his own religious beliefs and affiliations. It seems Ibn Hajar's claim that an-Nadim was Shiʿah, was based on his use of the term specific people (الخاصة) for the Shiʿah, general people (العامة) for non-Shiʿahs, and of the pejorative term Ḥashawīyya (الحشوية), (Note: Ḥashawīyya means those who believe Allah can be confined to physical dimensions.) for Sunnis. Reinforcing this suspicion are references to the Hanbali school as Ahl al-Hadith ("People of the Hadith"), and not Ahl al-Sunna ("People of the Tradition"), use of the supplication of peace be upon him (عليه السلام) after the names of the Ahl al-Bayt (Descendants of Muhammad) and reference to the Shia imam Ali ar-Rida as mawlana (master). He alleges that al-Waqidi concealed being a Shiʿah by taqiyya (dissimulation) and that most of the traditionalists were Zaydis. Ibn Hajar also claimed an-Nadim was a Muʿtazila. The sect is discussed in chapter five of Al-Fihrist where they are called the People of Justice (أهل العدل). an-Nadim calls the Ash'arites al-Mujbira, and harshly criticises the Sab'iyya doctrine and history. An allusion to a certain Shafi'i scholar as a 'secret Twelver', is said to indicate his possible Twelver affiliation. Within his circle were the theologian Al-Mufid, the da'i Ibn Hamdan, the author Khushkunanadh, and the Jacobite philosopher Yahya ibn 'Adi (d. 363/973) preceptor to Isa bin Ali and a fellow copyist and bookseller (p. t64, 8). Another unsubstantiated claim that an-Nadim was Isma'ili, rests on his meeting with an Isma'ili leader.

== Al-Fihrist ==
The Kitāb al-Fihrist (Arabic: كتاب الفهرست) is a compendium of the knowledge and literature of tenth-century Islam referencing approx. 10,000 books and 3,500 to 3,700 authors, despite being incomplete. This crucial source of medieval Arabic-Islamic literature, informed by various ancient Hellenic and Roman civilizations, preserves from his own hand the names of authors, books and accounts otherwise entirely lost. Al-Fihrist is evidence of an-Nadim's thirst for knowledge among the exciting sophisticated milieu of Baghdad's intellectual elite. As a record of civilisation transmitted through Muslim culture to the West world, it provides unique classical material and links to other civilisations.

In this work Buddhist influence is apparent through a title taking clear inspiration from Buddhist stories of the devadutta "messengers of death" as found in several jataka stories about the Buddha's previous lives. This example showcases that translations of Buddhist stories into Arabic took place within the Muslim community.

== See also ==
- Al-Shaykh Al-Mufid

== Sources ==
- Dodge, Bayard, ed. (1970), The Fihrist of al-Nadīm: A Tenth-Century Survey of Islamic Culture, vol. 2, translated by Dodge, New York: Columbia University Press[complete English translation].
- Fück, Johann Wilhelm. Eine arabische Literaturgeschichte aus dem 10. Jahrhundert n. Chr.
- Fück, J.W. (1971). "Ibn al-Nadīm". In Lewis, B.; Ménage, V. L.; Pellat, Ch. & Schacht, J. (eds.). The Encyclopaedia of Islam, Second Edition. Volume III: H–Iram. Leiden: E. J. Brill. OCLC 495469525.
- ibid., Die arabischen Studien in Europa bis in den Anfang des 20. Jahrhunderts., vol. viii, Leipzig, p. 335
- Goldziher, Ignác, Beiträge zur Erklärung des Kitâb al-Fihrist
- Gray, Louis Herbert (1915). "Iranian material in the Fihrist". Le Muséon. 33: 24–39.
- Nadīm (al-), Abū al-Faraj Muḥammad ibn Isḥāq Abū Ya'qūb al-Warrāq (1871), Flügel, Gustav (ed.), Kitab al-Fihrist, Leipzig: Vogel
- Nallino, Carlo Alfonso. Ilm al-falak: Tarikhuhu ind al-Arab fi al-qurun al-wusta (Astronomy: the history of Arabic Writers of the Middle Ages).
- Nicholson, Reynold A (1907), A Literary History of the Arabs, Cambridge: T.F. Unwin, ISBN 9781465510228
- Ritter, Hellmut (1928), "Zur Überlieferung des Fihrist", Philologika I (Der Islam 17 ed.): 15–23
