= List of rasa'il in the Encyclopedia of the Brethren of Purity =

The following is a list of the rasa'il (epistles) which compose the influential Neoplatonic encyclopedia, the Encyclopedia of the Brethren of Purity composed by the Brethren of Purity in the tenth century CE in Basra, Iraq.

The following tabulation of the rasa'il is principally drawn from a work entitled "Notices of some copies of the Arabic work intitled "Rasàyil Ikhwàm al-cafâ"", written by Aloys Sprenger, originally published by the Journal of the Asiatic Society of Bengal (in Calcutta) in 1848. Doubts have been raised by A. L. Tibawi as to the accuracy of Sprenger's catalogue: "But it is unfortunate that his account is marred by loose translation and too many misreadings of or misprints in the Arabic, and his collection omits the fourteenth tract, merges the eighth with the ninth, and leaves the text of the twelfth and thirteenth confused."

== Mathematical Sciences ==
1. Numbers, arithmetic, and numerology, especially Pythagorean; a discussion of the importance of the number four
2. Geometry (jumatriya). Euclid's definitions and how to calculate the area of a triangle
3. Ptolemaic astronomy (asturunumiya)
4. Geography (al-jughrafiya), especially geography that uses mathematics. The Brethren explain racial characteristics as resulting from varying climates' long-term influence. The Brethren seem to know of Japan: "The most eastern country of this climate is the island of Niphon [compare another term for Japan, "Nippon"]; then comes southern China, then the south of Ceylon, then central India, then subcentral and Sindh, then beyond the Persian Gulf the south of Oman then comes the centre of the country of Shir, then central Yaman, then across the Red Sea, central Messynia; then across the Nile is Nubia....."
5. Music (al-musiqa) deals with the subject in unusually many aspects. It first lays out the power of music and its uses; it uses the practical purposes of music as a defense against various Koranic proscription; another defense is that the restrictions are applicable only to entertainment and pleasure motivated music, analogous to contemporary defenses of poetry). Theologically motivated, it moves on to the abstracted essence of music, which is present in all arts.
6. Deals with ratios and proportions, which are useful in mathematics and also especially in musical scales; indeed, Thomas Davidson describes there assertion thus: "The faculty of aesthetic judgement investigates these properties, and so discovers the rules of Art." Eric van Reijn classifies this epistle as dealing with "Mathematics and Geometry".
7. The seventh and eighth epistles are the "Classification of the Sciences", or "On the scientific arts":
- The nine professional sciences are "the educational sciences, intended to help men to a maintenance, and to direct them in their intercourse with others." They are: reading and writing; grammar and language; arithmetic; sorcery and alchemy and shorthand; "Versification and poetry" or "poetry and music"; business and agriculture; "trades and professions"; selling, buying, and other things of commerce like breeding cattle; and finally, biographies and histories.
- The 6 religious sciences "help the soul in its struggle towards the other world." They consist of: learning the Koran (revelation); learning the Koran's commentaries (explanation); of the hadith and other traditions (tradition); "the knowledge of law and ordinances of God and of legal division" (law); religious obligations and asceticism; and oneiromancy ("illumination").
- The given hierarchy of philosophical sciences is complex. It appears to be as follows:
  - Mathematical sciences
    - Arithmetic
    - Geometry
    - Astronomy
    - Music
  - Logic
    - Poetry
    - Rhetoric
    - Topica
    - Analytica
    - Sophistica
  - Natural philosophy
    - "Sciences of the first principles of a body"
      - Matter
      - Shape
      - Time
      - Place
      - Motion
    - "Science of the heavens and of the universe"
      - What the heavens are made of
      - How many bodies there are in the heavens
      - Why those bodies move
      - Whether those bodies can be destroyed like mundane matter
    - "de generatione et corruptione"
      - The nature of the four elements
      - The influence of stars on the sublunary world
    - Meteorology
    - Mineralogy
    - Zoology
  - Metaphysical sciences
    - Theology
    - Knowledge of angels
    - Knowledge of dead souls
    - Knowledge of governments
    - "Science of things connected with a future state"
- "On creeds and professions"- a classification of the sciences into three categories of professional, religious, and philosophical sciences. The Brethren write:

"Know, my brother, that there are three kinds of sciences with which people are busy, namely: the propaedeutic sciences, the religious and conventional sciences, the philosophical and real sciences." This chapter deals especially with the practical arts.
9. "Where one accounts for characters, the causes of their difference and the [various] species of the evils which [strike] them; anecdotes drawn from the educational rules of the Prophets and cream of the morals of the sages." (from Sprenger). "No. 9 examines the differences of Temperament and Character, with the view of enabling the soul to attain the proper mood and develop a perfect character. Here we have a system of Ethics." (from Thomas Davidson).
10. A summary of Porphyry's Isagoge (the Latin name for his Introduction to Categories, sometimes simply Introduction).
11. A summary of Aristotle's Categories, a portion of his Organon; it tries to encompass all things under the ten categories of Aristotle.
12. A summary of De Interpretatione, another subsection of his Organon; an essay defending the usefulness of logic in general is included after its discussion of Aristotle's propositions.
13. A summary of Prior Analytics, another work included in Aristotle's Organon
14. A summary of Posterior Analytics, another work included in Aristotle's Organon

== Natural Sciences ==
1. According to Sprenger and Godefroid de Callataÿ, this risala is a summary of Posterior Analytics, the followup to Prior Analytics in the Organum; for Thomas Davidson and Eric van Reijn, this risala concerns rather Aristotle's Physics. Regardless, when the Brethren discuss physics, they employ another hierarchical characterization of the Great Chain of Being:
  - Motion
    - Physical
      - Generation
      - Corruption
      - Augmentation
      - Diminution
      - Alteration
      - Translation
        - Straight
        - Circular
        - Combination
    - Spiritual
2. A summary of Aristotle's de Coelo, with a discussion of astronomy and circumnavigating the kaaba at Mecca
3. A summary of On Generation and Corruption. Sprenger says that it "differs widely from Aristotle's work of the same name. It contains a popular explanation of Aristotle's ideas on the subject, interspersed with numerous moral reflections, and other extraneous matters."
4. On matter, space, motion, and time, according to Aloys Sprenger; Thomas Davidson and Godefroid de Callataÿ list this risala as being on meteorology, using Aristotle's Meteorology; van Reijn simply calls this epistle "The Celestial Bodies".
5. On minerals, which segues into a discussion of souls ascending to heaven
6. A discussion of Nature (the metaphysical entity of the Brethren's hierarchy) and its creation of the animals, plants, and minerals
7. A discussion of the various kinds of plants, and of a quasi-Great chain of being view of the natural hierarchy, in which plants are superior to minerals, but inferior to animals, which are themselves inferior to humans, and thence to angels- and all are inferior to the Creator. The Brethren do not see a clear and sharp break between domains, according the palm tree near-animal status because of its division in male and female sexes.
8. "The Generation of Animals" A discussion and classification of animals. (This was the risala the Rev. T. Thomason first published an excerpt from).
9. "The Composition of the Body." On man's body, and a hermetic view ("As above, so below") view of man's body as a microcosm related to the macrocosm.
10. Ostensibly a summary of the On Sense and the Sensible by Aristotle; it lays out theories of neurology and sensory perception and the effects of astrology on portions of the body.
11. Embryology. Which planets control which month of pregnancy.
12. In spirit, a continuation of the ninth, which begins: "Know, O brother, that the knowledge of one's own self is the key to every science and this is threefold; first, man ought to be acquainted with the component part and economy of his own body, and with all those qualities which are independent of the influences of the soul; secondly, he ought to study the soul and its qualities independent of the body, and thirdly he ought to understand their joint action." The Brethren further go on to lay astrological correspondences with bodily parts and orifices.
13. "On the modalities of birth of the particular souls in the natural human bodily systems." The Institute of Ismaili Studies: The Classification of the Sciences according to the Rasail Ikhwan al-Safa. Davidson offers a clearer gloss: "...shows how the partial soul grows in the human body, and how it may thus, before or after death, become an angel." van Reijn reverses this and the previous one, holding that number 25 is on the embryo and 26 is on "Man as Microcosm".
14. "On the extent of the powers of the human mind to penetrate into the mysteries of the universe" and the mysteries of the Creator.
15. On life and death, and how a rational soul is embodied, and why death is not to be feared, since it allows the good to reach Paradise. (van Reijn likewise reverses this and the preceding one).
16. Pleasure and pain, in mortal and immortal life.
17. "The Diversity of Languages" On the purposes and functions of language, and also on the cause of differing languages.

== Psychological and Rational Sciences ==
1. A Pythagorean explanation of creation, a defense that the universe was indeed created in a way deeply concerned with numbers at some point, and that the decimal system- then a still fairly recent innovative introduction from the Hindus - described the universe.
2. "On the origins of the logos (i.e. intellect considered as a substance and not as a faculty)." Eric van Reijn glosses this epistle as concerning the "Spiritual Creation (according to the Sincere Brethren)."
3. "Man as Macrocosm." Further discussion of a macrocosmic correlation with a microcosm of man's body.
4. "On intellect (as a faculty of the mind), and the object of intellect."
5. "On the revolutions and orbits of the stars. The authors enter at some length on the sidereal period, or Yugas of the Hindus, which became known to the Arabs by a translation of the Siddhanta."
6. Love of the soul for the Creator.
7. Resurrection and immortality of the soul; this risala has especial emphasis on the ascension of the soul, and Davidson says: "In this the whole system laid down in the Cyclopaedia culminates."
8. On motion, and on the Cosmological argument
9. On cause and effect
10. "On the nature of simple and compound bodies." (Or possibly "On definitions and descriptions", which is followed by van Reijn's translation as "Definitions and Classifications"; Davidson: "...treats of Definitions and Determinations, and tries to show the ideal essence of things, simple and compound.")

== Theological Sciences ==
1. A lengthy epistle discussing the various disputing philosophies and religions. Concludes that all aim at the salvation of humans, but non-Islamic ones miss the mark.
2. "The Ascent to God". A discussion of how to reach the Creator through a virtuous and pious life, and how some were called by Him to aid the rest in seeking him. The manner of seeking is also described; the only thing pure in man in his soul, so it is the Soul that one must seek the creator through, however slowly must needs be & they will be judged on their progress.
3. "The Creed [or Doctrine] of the Sincere Brethren". An epistle of stories and parables which explain the religious beliefs of the Brethren; death and pain must be spurned for higher and greater things, ignorance must be vanquished, and examples are given from the lives of Jesus, Mohammed, Socrates, Abraham and others to show that they too believed in another greater life, which one must strive to reach.
4. "On the social intercourse of the Brethren of Purity; on the mutual assistance which they rendered each other in the spirit of true charity; on their benevolence, affection and kind-heartedness. The object of this treatise is to inculcate unity, and the duty of aiding each other in worldly and spiritual concerns." or more simply, "On Friendship". A chapter discussing the Brethren's organization and habits (i.e. meeting for purposes of education, assist one's comrades etc.), whose title van Reijn gives as "Friendship and Mutual Assistance", which is the source for the popular belief that the Brethren derived their name from a story in the Kalilah wa-Dimnah concerned precisely with friendship and mutual assistance. This epistle is largely translated by Sprenger.
5. On faith and the believers of them. "no. 45 (4) seeks to show the Philosophic Content of the Muslim Faith, and to explain the meaning of inspiration and obsession. It contains deep wisdom and a dark secret." (Davidson again).
6. "On the quiddity of the divine nomos, the conditions of prophecy and the quantity of characteristics (the Prophets); on the doctrines of the divine men and of the men of God." van Reijn gives a simpler title: "Prophecy and the Divine Law".
7. On the call to religion and the Creator
8. On the states and actions of the spiritual beings.
9. On politics; the ruler par excellence is the Creator, unsurprisingly, and the best human ruler is the one that approaches closest to how the Creator would rule.
10. On the arrangement of the world as a whole. This risala asserts that the universe will return to the Creator, as it emanated from him, based on a Koranic verse: "On the day when we shall roll up the heavens like a scroll, as we produced it at its first creation, we shall draw it back again." (Sura xii. 104)
11. On magic, witchcraft, incantations and the evil eye, along with jinns, devils, angels, magical artifacts etc. Hermeticism is especially apparent in this section.
