= The Case of the Animals versus Man =

Arabic epistle by the Brethren of Purity

The Case of the Animals versus Man Before the King of the Jinn
- Cover of The Case of the Animals versus Man, translated by Lenn E. Goodman and Richard McGregor.
- Author: Brethren of Purity (Ikhwān al-Ṣafā)
- Original title: Fī aṣnāf al-ḥayawānāt wa-ʿajāʾib hayākilihā wa-gharāʾib aḥwālihā
- Language: Arabic
- Series: Encyclopedia of the Brethren of Purity
- Genre: Epistle
- Publication place: Iraq
- Media type: Print

Fī aṣnāf al-ḥayawānāt wa-ʿajāʾib hayākilihā wa-gharāʾib aḥwālihā (Arabic: في أصناف الحيوانات وعجائب هياكلها وغرائب أحوالها), known in English as The Case of the Animals versus Man Before the King of the Jinn, (Note: Or The Case of the Animals against Men in the Court of the King of the Jinn.) is an epistle written by the Brethren of Purity (Ikhwān al-Ṣafā) in the 960s and first published as Epistle 22 in the Encyclopedia of the Brethren of Purity. The longest Encyclopedia entry, The Case of the Animals versus Man revolves around a group of talking animals who testify against humans in a session chaired by the ruler of the jinn. It has been favourably received by literary critics and translated into several languages.

== Plot ==
Seventy men are shipwrecked on the island Sāʿun, which is inhabited by talking animals who had fled from the descendants of Adam to avoid abuse and exploitation. Believing them to be their slaves, the men attempt to subjugate the animals. The animals demand justice, thus a trial is convened by the island's Muslim governor and the King of the Jinn, Bīwarāsp the Wise. The humans are represented by seven spokespeople, including an Iraqi; a Sri Lankan; a Syrian Jew; a Syrian Christian; a Qurayshi; a Byzantine Greek; and a Shiite Muslim. They unconvincingly argue that mankind is superior to animals.

On the other hand, the animals are led by the bee (al-naḥl, king of insects); the griffin or anqa (al-ʿanqāʾ, king of predatory birds); the lion (al-asad, king of predatory land animals); the simurgh (al-shāhmurgh, king of birds); the sea serpent (al-tinnīn, king of aquatic animals); the snake (al-thuʿbān, king of animals that crawl on the ground); and the unspecified king of the cattle (probably the horse, al-khayl). They each appoint one animal to represent their respective species: the bee; the nightingale (al-hazār); the jackal (ibn āwā); the parrot (al-babghāʾ); the frog (al-ḍifdaʿ); the cricket (al-ṣarṣar); and an unspecified cattle ambassador (perhaps the mule, al-baghl).

Throughout the trial, multiple references to the Quran are made; there is also some mention of the Torah and the Gospels. The mule cites Quran 55:10 to suggest that mankind does not have exclusive rights over creation, whereas the humans cite Quran 11:6 in rebuttal. The bee claims that according to Quran 16:68, bees have a skillset superior to that of humans. The animals insinuate that mankind is confused, given the existence of multiple world religions, to which the Persian in attendance invokes Quran 2:115: "Whichever path we take, there is the face of God."

The final argument is delivered by a human speaker from the Hejaz, who stresses that only humans will be resurrected during the Last Judgment. The jinn consider the arguments made by both camps; they sympathise with the animals but fear the response of the men, whom they liken to angels. The closing remarks are made by an enigmatic figure described as "Persian by breeding, Arabian by faith, a ḥanīf by confession, Iraqi in culture, Hebrew in lore, Christian in manner, Damascene in devotion, Greek in science, Indian in discernment, Sufi in intimations." (Note: In Arabic: "al-khabīr al-fāḍil al-dhakī al-ʿābid al-mustabṣir al-fārisī al-nisbah al-ʿarabī al-dīn al-ḥanīfī al-islām al-ʿirāqī al-adab al-ʿibrānī al-makhbar al-masīḥī al-minhāj al-shāmī al-nusk al-yūnānī al-ʿulūm al-hindī al-taʿbīr al-ṣūfī al-ishārāt.") The man suggests that humans have yet to fully realise their potential. (Note: According to Richard McGregor, the man is referring to walāya—the uniquely human quality of "a widened capacity for inspiration, esoteric knowledge and wisdom.") The trial abruptly concludes with the verdict being in mankind's favour.

== Publication ==
Originally titled in Arabic as Fī aṣnāf al-ḥayawānāt wa-ʿajāʾib hayākilihā wa-gharāʾib aḥwālihā, (Note: Literal translation On the Species of Animals, their Marvellous Corporeal Structures and their Wondrous Peculiarities. Also translated as On How the Animals and their Genres are Formed, or On the Modalities of the Coming-to-be of the Animals and of their Kinds.) The Case of the Animals versus Man was written in the 960s by the anonymous Iraqi Brethren of Purity (Ikhwān al-Ṣafā), who were particularly inspired by the fables in Kalīla wa-Dimna. The epistle was first published as Epistle 22 in the tenth-century Encyclopedia of the Brethren of Purity. Among the fifty-two Encyclopedia entries, The Case of the Animals versus Man is the longest and the only one presented as a fable.

In the early fourteenth century, the story was translated into Hebrew as Igeret Baale Haim by Kalonymus ben Kalonymus. The Hebrew version has been translated and adapted into English for a popular audience. The lost Catalan work Llibre de la disputació de l’ase (Book of the Disputation of the Donkey) by Anselm Turmeda, first published in the 1417, is modelled on The Case of the Animals versus Man. An English translation by Lenn E. Goodman was published in 1978. A critical edition of the Arabic by Goodman and Richard McGregor was published by Oxford University Press in 2009. It included a 250-page-long English translation with annotations, which was republished separately in 2012.

== Reception ==
The epistle has received considerable attention from literary critics. According to Ignacio Sánchez, The Case of the Animals versus Man is "undoubtedly the most famous piece of the encyclopaedic collection of epistles (rasāʾil) written by the Ikhwān al-Ṣafā." Similarly, according to Godefroid de Callataÿ, the story is "without doubt, the most famous part of the Brethren’s encyclopaedic corpus."

Writing in the Encyclopedia of Religion and Nature, Richard C. Foltz found the work "unusual" and representing an argument for animal rights that was "striking for its exceptionality for the context of tenth-century Muslim society." Sarra Tlili described the conclusion of The Case of the Animals versus Man as "puzzling", although she acknowledged that "the work itself remains an admirable attempt at questioning anthropocentric preconceptions and engaging with Qur'anic animal themes." Eric Ormsby called the work a "literary masterpiece, as charming as it is profound".
