= Al-Mutanabbi =

Arab poet (c. 915 – 965)

Al-Mutanabbi المتنبي
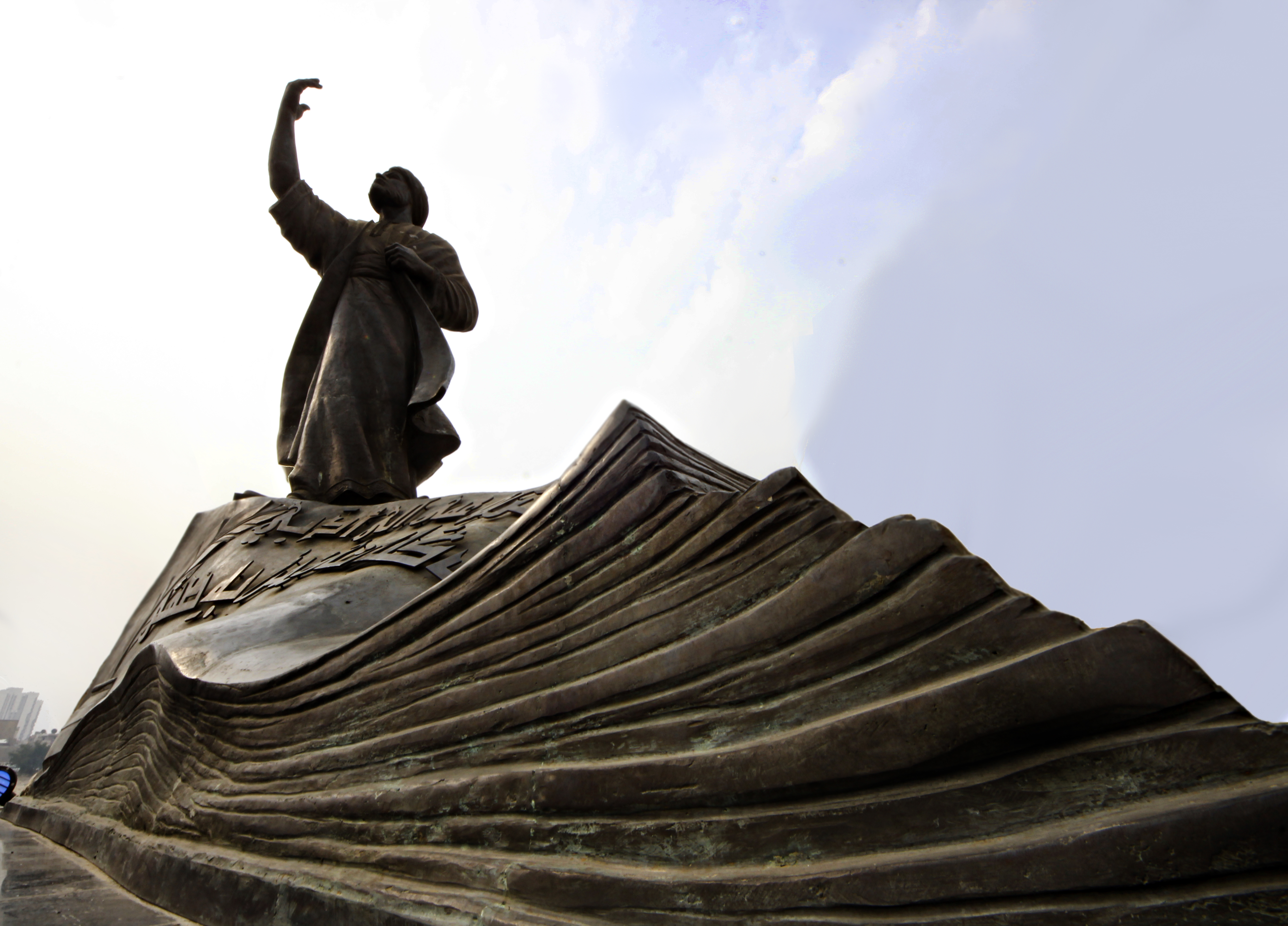
- A statue of the poet in Baghdad's Mutanabbi Street
- Born: 915; Kufa, Abbasid Caliphate (Iraq)
- Died: 23 September 965 (aged approximately 50); An Numaniyah, Abbasid Caliphate (Iraq)
- Other name: أبو الطيب أحمد بن الحسين المتنبّي

Philosophical work
- Era: Islamic Golden Age (Middle Abbasid era)
- Region: Arab world, Muslim world
- Main interests: Arabic poetry

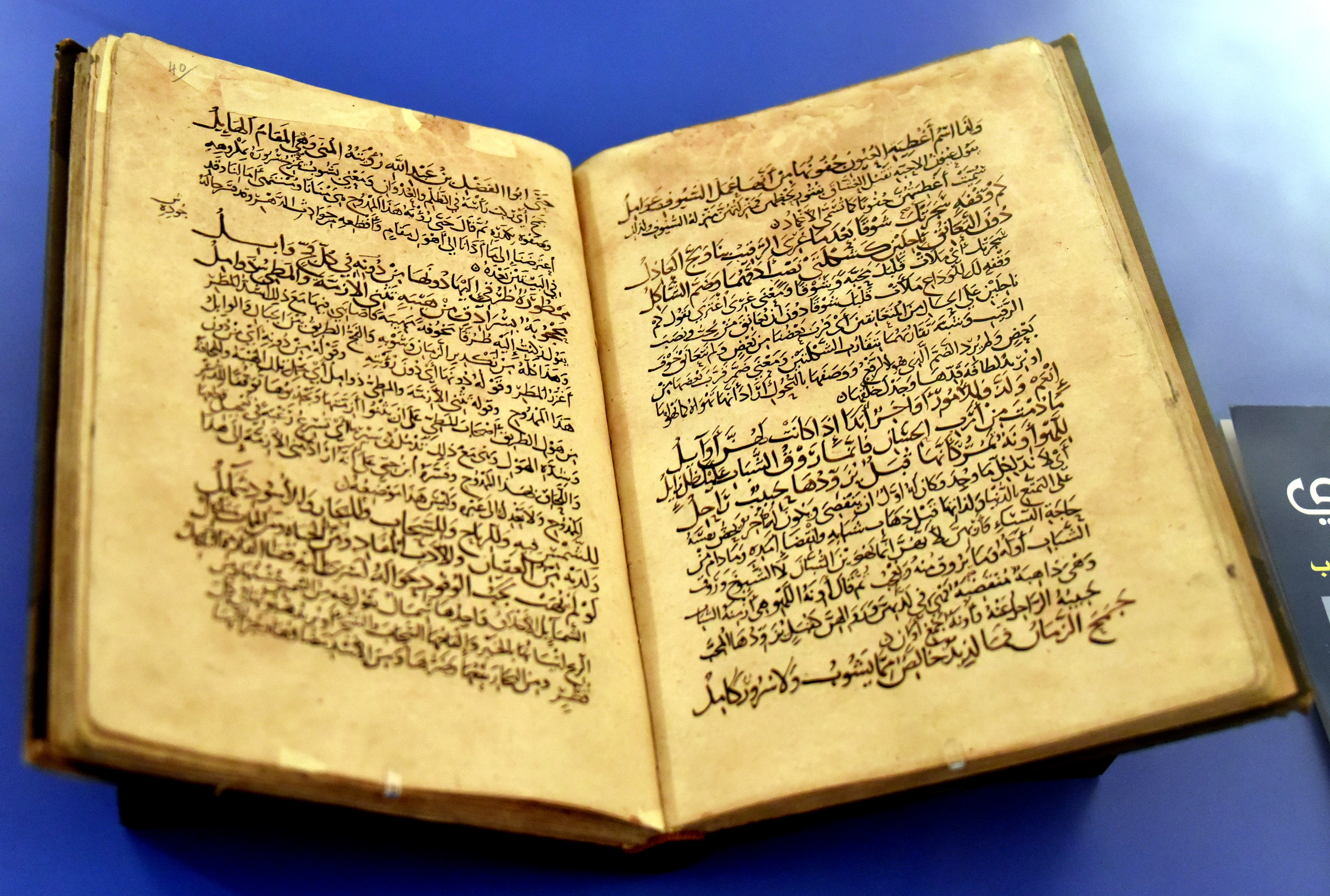
An Arabic manuscript with the Diwan of Mutanabbi (Sharh Diwan Al-Mutanabbi), by the scribal scholar Abu-I-Tayyib Ahmad Ibn al-Hussain, c. 1300 AD, origin unknown

Abū al-Ṭayyib Aḥmad ibn al-Ḥusayn al-Mutanabbī al-Kindī (Note: Arabic: أبو الطيب أحمد بن الحسين المتنبّي الكندي) (c. 915 – 965 AD), commonly known as al-Mutanabbi (Arabic: المتنبّي), was an Abbasid-era Arab poet at the court of the Hamdanid emir Sayf al-Dawla in Aleppo, for whom he composed 300 folios of poetry. His poetic style earned him great popularity in his time and many of his poems are not only still widely read in today's Arab world but are considered to be proverbial.

He started writing poetry when he was nine years old. He is well known for his sharp intelligence and wittiness. Among the topics he discussed were courage, the philosophy of life, and the description of battles. As one of the greatest, most prominent and influential poets in the Arabic language, much of his work has been translated into over 20 languages worldwide.

His great talent brought him very close to many leaders of his time, whom he extolled in return for money and gifts. His political ambitions, however, ultimately soured his relations with his patrons and his egomania may have cost him his life when the subjects of some of his verse attacked him.

== Biography ==
Al-Mutanabbi was born in the city of Kufa (Iraq) in 915. His father claimed descent from the South Arabian tribe of Banu Ju'fa. His last name, al-Kindi, was attributed to the district he was born.

Owing to his poetic talent and claiming predecession of prophet Salih, al-Mutanabbi received an education in Damascus, Syria. When the Qarmatians sacked Kufah in 924, he joined them and lived among the Banu Kalb and other Bedouin tribes. Learning their doctrines and dialect, he had many followers and even claimed to be a nabi (نَـبِي, "prophet"—hence his laqab, al-Mutanabbi 'The Would-be Prophet').

He led a Qarmatian revolt in Syria in 932. After its suppression and two years of imprisonment by the Ikhshid governor of Homs, he recanted in 935 and became a wandering poet. During this period, he began writing his first known poems. Political ambition to be a wali led al-Mutanabbi to the courts of Sayf al-Dawla and Abu al-Misk Kafur but in this ambition he failed.

Al-Mutanabbi lived at the time when the Abbasid Caliphate started coming apart and many of the states in the Islamic world became politically and militarily independent. Chief among those states was the Emirate of Aleppo.

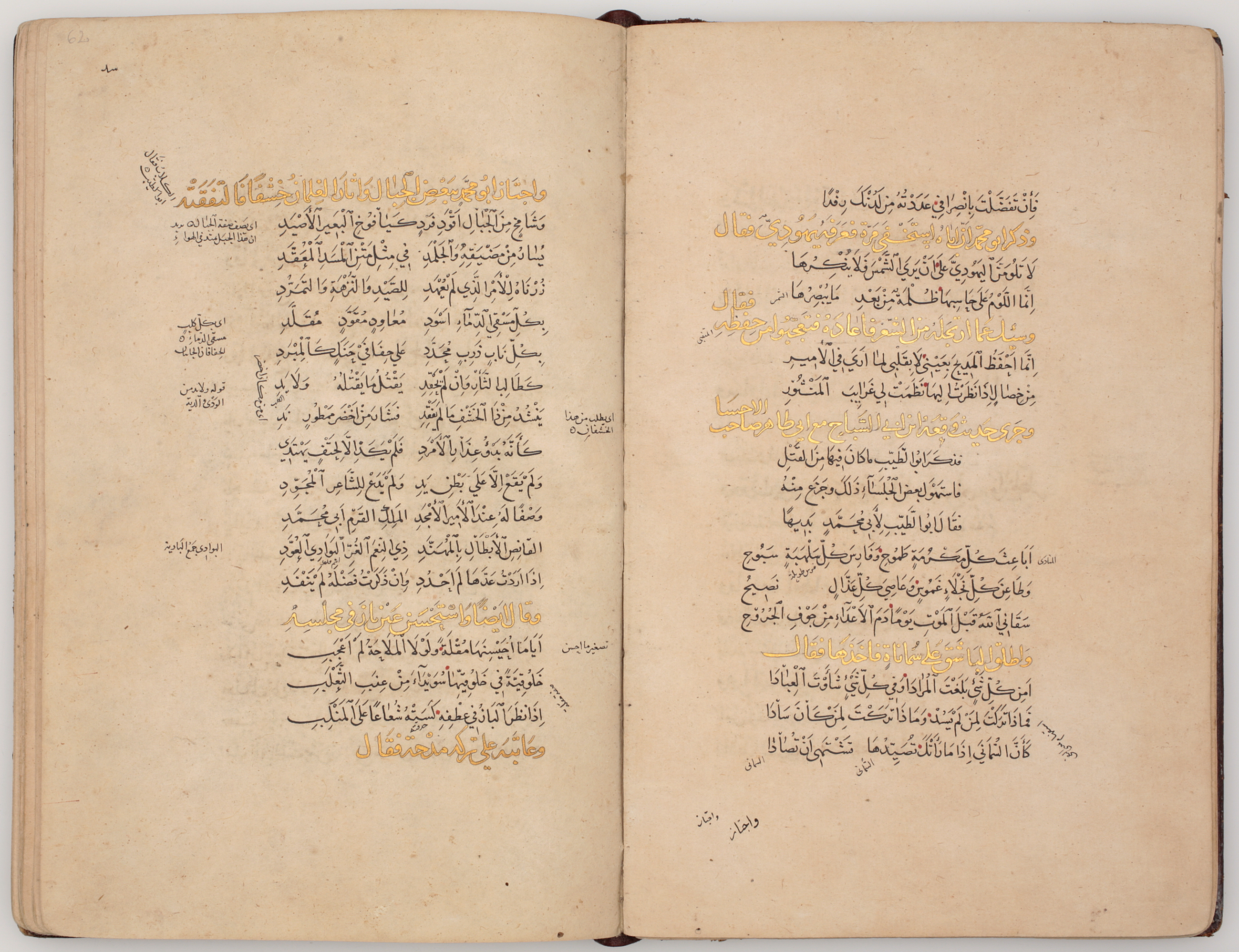
Diwan of the poetry of Al-Mutanabbi from early 14th century Iran, Khalili Collection of Islamic Art

He began to write panegyrics in the tradition established by the poets Abu Tammam and al-Buhturi. In 948 he joined the court of Sayf al-Dawla, the Hamdanid poet-prince of northern Syria. Sayf al-Dawla was greatly concerned with fighting the Byzantine Empire in Asia Minor, where Al-Mutanabbi fought alongside him. During his nine years stay at Sayf al-Dawla's court, Al-Mutanabbi wrote his greatest and most famous poems, panegyrics in praise of his patron that rank as masterpieces of Arabic poetry.

During his stay in Aleppo, al-Mutanabbi found himself at odds with many scholars and poets in Sayf al-Dawla's court, including Abu Firas al-Hamdani, a poet and Sayf al-Dawla's cousin. In addition, Al-Mutanabbi lost Sayf al-Dawla's favor because of his political ambition to be Wāli. The latter part of this period was clouded with intrigues and jealousies that culminated in al-Mutanabbi's leaving Syria for Egypt, then ruled in name by the Ikhshidids.

=== Al-Mutanabbi in Egypt ===
Al-Mutanabbi joined the court of Abu al-Misk Kafur after parting ways with Sayf al-Dawla. Kafur mistrusted al-Mutanabbi's intentions, claiming them to be a threat to his position. Al-Mutanabbi realized that his hopes of becoming a statesman were not going to bear fruit and he left Egypt to Iraq in c. 960. After he left, he heavily criticized Abu al-Misk Kafur with satirical odes.

== Death ==
In 957 Mutanabbi left Aleppo, making his way to Egypt and the court of the Abu al-Misk Kafur. In 960 the poet left Egypt, penning several satires about Kafur. He traveled to Baghdad but was killed resisting thieves before reaching the city.

== Legacy ==
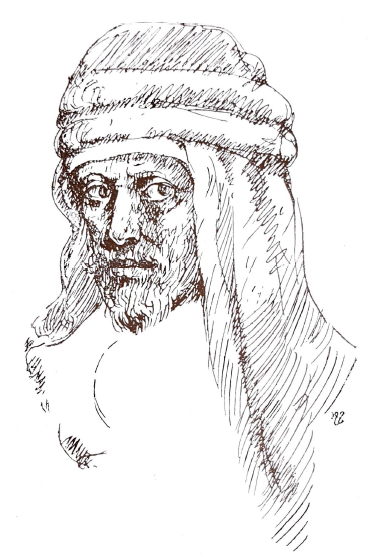
Al-Mutanabbi by Kahlil Gibran

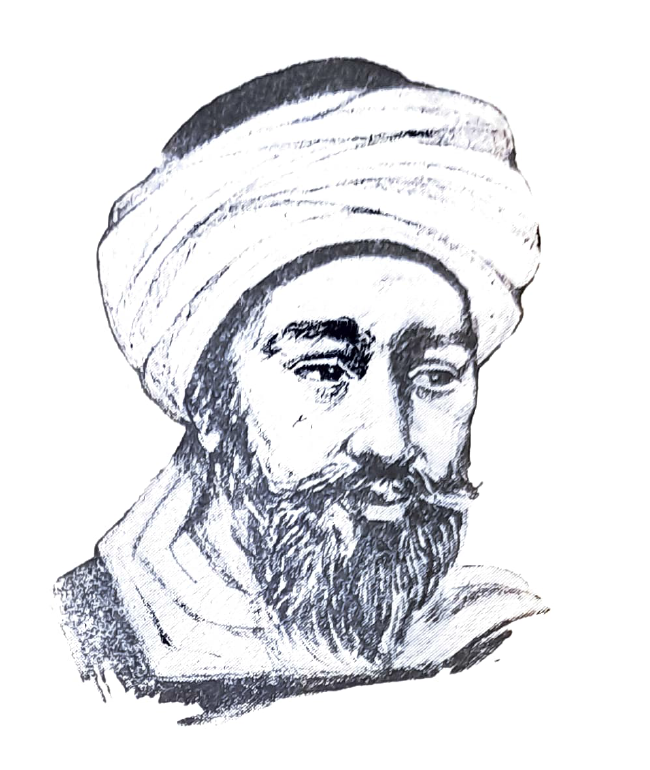
A sketch representing Al-Mutanabbi from a book entitled Sayr mulhimah: min al-Sharq wa-al-Gharb by unknown author, 1961

Ibn Jinni the grammarian (c. 941/2—1001/2) wrote a commentary on al-Mutanabbi's poetry titled al-Fasr ('The Explanation'). (Note: Only in the MS of Al-Fihrist in the Chester Beatty Library.) The poet-philosopher Abu al-Ala al-Ma'arri also wrote a book of exegesis on al-Mutanabbi's poetry. Al-Ma'ari, himself an accomplished poet, would usually refer to al-Mutanabbi affectionately as "our poet". Encyclopædia Britannica states: "He gave to the traditional qasida, or ode, a freer and more personal development, writing in what can be called a neoclassical style that combined some elements of Iraqi and Syrian stylistics with classical features."

=== Al-Mutanabbi Street ===
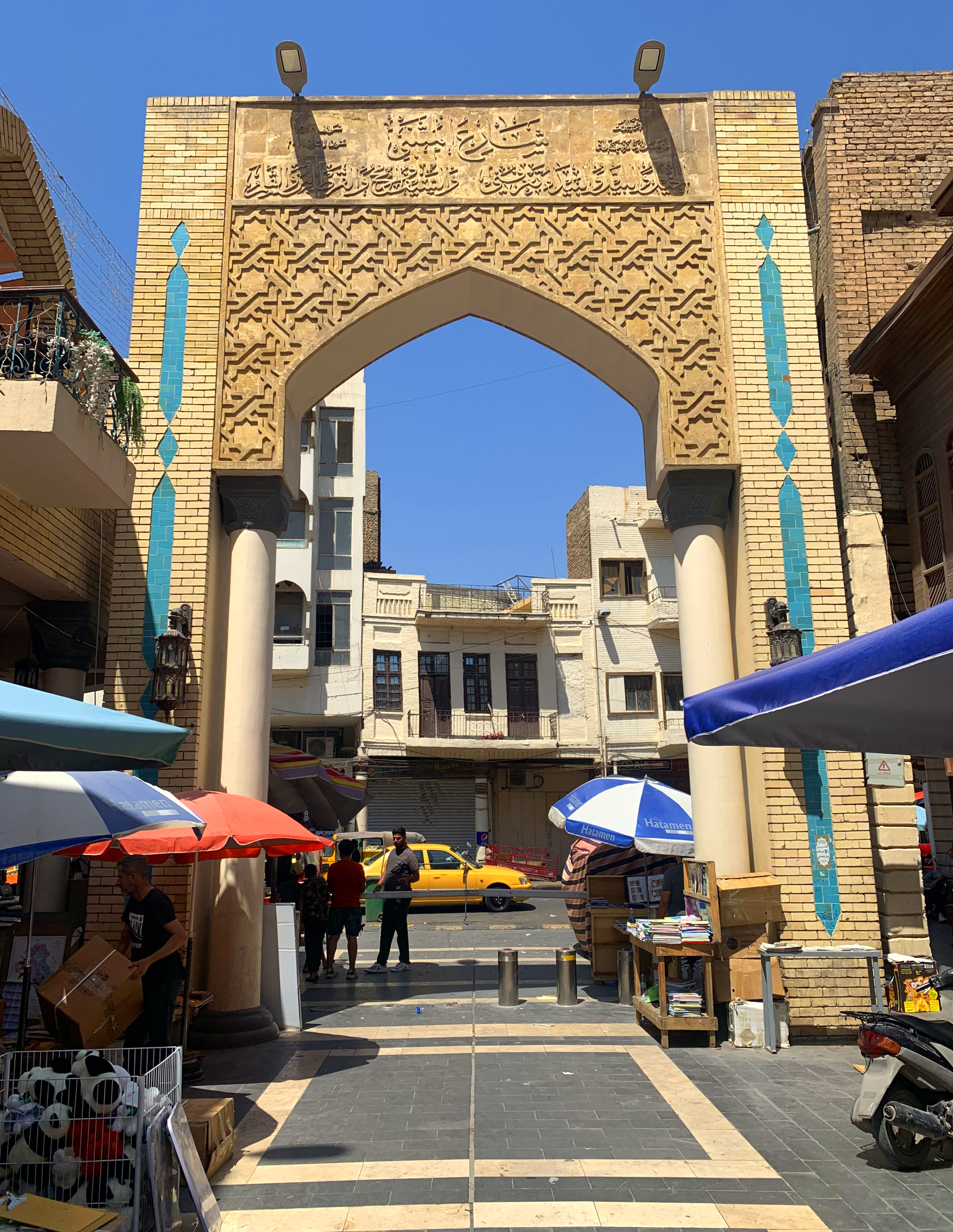
Gate of Al-Mutanabbi Street in Baghdad.

In 1932, Mutanabbi Street, a bookselling street market of Baghdad, was named after al-Mutanabbi to honor him who, at the time, was very well known in the region. The narrow car-free street is full of booksellers and book stores and it's one kilometer long. At the entrance of the street is an arch adorned with the poet's quotes and on the end of it is a statue of al-Mutanabbi that overlooks the Tigris River. Over time, al-Mutanabbi Street evolved into a symbol of intellectual freedom, attracting writers, artists, and diverse dissenting voices from across the country.

== Bibliography ==
- Owles, Eric (18 December 2008). "Then and Now: A New Chapter for Baghdad Book Market". The New York Times.
- Al-Khalil, S. and Makiya, K., The Monument: Art, Vulgarity, and Responsibility in Iraq, University of California Press, 1991, p. 74.
- Al-Mutanabbî, Le Livre des Sabres, choix de poèmes, présentation et traduction de Hoa Hoï Vuong & Patrick Mégarbané, Actes Sud, Sindbad, novembre 2012.
- Arberry, A. J. (trans.), Poems of al-Mutanabbi: A Selection with Introduction, Translations and Notes (London: Cambridge University Press, 1967).
- Gibb, H.A.R. (1986). "Arabiyya, (III) Third to Fifth Centuries, (i) Prose, (ii) Poetry". In Gibb, H.A.R.; Kramers, J. H.; Levi-Provencal, E.; Schacht, J. (eds.). The Encyclopaedia of Islam. Vol. I: A-B. E.J. Brill. pp. 588–599. ISBN 90 04 08114 3.
- Khallikān (Ibn), Aḥmad ibn Muḥammad (1843). Wafayāt al-A'yān wa-Anbā' Abnā' al-Zamān (The Obituaries of Eminent Men). Vol. I. Translated by McGuckin de Slane, William. Paris: Oriental Translation Fund of Great Britain and Ireland. pp. 102–110.
- Nadīm (al-), Abū al-Faraj Muḥammad ibn Isḥāq Abū Ya'qūb al-Warrāq (1970). Dodge, Bayard (ed.). The Fihrist of al-Nadim; a tenth-century survey of Muslim culture. New York & London: Columbia University Press. pp. 189, 373, 1066.
- Nadīm (al-), Abū al-Faraj Muḥammad ibn Isḥāq (1872). Flügel, Gustav (ed.). Kitāb al-Fihrist (in Arabic). Leipzig: F.C.W. Vogel. p. 552 (169).
- Thaʻālibī, ʻAbd al-Mālik b. Muḥ. (1847). Dieterici, Friedrich (ed.). Mutanabbi und Seifuddaula aus der Edelperle [Yatîmat al-dahr] des Tsaâlibi (in German and Arabic). Leipzig: Fr. Chr. Wilh. Vogel.
- Warren, James (trans.), The Complete Poems of Al-Mutanabbi, (Cultural Books, 2022) ISBN 979-8-218-06408-2
- Wormhoudt, Arthur (trans.), The Diwan of Abu Tayyib Ahmad Ibn Al-Husayn Al-Mutanabbi (Kazi 2002) ISBN 9781930637382

== See also ==
- Safa Khulusi
