= Nathaniel Schmidt =

Swedish-American Baptist minister, orientalist, professor, and theologian

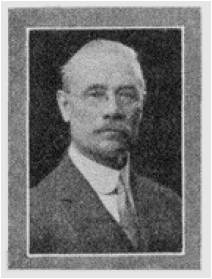
Professor Nathaniel Schmidt, Cornell University (1932 circa)

Nathaniel Schmidt (May 22, 1862 – June 29, 1939) of Ithaca, New York, was a Swedish-American Baptist minister, Christian Hebraist, orientalist, professor, theologian, and progressive Democrat.

== Background ==
Schmidt was born at Hudiksvall Municipality, in the historical province of Hälsingland, Gävleborg County, Sweden. His parents were Lars Peter Anderson and Fredericka Wilhelmina Schmidt. Taking his mother's name when he became an adult, Schmidt married Miss Ellen Alfvén, of Stockholm, Sweden on September 26, 1887. She was the daughter of Anders Alfvén and Charlotta Christina Axelson Puke. Their daughter, Dagmar A. Schmidt, Cornell Class of 1918, (Mrs. Oliver S. Wright, b. 1896), lived in Rockville Center, New York, at the time of the Schmidt's death (1939). He was an avid rower, swimmer, and hiker. He lived on Ithaca's Six Mile Creek.

He received his primary and secondary education at the Hudiksvall Gymnasium, graduating in 1882. He studied scientific and linguistic studies at the Stockholm University from 1882 to 1884. In the summer of 1884 he emigrated to the United States and entered Hamilton Theological Seminary (Colgate University), from which he took his Master of Arts in 1887. In 1887 Schmidt received his Master of Arts from Colgate University, the same year he took a degree from Hamilton Theological Seminary. During 1896, Schmidt studied Ethiopic and Arabic literature, history and theology, at the University of Berlin, studying under scholars such as August Dillmann, Eberhard Schrader, Friedrich Dieterici, Otto Pfleiderer, and Adolf von Harnack. The Jewish Institute of Religion conferred a doctorate of Hebrew letters upon him in 1931. Benjamin N. Cardozo was the commencement speaker.

== Theology ==
A few years prior to his death and reflecting on his life's work, Schmidt used a speech before the Society for Ethical Culture to note that theology, as an area of study, could survive and maintain its influence as a science dealing with religious phenomena only if it increased its level of scrutiny and found new ways of practical application. Schmidt reserved some of his more caustic critique for Christian denominations holding to practices which no longer served the purposes upon adoption. Schmidt's theology was literal and non-traditional. He found no evidence in Scriptures for the miraculous birth of the Christ, nor did the traditional love songs of David prophesy the coming of the Messiah.

In 1930, Albert Einstein prompted a theological discussion through the New York Times Magazine. Eight renown theologians responded to the physicist's views on religion. The Reverend John Haynes Holmes of the Community Church endorsed Einstein's view and noted that it answered one half of two essential questions in human existence. The first question, what is this world? The answer to that question is provided by "Science." The second question, what can be done with the world? The answer to that question is provided by "Religion." In laying out this analysis, Reverend Holmes noted, "[t]his is surely what Professor Nathaniel Schmidt means when he says in this recent book, "The Coming Religion," that religion is "man's consciousness of some power in nature determining man's destiny, and the ordering of his life in harmony with its demands." The commenter then continued by noting that Schmidt's work in The Coming Religion established the theological framework for theology half of Einstein's two-question dichotomy. There is a sense in Schmidt's work of the late 1920s and early 1930s that the First World War changed the nature of people's religious beliefs. In particular, he observed that traditional manifestations of religious expression were in decline, but that the boundaries of religious expression were expanding, and "the essence of religion gaining in clarity, purity and depth." With respect to the study of the Hebraic roots of Western culture, Schmidt's final position was that the expansion of historical knowledge, a widening of the historians subject-matter reach, had lessened the importance of Hebrew heritage.

== Career ==
For two years (1887–1888) Schmidt was pastor of the First Swedish Baptist Church in New York City. He resigned in fall 1887 to take a position as professor of Semitic languages and literatures at Colgate University (1888–1896). Schmidt was also full professor of Semitic Languages and Literature in Hamilton Theological Seminary. Schmidt later held the same position at Cornell University (1896–1932) for thirty-six years. He was the founder of Colgate University's Assyriology program. A year after taking his masters from Colgate, he was appointed professor of Semitic Languages and Literature. Though the teaching of Hebrew was his primary tasking at Colgate, he developed a two-hour course in the history of Babylonia and Assyria. Following his departure for Cornell, Schmidt's work was taken up by Colgate's George Ricker Berry (1865–1945).

=== Oriental studies at Cornell ===
Nathaniel Schmidt's Cornell work was part of a larger early university effort to focus studies on the Near East. In March 1868, Cornell's President-elect Andrew Dickson White sailed to Europe to inspect leading institutions of agricultural and industrial education, recruit faculty, purchase laboratory apparatus, equipment, and books. Cornell Faculty appointees provided White with booklists and the Cornell Board of Trustees allocated $11,000 in February 1868 to make what became "large purchases of books at Paris, Stuttgart, Frankfurt, Heidelberg, Berlin and London". While visiting the University of Berlin, White obtained the first of several private book collections which formed the beginning of the Cornell Library. The 2,500 volume personal library of University of Berlin philologist Franz Bopp was offered for sale by the scholar's estate. The collection was rich in Near Eastern studies sources. After White returned to Ithaca, the Cornell Board of Trustees authorized the purchase Charles Anton's 7,000 volume library. The Anton library added materials on classical languages, literatures and ancient history.

Nathaniel Schmidt took up the teaching of Hebrew at Cornell in 1896, thirty years after the University committed to the teaching of subjects related to the Near East. The first Hebrew instruction offered in Cornell's "College of Languages" was in AY 1868–69. The Reverend William D. Wilson instructed. Wilson was "in charge of Philosophy, the Registrar's office, and any miscellaneous subject that happened to be demanded. Most people agreed that he was a dear old white-bearded saint; but he represented the clerical amateurism of earlier times, when godliness redeemed every lack of intellectual rigor." During AY 1870–1871, Hebrew course taught by Wilson was augmented by a Persian-language course taught by Willard Fiske. The course mustered six students. It met in the evening in Fiske's study.

With AY 1874–75, Cornell sought to expand its Near Eastern (then called "Oriental") studies. Instruction was to be given in Persian, Turkish, Chinese, Japanese, Sanskrit, Hebrew, and the other Semitic languages as there may be classes of students requiring them. The Department of Hebrew and Oriental Literature and History used the lecture system of teaching. It taught the ancient Hebrew literature and history. The notion of "Near Eastern studies" was explicitly centered around "Hebrew". Other peoples were included only in so far as the "national idea of this people cannot be studied to advantage, in its growth and development, without some knowledge of the relations it bears to those eastern nations by which Palestine is surrounded."

The goal of teaching Hebrew and its associated subjects as area studies was realized temporarily in March 1874 when a group headed by the New York financier Joseph Seligman provided a three-year endowment for a Chair of Hebrew and Oriental Literature and History. Seligman insisted that he chose the incumbent. He chose Dr. Felix Adler (Society for Ethical Culture). Adler took his bachelor's degree at Columbia College and his doctorate at the University of Heidelberg. He was "... young, handsome, and popular with the students. His lectures attracted large audiences and many visitors, especially among the ladies of Ithaca." His views on contemporary religious, philosophical and ethical matters made him a continual target of those who wished to attack the University. Although these attackers found it difficult to define exactly the heretical nature of Adler's lectures, in Acting President Russel's words "people talk about 'the tendency, the tendency!'" The Acting President found himself trying to defend Adler's right to express his views, rather than his teaching of Hebrew. After two years it was determined that systematic instruction in Semitics was not being realized. In 1876 the University dropped Adler. This insulted Seligman and relieved Chairman of the Board of Trustees, Henry W. Sage. It also induced Cornell alumnus John Frankenheimer, grandfather of Hollywood producer of the same name, to run for an open seat on the Cornell Board of Trustees, alleging anti-Semitism. Adler later founded the Society of Ethical Culture, of which Nathaniel Schmidt was a fellow and lecturer. Adler's termination left Cornell's Oriental studies program in the portfolio of Professor Wilson, who added instruction in Chaldee and Ancient Syriac.

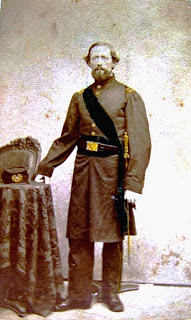
Otto Roehrig

Both the Reverend Wilson and Adler taught Hebrew from a particular social and religious perspective. Wilson was an evangelical Protestant and Adler was a Zionist. Working with them at Cornell during the same period was another professor whose approach was not dictated primarily by either perspective: Frederick Louis Otto Roehrig. Of the German states by birth, Professor Roehrig took both his degrees at the University of Halle. He then served in diplomatic, medical and language-teaching capacities within the Turkish Empire, Greece, France, and the frontier American Northwest. The Sultan of the Turkish Empire decorated him for authoring his treatise on Turkish grammar. He also aided the Smithsonian Institution with contributions on several Native American languages. Arriving at Cornell in 1869 as an assistant professor of French, he expanded the University's offerings to as vast array of Oriental languages by AY 1879-80: the living Asiatic Languages, Sanskrit, Old Persian, and Arabic; elementary Chinese, Japanese grammar (including practical exercises in the Hiragana character, etc.); Mantchoos, Turkish, the Tartar languages, and Turanian Philology, among others. By the happenstance of Roehrig's passion for Near Eastern linguistics, Cornell University developed a niche speciality within the American education market.

The demand for these subjects was weak among Cornell's students. In AY 1878–79, Roehrig's course in Ancient Arabic mustered a mere six students, while Modern Arabic mustered only three; in AY 1879-80 only one Arabic student enrolled; but in AY1880-81 a full ten students enrolled. As for the rationale these students offered for wanting to take Arabic, some students studying Arabic had studied Hebrew and view Arabic mainly as a comparative study of the two Semitic tongues, some Jewish students were well acquainted with Hebrew and took Arabic to gain a broader foundation to their knowledge. Some came to acquire the language practically, contemplating travel or business in the Mashriq and Maghreb. When Roehrig departed Cornell, so too did much of the university's Near Eastern expertise.

=== The Schmidt years at Cornell ===
In September 1896, Cornell's president Jacob Gould Schurman prevailed upon the Board of Trustees to extend an offer to Schmidt. The situation at Colgate's Divinity School had deteriorated. Schmidt's unorthodox theology generated discomfort within that college. From 1886 to his arrival in 1896, Cornell's Library maintained its support for the acquisition of Near Eastern materials. Taking over as Cornell President, Jacob Gould Schurman decided Cornell needed a chair of Hebrew language. In 1896, Schurman persuaded Henry W. Sage to finance a professorship of Semitic Languages and Literatures for AY1896-97 and AY 1897–98. He knew the University could secure Schmidt at a bargain. Schmidt's unorthodox theological views made his stay at Colgate Divinity School untenable. Schmidt gained the respect of the Cornell community. Noted for his personal and scholarly integrity, he was soon shielded by sympathetic administrators. Schmidt served Cornell for thirty-six years, carrying a high teaching load in addition to this extensive research. He taught an elementary course in Hebrew each year. Advanced Hebrew covered the leading writers of the Old Testament and some parts of the Mishnaic and other Talmudic literature in three years. General linguistics students were advised to begin their study of Semitic languages with Arabic, also offered each year. Aramaic and Egyptian alternated with Assyrian and Ethiopic. The Semitic Seminary, given one term each year, was dedicated to epigraphical studies.

Schmidt used the lecture format extensively. His lectures on Semitic literature were devoted to discourse on authorship, dating, literary composition and historical value. The lectures also focused on translation and elucidation of Semitic texts. The Old Testament was central to his syllabus, allowing familiarization with scientific Bible-study. Also integrated into the syllabus were the Hebrew apocrypha and pseudepigrapha, the Mishnah, the Talmud, the Quran, the Arabic poets, the Babylonian Gilgamish epic and the Book of the Dead. He also lectured on Semitic history, divided into treatments of Babylonia, Assyria, Persia, India, Armenia, Syria, Arabia, Ethiopia, Egypt, and the Spanish Caliphate.

Schmidt's linguistic ability was prodigious. Courses followed in Hebrew (including composition, as well as a focus on Genesis, Ruth and Esther); Arabic (including selections from prose writers, poets, and the Qurân); Advanced Arabic (featuring early suras in the Quran, and the Prolegomena (al-Muqaddimah) of Ibn Khaldun); Ethiopic (focused on the Liber Baruch in Dillmann's Chrestomathia Aethiopica, the Book of Enoch and a study of Ethiopian manuscripts); Assyrian (using selections from Meissner's Chrestomathie, Delitzsch's Leestuecke, and Rawlinson's Cuneiform Inscriptions of Western Asia); Aramaic (focusing on the Gospel of Matthew in the Sinaitic Syriac, the Curetonian Fragments, the Peshitta, and the Evangeliarium Hierosolymitanum, inscriptions in the Corpus Inscriptionum Semiticarum, and the Elephantine Papyri); Egyptian (reading the Hieroglyphic texts and squeezes of the Eisenlohr collection); Coptic (using selections from the Gospels and from Pistis Sophia); Semitic Literature (a general introduction to the Bible, including the Apocrypha and Pseudepigrapha; the course was a brief compass on the results of scientific inquiry concerning the origin, date, composition, and character of the Jewish and Christian Scriptures); Semitic Seminary (study of the Syriac Odes of Soloman, and of the Hebrew text coming from the Ciovenanters of Damascus); Comparative Semitic Philology (a study of morphological and syntactical peculiarities of the Aramaic dialects, including interpretation for purposes of comparison, of texts in Mandaic, Babylonian Talmudic, ancient and modern Syriac, Galilaean, Samaritan and Judean Aramaic, Palmyrene, and Nabataean); Oriental History (Schmidt's introduction to the history of Asia, designed to acquaint the student with the civilizations of the Orient; sources, methods of study, and contemporary problems; the epochs, leading figures, and chief institutions. The history of Asia Minor, Syria, Arabia, Iraq, Iran, India, China, Japan, Central Asia, and Asiatic Russia was presented in outline); Oriental History II (This course was an introduction to the history of Africa, including the histories of Ancient Egypt, Libya and the Cyrenaica, Carthage, Mauritania, Nubia, Ethiopia, and the various Egyptian and Maghrebite Caliphates will be presented in outline; the growth of European influence in Modern Africa was also traced).

Schmidt's efforts reached a large general audience within the Cornell student body. Subsequent accomplishments of his Cornell students gained the university recognition as an Orientalist center. In 1900, Schmidt placed Cornell University as one of the twenty-one charter members of the American School of Oriental Research in Jerusalem. Schmidt's year (AY1904–05) in Jerusalem found him doing pioneer archaeology survey and mapping and archaeological expeditions in the Negev Desert and Dead Sea regions. His academic knowledge of the region, its topography and its languages allowed the expedition to gain access to remote regions. The party was, at one point, attacked by a Bedouin war party, and held captive.

During the 1902 summer recess, Schmidt was informed that the Egyptological and Assyriological collection of the University of Heidelberg's August Eisenlohr was for sale through Leipzig bookseller Gustav Fock. Schmidt canvassed University leadership and built enough consensus that they devoted the entire balance of $617 from the 1901-02 book budget to this purpose. The $2000 remainder was to come from the AY1902–03 budget. Thus Cornell acquired the most important Egyptological collection marketed since the death of Karl Richard Lepsius. The Eisenlohr collection contained about 900 volumes on Egypt and Assyria.

Cornell's collection of Egyptian papyri was started in March 1889 with a gift by former President Andrew Dickson White. Donated the year before the founding of Cornell's Sphinx Head Society, the magnificent scroll contains a vignette from the Book of the Dead and was written in a combination of hieratic and hieroglyphic scripts. Long thought to be a spell from the Book of the Dead, the text is actually a Ptolemaic funerary scroll, dating from around 330-30 BCE. The long roll, mounted and framed, hung for many years over the main entrance of Uris Library. White purchased it for the equivalent of about $125 from the Cairo dealer in furniture and antiquities L. Philip, during the trip to Egypt that White made in the winter of 1888–89 in company with Willard Fiske. White was careful to collect documentation on the papyrus, including information on when it had been discovered, and a photograph of the tomb and the mummy with which the papyrus roll had been found.

Before the purchase White had the piece taken to the Egyptologist Emil Brugsch-Bey of the Egyptian Museum for examination and authentication. Based on this report White was able to describe his purchase in a letter of March 15, 188, to University President Charles Kendall Adams:

Most prominent among the illustrations is that of the 125th chapter, representing the dead man standing before Osirus while the god Arubus weighs his heart in one scale of the great balance against the image of the Goddess of Truth in the other. Above sit the 42 avenging deities or Jurors, and below the four funereal genii, etc. etc. ... It is really a fine specimen--complete in itself--and the only such a present on the market--the one at Luxor having been bought, it is supposed by Krupp of Essen.

Cornell adding many more documents to this collection over the course of the next seventy-five years. But after the downturn in the university's finances following overspending in the 1960s, the collection was donated to an institution with the funds necessary to conserve the collection. In January 1972, Cornell gave away all but the Andrew Dickson White Papyrus, the Ptolemaic funerary text.

Schmidt worked closely with J. R. S. Sterrett, who was elected head of Cornell's Department of Greek in 1901. Sterrett was an archaeologist, notably active in Asia Minor. He discovered and translated ancient inscriptions fixed the topography of cities, rivers and states. Sterrett was "a man of very conservative views, of extremely rigorous, even stoical ideal of duty." He planned and organized the 1907-08 Cornell Expedition to Asia Minor and the Assyro-Babylonian Orient. Aiding him was one of Nathaniel Schmidt's most promising students, Albert T. Olmstead. Olmstead "led an ascetic little group through wide ranges of the Turkish Empire--almost literally on foot." Sterrett announced their discovery of a new corpus of Hittite inscriptions. Schmidt took a sabbatical leave of absence during AY 1904–1905 to serve as the director, American School of Archeology at Jerusalem. During his time in Jerusalem, Schmidt conducted archaeological sites examinations at Qudeirat and determined that it was not the Old Testament's Kadesh. He thought the ruins of Petra were a closer fit with the descriptions of Kadesh. On the trip, Schmidt considered Weibeh, Kades and Qudeirah. He rejected them all and concluded that Kadesh was at Petra: "It seems to me even more probable that Petra was the original scene of these stories."

Schmidt's archaeological interests continued back in Ithaca. During AY 1928–29 and 1929–30, he secured for Cornell's Babylonian collection cuneiform tablets from Henry Patten of Chicago, and in the second year, an assortment of some twenty-six artifacts dating to 4000 BC. from John Randolph of Rhode Island. The cuneiform tablets were little used for many years and are now decaying. In AY1974–75, Professor D. I. Owen reintroduced Akkadian to the syllabus and that sparked some new interest in the collection. Otherwise, they may join the Cornell papyri now at the University of Michigan.

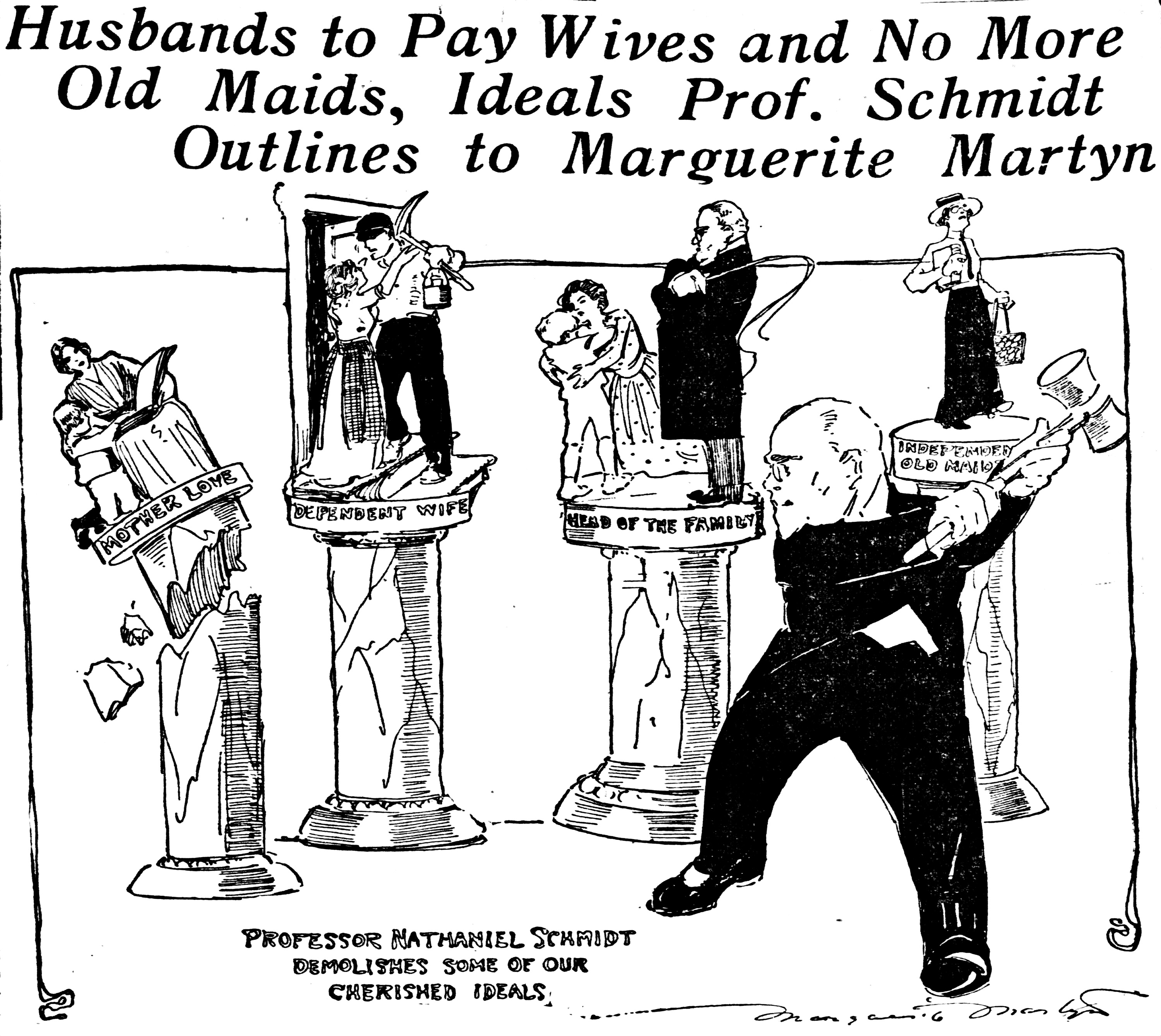
Cornell University Professor Nathaniel Schmidt, foreground, illustrated in a fanciful drawing by Marguerite Martyn of the St. Louis Post-Dispatch as destroying some of the "cherished ideals" of their time (1911), including, from left to right, "Mother Love," "Dependent Wife," the man as "Head of the Family," and the "Independent Old Maid." Cracks have already begun to appear in some of the columns, and the one on the left is collapsing.

During the summer recesses, Schmidt taught and gave lectures across the country. In June 1899, he lectured for the Brotherhood of the Kingdom at their seventh annual conference in Marlborough, New York. The University of Wisconsin invited him to teach Oriental History and Hellenistic Philosophy in June 1909, as one of their summer school faculty. From 1925 to 1935 he taught at Columbia University's summer school.

Beginning in 1910, Schmidt was Chairman, Department of Oriental Languages and Literature, Cornell University and the next year (1911), he joined the effort to save Egyptian antiquities from scheduled flooding by the completion of the Aswan dam. In 1914 he served as president of the Society of Biblical Literature and Exegesis. He spent significant periods working overseas, notably as Director, American School of Archaeology, Jerusalem (1904–05) and Director of the Archaeology Institute of Jerusalem (1923). Schmidt also served as Editor, Ecclesiasticus; President, American Oriental Society and Trustee, American Schools of Oriental Research in Jerusalem and Baghdad.

=== Decline of orientalism ===
In retirement, Schmidt and his wife spent winters in Florida. Schmidt continued to write and served as a visiting lecturer, Princeton University, during the summer of 1938. For many years he was also an associate lecturer for the Society for Ethical Culture. As Schmidt approached retirement age in the late 1920s, Robert M. Ogden, Dean of the College of Arts and Sciences, evinced concern over the future of the Semitics Department. These were years of decline in Cornell's College of Arts and Sciences. When Schmidt retired in 1932, no plan existed to preserve this university scholarly tradition. Even after the end of the Second World War, a further decade passed without the restoration of courses in Semitic studies. In the mid-1950s, Professor Milton R. Konvitz revived the study of Semitics through the Danforth Foundation's support for a professorship of Biblical and Hebrew Studies. Isaac Rabinowitz, an authority on Biblical literature and particularly the Dead Sea Scrolls, was appointed professor in 1957. In 1965, the Department of Semitic Languages and Literature was created. Rabinowitz was its first Chairman. A succession of Arabists was appointed, starting with Professor A. L. Udovitch. This development coincided with a return to the field. In 1958, Cornell and Harvard teamed up to form the Cornell-Harvard Expedition to Sardis, under the aegis of the American Schools of Oriental Research. The project continues a half century later, with a number of Cornell faculty members being involved. Cornell's participation was the result of the interest of Professor A. Henry Detweiler, College of Art and Architecture and associate director of the Expedition from 1958 to 1970. Before joining the Cornell faculty in 1939, Detweiler spent the previous decade working at Gerasa, Samaria, Dura, Seleucia, Isfahan, and other ancient sites in Palestine, Iraq, Syria, Iran, etc.

=== Legacy ===
After the Arab-Israeli conflicts of 1968–1973, the shape of Cornell Semitic studies began to evolve into area studies with the areas defined in new ways. These were exciting years. In 1971, Benzion Netanyahu and brothers Yonathan and Iddo moved to Ithaca to be the new professor of Judaic Studies and chairman of the revived Department of Semitic Languages and Literatures. The department established a new Jewish Studies major in the years following the curtailment of discrimination against Jews by the University between Felix Adler dismissal and the mid-1960s. Netanyahu offered courses in Jewish history and modern Hebrew literature. AY1972 saw two new professors join the department, one specializing in Hebrew language and another in modern Hebrew literature. Netanyahu taught the year-long survey of Jewish history from 614 BC. until the Six- Day War of 1968. Like Schmidt, Netanyahu thought knowledge of a people's history was essential to understanding of its literature. Courses were once again taught in classical and modern Hebrew, Aramaic, the Bible, Jewish religious and philosophical thought, and Hebrew literature from the postbiblical period to the present. Like Schmidt, Netanyahu thought Judaic civilization, no less than Greek and Roman, merits comprehensive and thorough treatment. Cornell saw a rise in Semitic studies during the early 1970s, the number of students enrolled rising from 127 to 313. Netanyahu taught in the department through the Yom Kippur War, even as this three sons returned to carry arms in defense of the State of Israel. The family made many friends during those brief four years, Cornellians heartbroken with the eldest brother, Yonathan, died freeing hostages abducted by terrorists in 1976. The Colonel Yonatan Netanyahu Memorial Fund for Jewish Studies still supports the enrichment of Cornell's Jewish Studies Program. Colonel Netanyahu, son of Benzion and brother to Benjamin and Iddo, was thirty years' old when he fell in command of the Entebbe raid on July 3, 1976. Netanyahu's team of commandos freed 103 hostages.

== Politics ==
Nathaniel Schmidt was a progressive Democrat, noted for his anti-imperialist and pacifist public positions. At this death, he was most remembered for his position on the need to democratize the League of Nations and the need to forgive war debts accumulated by European powers during the First World War. In the 1924 Presidential campaign, Schmidt broke from the Democratic Party and joined future New Dealers Rexford Tugwell and Felix Frankfurter in the political endorsement of Wisconsin Senator Robert M. La Follette's attempt to create a national third party. The endorsement specific sought to advance the "neglected needs of farmers and city workers by hand and brain and others dependent up their earnings." With respect to foreign policy – the field of great interest to Schmidt – the La Follette-Wheeler platform sought to "diminish the danger of war by dealing resolutely with the economic causes leading to war, by reducing armaments, by working for the outlawry of war by international agreement and by placing responsibility for making war directly on the conscience of the people.

In 1900, he delivered an address before the State Conference on Religion at All Soul's Church in Manhattan. On the issue of war and imperialism, Schmidt noted, "[w]hether the State seeks to expand by conquest, maintain its independence in single combat with its rivals, or guard its interests through offensive and defensive alliances, there must be war and preparations for war. But war is such a clumsy expression of tribal justice and such a fruitful source of corruption that in spite of its apparent necessity the marked individualism and the deep moral sense of the prophets of Israel could not allow it a permanent place in their political ideal." His philosophy tended towards Christian socialism, as described in his 1903 address at the Cooper Union entitled "The Republic of Man". The ideas in "The Republic of Man" were in circulation as early as November 1899. Schmidt gave a lecture on the "Political Ideas of the Bible, Old Testament" at the New York State Conference of Religion. The Conference followed from the National Congress of Religions and the Parliament of Religions held at the 1893 Columbian Exposition. The goal was to bridge differences between Jewish and Christian beliefs. In the 1903 lecture, Professor Schmidt noted that man as a species began in a state of cannibalism, developed into an enslaver, then reasoned itself into understanding slavery to be a wrong, and would soon see armaments escalation in the same manner. In the global initiative occurring then at The Hague, he saw – like Alfred Hayes, Jr. – the emergence of a "Parliament of mankind." That parliament would settle, once and for all, the question of warfare. Schmidt also saw the new world institution as a means of redistributing wealth and compensation of offset the inclinations of the free market. This remained his position for the next three decades. As late as 1928, he was a support of the Institute of World Unity and its annual summer school at Eliot, Maine.

After the United States entered the First World War in 1917, Schmidt's pacifism and anti-imperialism was less well received by the American public. His speech before the Political Equality League of Chicago brought hisses after he turned to a critique of British imperial conscription policy. Schmidt found the policy of drafting disenfranchised peoples repugnant, and all the more problematic when justified upon matters of race. In the Chicago speech, he went as far as denying the existence of race. The crowd was partially receptive to the egalitarian aspects of the message. The hissing became more pronounced during the pacifist themes.

When Theodore Roosevelt's growing authoritarianism prompted him to advise British Imperial officials in Cairo, Egypt to curtail the free speech rights of the Egyptian nationalists, Schmidt denounced Roosevelt's actions as counterproductive to world peace. Before the Chicago Association, Schmidt noted there were ways to deal "... more tactfully with those numerous questions which go to make peace between nations than did an ex-President of the United States who spoke in Cairo the other day. The speech was rather uncalled for, I think. Now, a German would say that Mr. Roosevelt was just right. It is the German policy to lay down the law, and if necessary to lay on the lash. They would think it wholly proper that he should tell the Egyptians how to manage their affairs ... I think the truth is that the English policy of pouring money into the country and developing it commercially, and at the same time allowing extreme freedom of speech, is the best one in the long run.

On the eve of the First World War and at a time when Ottoman imperial control over its Syria provinces was weakening (see also Ottoman Syria and Partition of the Ottoman Empire), Schmidt was an early proponent of an independent, secular Syrian republic. Addressing the Eastern Council of Reformed Rabbis at the Temple Emanu-El on the Fifth Avenue in Manhattan, he appealed to Reformed Jews to lead the West in establishing such a secular State centered on Damascus. He cautioned that the significant Muslim and Christian Syrian populations would probably prevent the creation of a Jewish state based on a Syrian option, but a democratic multi-interest republic could succeed through the Chinese model of 1912. Critical to the success of the endeavor, said Schmidt, was the establishment of a secular education system for all.

Schmidt was a supporter of the new Republic of Turkey during the 1920s, when public skepticism of Turkish human rights practices was high (see Armenian genocide). In a speech sponsored by the Brooklyn Ethical Culture Society, he advocated self-rule by the Turks and free international trade through the Dardanelles. Ottoman/Turkish abuses of ethnic and religious minorities were thought to be correctable through greater education of its peoples and elites. In October 1935, Schmidt spoke out against the Italian invasion of Ethiopia. Joining Bishop William T. Manning at the Cathedral of St. John the Divine and a call for the United States to 'decide whether it will join with other nations 'in police action for the preservation of peace.'" Schmidt's subsequent address at the Society for Ethical Culture note that "... whatever the outcome of the situation may be, there will follow a period of moral deterioration. Whether Ethiopia is conquered in a short or in a long drawn-out war, whether by the grace of the great military powers Ethiopia is preserved at the cost of her economic integrity, or whether by her courage and strength Ethiopia maintains her independence, moral deterioration of the peoples involved is unavoidable." Three years later, Schmidt offered an assessment of the Japanese aggression against the Republic of China in terms which connected the capacity to wage an unjust war to the disconnectedness between a people and its government.

== Some publications ==
- The Coming Religion (1930);
- Ibn Khaldun, Historian, Sociologist, Philosopher (1930);
- The Messages of the Poets (1911)
- The Original Language of the Parables of Enoch (1908)
- The Prophet of Nazareth (1905; second edition, 1907)
- "Fundamental Conceptions and Methods of the History of Religion" in 2 Congress of Arts and Science, University Expositions, St. Louis (Howard J. Rogers, ed.)(1904) at 443.
- Ecclesiastes (1903)
- Outlines of a History of India (1902)
- Outlines of a History of Syria (1902)
- Outlines of a History of Egypt (1901);
- The Republic of Man (1899);
- Syllabus of Oriental History (1897);
- Biblical Criticism and Theological Belief (1897);
- Introduction to the Hexateuch (1896);
- New American Encyclopedia, 2d edition (contributing author to over 1,500 articles).

== Memberships ==
Deutsche Morgenländische Gesellschaft, Vorderasiatische Gesellschaft; Deutsche Palaestina Verein, American Oriental Society (President, 1931–32); American Council of Learned Societies; American Institute of Archeology; American Institute of Sacred Literature (director); American Philological Society; American Social Science Association; American Historical Association; International Society for the Apocrypha (councilor); Society of Biblical Literature and Exegesis (President, 1914); and a Fellow, American Geographical Society. Also member, New York Historical Society; Geneva Political Equality Club; New York State Women's Suffrage Association; While teaching at Cornell University, he joined the Phi Kappa Psi fraternity and through that organization, the Irving Literary Society. Also, he was a member of the Town and Gown Club and Cosmopolitan Club of Ithaca, New York.
