= Ibn Jinni =

Arabic scholar and grammarian (932–1002)

Ibn Jinnī
- ابن جني
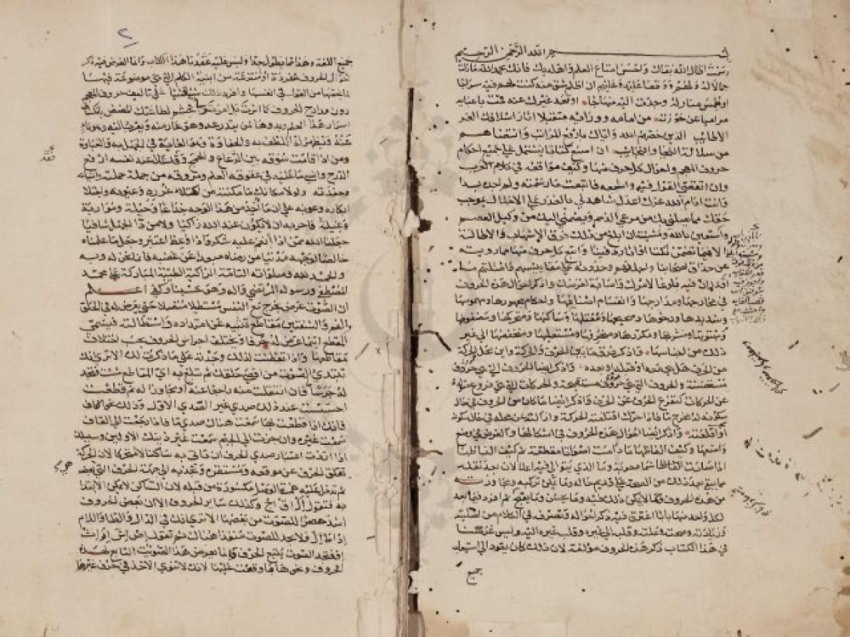
- Manuscript of Ibn Jinni's Al-Mu'arrab (406 AH) held by the King Abdulaziz Public Library, Riyadh. The manuscript, written in Maghrebi script, is a commentary on the Qawafi of al-Akhfash al-Akbar.

Personal life
- Born: 932 CE Mosul, Iraq
- Died: 1002 CE Baghdad, Iraq
- Notable work: al-Khasa'is
- Occupation: Linguist, Grammarian, Phonologist

Religious life
- Religion: Islam

Muslim leader
- Teacher: Abu Ali al-Farisi, al-Akhfash, al-Mutanabbi

Abū l-Fatḥ ʿUthmān ibn Jinnī, widely known as Ibn Jinni (Arabic: ابن جني, lit. 'Son of Gennaios'; 932–1002), was an Arab linguist, grammarian, and phonologist of Greek descent, renowned for his innovative contributions to Arabic grammar, morphology, and phonology. His work in linguistic philosophy and morphology played a significant role in advancing the study of theoretical linguistics in Arabic. His most influential work, al-Khasā'is ("The Characteristics"), delves into the origins of the Arabic language, analogical reasoning in grammar, and the philosophical underpinnings of linguistic theory. Ibn Jinni's contributions profoundly expanded the study of Arabic linguistics to include phonetics and morphophonology, marking a significant advancement in the field. He studied for 40 years under the renowned grammarian Abu Ali al-Farisi and was closely associated with the poet al-Mutanabbi. Ibn Jinni distinguished himself as the inaugural commentator on al-Mutanabbi’s poems, setting a foundational precedent in literary analysis and criticism. Serving as a scholar in the Buwayhid court, Ibn Jinni's influence extended beyond academia, cementing his role as a key figure in the development of Arabic linguistic thought.

== Name ==
The name "Jinni" is an arabised form of the Greek name Gennaios (γενναῖος), meaning "noble" or "of noble birth." Ibn Jinni himself mentioned his father was named "fāḍilan" (noble) in Greek ("bi-l-rūmiyyah"), referring to the language of the Greek-speaking Byzantines who self-identified as Rhōmaîoi, or Romans. Gennaios was a freed Greek slave owned by Sulayman ibn Fahd, the vizier to Qirwash ibn al-Muqallad, the 'Uqaylid governor of Mosul. "Jinni" here in Ibn Jinni's name should not be confused with the singular form ("jinni") of the collective Jinn.
