= Banu Ju'fa =

Arabian tribe

Banu Ju'fa بنو جعفى
- Qahtanite Arabs
- Banner of Ju'fa at the Battle of Siffin (657)
- Ethnicity: Arab
- Nisba: Al-Ju'fi الجعفي
- Location: Yemen
- Descended from: Ju'fi ibn Sa'd al-'Ashirah
- Parent tribe: Madh'hij
- Religion: Paganism, later Islam

Banu Ju'fa (Arabic: بنو جعفى) known also as Ju'fa, is an Arabian tribe descended from Sa'd al-Ashirah of the larger Madh'haj tribe.

The Famous Abbasid Arab poet Al-Mutanabbi is a descendant of Banu Ju'fa.

== History and origins ==
The tribe is named after Ju'fi ibn Sa'd al-'Ashirah ibn Madh'hij (جعفي بن سعد العشيرة بن مذحج) and Ju'fi had two sons: Marran and Harim. The tribe is known to be originally from a place called Al-Mahjam in Yemen. After Islam, under the Rashidun Caliphate, the tribe immigrated in large numbers to the newly conquered Kufa in Iraq and settled there. The Ju'fi tribe played an important role in the early Umayyad Caliphate, and they are known to always favor the Umayyads side in conflicts. Many prominent figures are attributed to Banu Ju'fa tribe. For example, a man from Ju'fa called Yazid al-Ju'fi is said to be the one where Yazidis derived the name from. Another figure is Zahr ibn Qays al-Ju'fi, who carried the head of al-Husayn to Caliph Yazid I in Damascus.

== See also ==
- Tribes of Arabia
- Pre-Islamic Arabia
