= Alessandro Bausani =

Italian scholar

- Born: 29 May 1921; Rome, Italy
- Died: 12 March 1988 (aged 66); Rome, Italy
- Occupations: Islamic Studies scholar, writer, scholar of Iranian studies, Arabic studies scholar, creator of artificial language, historian of religion, Italian translator
- Writing career
- Period: 20th century

Alessandro Bausani (29 May 1921 – 12 March 1988) was a scholar of Islam, Arab and Persian studies, interlinguistics and the history of religion, translating many works into Italian. He was one of the greatest Italian scholars of Islam, as well as a translator and commentator of one of the most important translations of the Qur'an into the Italian language.

A great polyglot, he spoke more than 30 languages, including Esperanto, African and Native American languages such as Cherokee and several important languages in the islamic world such as Indonesian, Arabic, Persian and Turkish.

== Education ==
Bausani first studied Arabic with a neighbour, Virginia Vacca. By 1942, during World War II, he was sufficiently fluent in Persian to deliver radio broadcasts for Radio Roma. In 1943–1944, he learned Turkish under Paul Mulla. He received his doctorate from the Sapienza University of Rome in 1943 for a thesis on Persian syntax. By 1949, Bausani had abandoned his Catholic faith. He flirted with Protestantism before converting to the Baháʼí Faith by 1955.

== Academic career ==
From 1956 to 1971 Bausani taught Persian language and literature and Indonesian language as well as Indonesian literature at the Istituto Universitario Orientale in Naples. There he instituted teaching of the Urdu language and Urdu literature as well as Persian literature of India. He later taught Islamic studies at the Scuola Orientale of the Facoltà di Lettere e Filosofia of the Università di Roma "La Sapienza".

Both universities, and the Venezia were leading centres of Oriental studies, and his work drew great interest from students, created a school which is still today highly activity in studying the field of mystical-religious experience in the Islamic world, as well as study of Sunni and Shi'ite Islam. His work included the translation into Italian of the poetry of Muhammad Iqbal (Parma, 1956), as well as that of Nizami, Omar Khayyam and Rumi.

He also taught the History of Religion and was responsible for history and philosophy of the Middle East and Far East at the Istituto Universitario Orientale di Napoli and the Società Nazionale dell'Accademia dei Lincei.

He served as the President of the Istituto per l'Oriente in Rome.

== Influence ==
Alessandro Bausani's influence was recognised by diverse communities. His significance as an Italian scholar was noted in his inclusion in the Treccani Enciclopedia Italiana. His significance as a scholar of Iranian culture is reflected by the entry on his work in the Encyclopædia Iranica. The value of his work in the field of Indonesian studies was noted in an obituary published in the journal Indonesia Circle. An obituary published in the Baháʼí Studies Review demonstrates the recognition his work gained in the religious community to which he belonged.

== Publications ==
A bibliography of his work up until 1 May 1981 is found in La bisaccia dello sheikh. Omaggio ad Alessandro Bausani islamista nel sessantesimo compleanno, Venezia, Quaderni del Seminario di Iranistica, Uralo-Altaistica e Caucasologia dell'Università degli studi di Venezia, 1981.

Here is a selection of his principal works:

=== Main translations of religious texts ===
- Il Corano, introduzione, traduzione e commento, Firenze, Sansoni, 1955 (Translation of the Qur'an into Italian)
- Testi religiosi zoroastriani, Catania, Ed. Paoline, 1962 (Zoroastrian Religious Texts)
- La bbona notizzia. Vangelo di Matteo nella versione romanesca di Alessandro Bausani, Recco (Ge), Gruppo Editoriale Insieme, 1992 (The Good News, the Gospel of Matthew: a Romanesco Dialect version by Alessandro Bausani)

=== Translations from Persian ===
- Omar Khayyam, Quartine (Roba'iyyat), Torino, Einaudi, 1956 (Rubaiyat of Omar Khayyam)
- Avicenna, Opera poetica, Roma, Carucci, 1956 (Poetic Works)
- Rumi, Poesie mistiche, Milano, Rizzoli-BUR, 1980 (Mystic Poetry)
- Nezami, Le sette principesse, Milano, Rizzoli-BUR, 1982 (The Seven Princesses)
- Muhammad Iqbal, Il poema celeste, Bari, Leonardo da Vinci, 1965 (The Heavenly Poem)

=== Monographs ===
- "Sguardo alle letterature del Pakistan", in Oriente Moderno, XXXVII (1957), pp. 400–424 (An examination of the literature of Pakistan)
- Storia delle letterature del Pakistan. Urdu, Pangiâbî, Sindhî, Beluci, Pasc'tô, Bengali, Pakistana, Milano, 1958 (History of the Literature of Pakistan)
- Persia Religiosa, da Zaratustra a Bahá'u'lláh, 1959 (Persian Religion from Zoroaster to Bahá'u'lláh)
- Storia della Letteratura persiana, 1960 (The History of Persian Literature)
- I Persiani, Firenze, Sansoni, 1962 (The Persians)
- L'Islam non arabo, in Storia delle religioni, fondata da P. Tacchi Venturi (ed. interamente rifatta e ampliata), Torino, 1970-1 ("Non-Arab Islam" in "The History of Religions")
- Le lingue inventate, Roma, 1974 (trad. tedesca abbreviata e anticipata Geheim- und Universalsprachen: Entwicklung und Typologie, Stoccarda, 1973) (Constructed Languages)
- Buddha, Chiasso, 1973
- L'Enciclopedia dei Fratelli della Purità, Napoli, Istituto Universitario Orientale, 1978. (Encyclopedia of the Brethren of Purity)
- L'Islam, Milano, Garzanti, 1980
- Una rosa d'Oriente: Tahirih, Cosenza, Tipografia Gnisci, 1980 (A Rose of the East)
- La fede Baháʼí e l'unità del genere umano. (The Baháʼí Faith and the Oneness of Humanity)
- Saggi sulla fede Baháʼí, Roma, Casa Editrice Baháʼí, 1991 (Studies on the Baháʼí Faith)

=== Other ===
- Can Monotheism Be Taught? (Further Considerations on the Typology of Monotheism). Numen, Vol. 10, Fasc. 3 (Dec., 1963), pp. 167–201. Brill.

== Bibliography ==
- "Alessandro Bausani". Biografie e bibliografie degli Accademici Lincei. Rome: Accademia nazionale dei Lincei. 1976. pp. 719–722. OCLC 923099031.
- “In memoria di Alessandro Bausani nel decennale della morte (1988–1998)”, su: Oriente Moderno, n.s. LXXVIII (1998), 3, pp. da 421 a 529.
- Oscar Nalesini (2009). L'Asia Sud-orientale nella cultura italiana. Bibliografia analitica ragionata, 1475-2005. Rome: Istituto Italiano per l'Africa e l'Oriente. p. 17 le biografie. ISBN 978-88-6323-284-4.
