= Sarra Tlili =

Arab and Islamic studies scholar

Sarra Tlili is an Arab and Islamic studies scholar and associate professor of Arabic language and literature at the University of Florida.

== Biography ==
She earned her Ph.D. in 2009 from the University of Pennsylvania’s Department of Near Eastern Languages and Civilizations, where she had earlier completed her M.A. in Arabic and Islamic Studies.

== Selected works ==
- Animals in the Qur'an (2012)
