= Lenn E. Goodman =

American philosopher (born 1944)

- Born: Alan Mittleman Lenn Goodman; 1944 (age 81–82)

Education
- Education: Harvard University

Philosophical work
- Era: Contemporary philosophy
- Region: Western philosophy
- School: Jewish philosophy
- Institutions: Vanderbilt University

Lenn Evan Goodman (born 1944) is an American Jewish philosopher. His philosophy, particularly his constructive work, draws from classical and medieval sources as well as religious texts. Goodman is also an academic, scholar, and a historian with research interest in metaphysics, ethics, and Jewish philosophy. He is serving as a professor of philosophy at Vanderbilt University.

== Biography ==
Goodman was born in Detroit, Michigan. He is the son of Calvin and Florence Goodman. His father was a World War II veteran while his mother was a poet and professor of English. His family moved to Cambridge, Massachusetts and later to Putney, Vermont before finally settling in Los Angeles, California.

In 1965, Goodman completed a bachelor's degree in Philosophy and Middle Eastern Languages and Literatures at Harvard University. He later obtained his doctorate in 1968 as a Marshall Scholar. Goodman started teaching at the University of California Los Angeles, (UCLA) in 1969. He transferred to the University of Hawaii and was part of its Department of Philosophy until 1994. He is currently an Andrew W. Mellon Professor in Humanities at Vanderbilt University.

Goodman was a recipient of several awards such as the Baumgardt Memorial Award, the Gratz Centennial Prize, and the Earl Sutherland Prize, which is Vanderbilt University's highest research award.

Goodman is married to Roberta Goodman. He was previously married to Madeline Goodman, who died in 1996. He is the father of the novelist and short story writer Allegra Goodman and Paula Fraenkel.

== Works ==
One of Goodman's philosophical projects is realist messianism, which evaluates the means to the messianic end. Particularly, Goodman holds that the Torah and the way its principles are operationalized can be used to refine and perfect human nature. According to him, such refinement process leads towards a messianic age. It is associated with the Jewish concept of olam ha-ba or the world to come, which is used instead of the after life. It constitutes an internalist position wherein the arrival of the Messiah is not enough if there is no moral transformation among the faithful. The messianic age is said to be the teleological consummation of human intellectual, moral, and spiritual potential. Goodman distinguished this concept from the personal Messiah, which he said is not particularly successful among the Jewish people.

Goodman also used Baruch Spinoza's views in his discourse on Jewish philosophy. Particularly, he maintained that the Dutch thinker's philosophy addresses the problems that the Jewish philosophical tradition share with other school through creative and constructive solutions. Goodman also found several Jewish themes in the Spinoza's philosophy. There is, for instance, the strong emphasis on philosophical monotheism, driving what Goodman believes as the most coherent metaphysical approach to philosophical speculation. Goodman also supported Spinoza's reconciliations of classical oppositions. This is demonstrated in the way perfection and imperfection have been reconciled. In reconstructing Spinoza, Goodman, said that God becomes the image of imperfect humanity not because perfection "becomes an active principle at work in the mind".

Goodman translated Ibn Tufayl's 12th-century Arabic novel called Hayy ibn Yaqzan. This work also included philosophical commentary. He also published a study called Maimonidean Naturalism, which belonged to the body of literature that attempted to articulate Maimonides views on creation.
