= Brethren of Purity =

Medieval secret society of Muslim philosophers

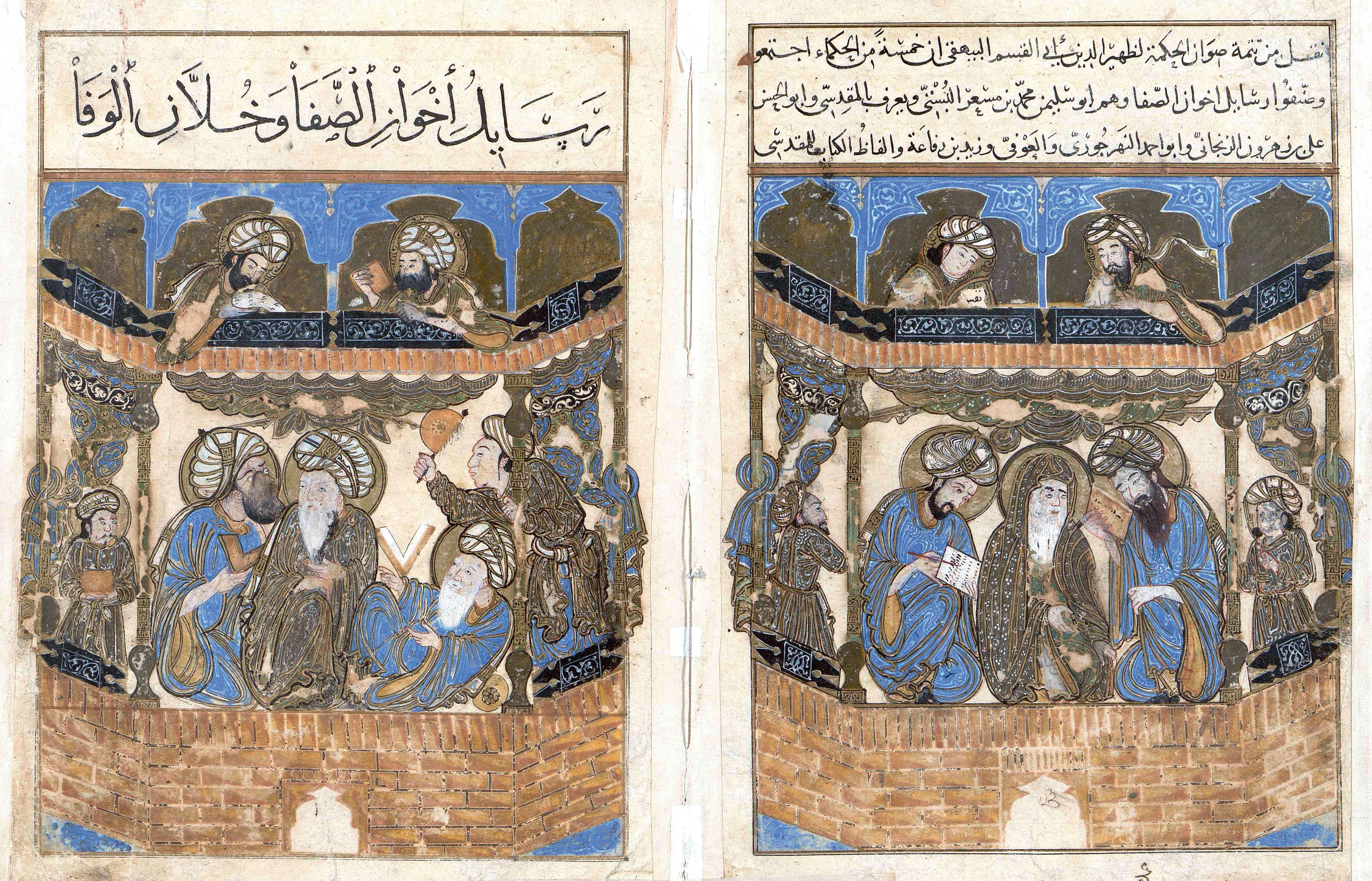
Double-leaf frontispiece from the "Encyclopedia of the Brethren of Purity", Süleymaniye Library, Baghdad, 1287.

The Brethren of Purity, (Note: (Arabic: إخوان‌ الصفاء, romanized: ʾIkhwān aṣ-Ṣafāʾ) also known as The Brethren of Sincerity, were a secret society active during the reign of the Buyid dynasty.

Presumably composed of Muslim philosophers centered in the Buyid port city of Basra, the structure of the organization and the identities of its members have never been clear. Their esoteric teachings and philosophy are expounded in an epistolary style in the Encyclopedia of the Brethren of Purity (Rasā'il Ikhwān al-Ṣafā'), a giant compendium of 52 epistles that would greatly influence later encyclopedias. A good deal of Muslim and Western scholarship has been spent on just pinning down the identities of the Brethren and the century in which they were active.

== Name ==
The Arabic phrase Ikhwān aṣ-Ṣafāʾ (short for, among many possible transcriptions, Ikhwān aṣ-Ṣafāʾ wa Khullān al-Wafā wa Ahl al-Ḥamd wa abnāʾ al-Majd, meaning "Brethren of Purity, Loyal Friends, People worthy of praise and Sons of Glory") can be translated as either the "Brethren of Purity" or the "Brethren of Sincerity"; various scholars such as Ian Netton prefer "of Purity" because of the group's ascetic impulses towards purity and salvation.

A suggestion made by Ignác Goldziher, and later written about by Philip Khuri Hitti in his History of the Arabs, is that the name is taken from a story in Kalilah waDimnah, in which a group of animals, by acting as faithful friends (ikhwān aṣ-ṣafāʾ), escape the snares of the hunter. The story concerns a Barbary dove and its companions who become entangled in the net of a hunter trapping birds. Together, they betake themselves, still entangled in the net, to a nearby rat, who is gracious enough to gnaw the birds free of the cords in which they have become enmeshed. Impressed by the rat's altruistic deed, a crow strikes up a friendship with him. Soon afterward a tortoise and gazelle also join the company of animals. Some time later, the gazelle becomes trapped in another net; but with the aid of the kind rat and the other animals, it is soon freed. The tortoise, however, is too slow in making his escape and finds himself captured by the hunter. In the final turn of events, the gazelle repays the tortoise by serving as a decoy and distracting the hunter while the rat and the others free the tortoise. After this, the animals are designated as the "Ikhwān aṣ-Ṣafāʾ".

This story is mentioned as an exemplum when the Brethren speak of mutual aid in one risāla (epistle), a crucial part of their system of ethics that has been summarized thus:

In this Brotherhood, self is forgotten; all act by the help of each, all rely upon each for succour and advice, and if a Brother sees it will be good for another that he should sacrifice his life for him, he willingly gives it.

== Meetings ==
The Brethren regularly met on a fixed schedule. The meetings apparently took place on three evenings of each month: once near the beginning, in which speeches were given, another towards the middle, apparently concerning astronomy and astrology, and the third between the end of the month and the 25th of that month; during the third one, they recited hymns with philosophical content. During their meetings and possibly also during the three feasts they held, on the dates of the sun's entry into the Zodiac signs "Ram, Cancer, and Balance" (which doubled as the March equinox, summer solstice, and September equinox), beyond the usual lectures and discussions, they would engage in some manner of liturgy reminiscent of the Sabians of Harran.

== Ranks ==
Hierarchy was a major theme in the Encyclopedia, and unsurprisingly, the Brethren loosely divided themselves up into four ranks by age; the age guidelines would not have been firm: for example, such an exemplar of the fourth rank as Jesus would have been too young if the age guidelines were absolute and fixed. Compare the similar division of the Encyclopedia into four sections and the Jabirite symbolism of 4. The ranks were:

1. The "Craftsmen" – a craftsman had to be at least 15 years of age; their honorific was the "pious and compassionate" (al-abrār wa 'l-ruhamā).
2. The "Political Leaders" – a political leader had to be at least 30 years of age; their honorific was the "good and excellent" (al-akhyār wa 'l-fudalā)
3. The "Kings" – a king had to be at least 40 years of age; their honorific was the "excellent and noble" (al-fudalā' al-kirām)
4. The "Prophets and Philosophers" – the most aspired-to, the final and highest rank of the Brethren; to become a Prophet or Philosopher a man had to be at least 50 years old; their honorific compared them to historical luminaries such as Jesus, Socrates, or Muhammad, who were also classified as Kings; this rank was the "angelic rank" (al-martabat al-malakiyya).

== Identities ==
There have been a number of theories as to the authors of the Brethren. Though some members of the Ikhwān are known, it is not easy to work out exactly who, or how many, were part of this group of writers. The members referred to themselves as "sleepers in the cave" (rasā'il 4, p. 18); a hidden intellectual presence. In one passage they give as their reason for hiding their secrets from the people, not a fear of earthly violence, but a desire to protect their God-given gifts from the world (rasā'il 4, p. 166). Yet they were well aware that their esoteric teachings might provoke unrest, and the various calamities suffered by the successors of the Prophet may have seemed good reason to remain hidden.

=== Non-sectarian connection ===
According to professor Nader El-Bizri, many scholars hold the Brethren of Purity to be "free-thinkers" who transcended sectarian divisions and were not bound by the doctrines of any specific creed, thus categorising them as non-sectarian Muslims. Besides founding their views on the Qur'an, the Ikhwan also appealed in their Epistles to the Torah (Tawrat) and the Gospel (Injeel). While it is generally accepted that their literature belonged to a Shi'ite legacy that had strong connections with the Isma'ili tradition, the Ikhwan were also inspired by the works of Pythagoras, Socrates, Plato, Aristotle, Plotinus, Euclid, Ptolemy, Porphyry, and Iamblichus. Their syncretism, as a result, overcame the sectarian discords of their time.

=== Sunni-Sufi connections ===
Among the theories of the origins of the Ikhwān is that they were Sunnis and that their batini teachings were sufi in nature. The Encyclopedia contains hadith narrated by Aisha, which is something Shia scholars would not do. Susanne Diwald asserts that the Encyclopedia is sufi, thus implying a Sunni character. Alessandro Bausani also presented theories of the work being Sunni sufi in nature. The Encyclopedia contains reference to the Rashidun Caliphate, which is associated with Sunni Islam, and also contains a passage in it that denounces the Rafidhi, a slur used to describe the non-Zaydi Shia, including Isma'ilis.

According to Louis Massignon, the Arab scholar ibn Sab'in of al-Andalus asserted that the Encyclopedia has a Sunni sufi orientation. According to Palestinian historian Abdul Latif Tibawi, the Encyclopedia contains a passage that states that if an ideal Imam dies, then the community can still be governed by consensus (ijma), which is a Sunni concept. According to Tibawi, this idea rejects the Imamate in Shia doctrine.

=== Mu'tazilite connections ===
The ontology of the Ikhwan is based on Neo-Platonism, linking ideas to a higher reality than sensory things. In line with the Mu'tazilite, they link human free will with God's justice. As evident from The Case of the Animals versus Man, spiritual entities frequently acknowledged by Muslim beliefs, such as angels, jinn, and spirits, function as figures representing Platonic intellects, showing further resemblance to the Mu'tazilite cosmology.

=== Ismaili Connections ===
Among the Isma'ili groups and missionaries who favored the Encyclopedia, authorship was sometimes ascribed to one or another "Hidden Imam"; this theory is recounted in al-Qifti's biographical compendium of philosophers and doctors, the "Chronicle of the Learned" (Akhbār al-Hukamā or Tabaqāt-al-Hukamā).

Some modern scholars have argued for an Ismaili origin to the writings. Ian Richard Netton writes that: "The Ikhwan's concepts of exegesis of both Quran and Islamic tradition were tinged with the esoterism of the Ismailis." According to Yves Marquet, "It seems indisputable that the Epistles represent the state of Ismaili doctrine at the time of their compositions". Bernard Lewis was more cautious, ranking the Epistles among books which, though "closely related to Ismailism" may not actually have been Ismaili, despite their batini inspiration. Ibn Qifti (d.646/1248), reporting in the 7th/13th century in Taʾrīkh ḥukamāʾ al-islām (p. 82) that, "Opinions differed about the authors of the Epistles. Some people attributed to an Alid Imam, proffering various names, whereas other put forward as author some early Mutazilite theologians."

Among Syrian Ismailis, the earliest reference to the Encyclopedia and its relation with the Ismailis is given in the Kitab Fusul wa'l Akhbar by Nurudin bin Ahmad (d. 233/849). Another important work, Al-Usul wa'l-Ahkam by Abu l-Ma'ali Hatim bin Imran bin Zuhra (d. 498/1104), writes that, "These da'is, and other da'is with them, collaborated in composing long Epistles, fifty-two in number, on various branches of learning." It implies the Epistles being the product of the joint efforts of the Ismaili da'is.

Among the Yemenite traces, the earliest reference of the Epistles is found in the fragments of "Sirat Ibn Hawshab" by Ja'far ibn Mansur al-Yaman, who writes: "He (Imam Wafi Ahmed) 8th Imam of Ismaili sect went through many a difficulty and fear and the destruction of his family, whose description cannot be lengthier, until he issued (ansa'a) the Epistles and was contacted by a man called Abu Gafir from among his dais. He charged him with the mission as was necessary and asked him to keep his identity concealed." This source not only asserts the connection of the Epistles with the Ismailis, but also indicates that the Imam himself was not the sole author (sahibor mu'allif), but only the issuer or presenter (al-munsi). It suggests that the text of the philosophical deliberations was given a final touching by the Imam, and the approved text was delivered to Abu Gafir to be forwarded possibly to the Ikhwan in Basra secretly. Since the orthodox circles and the ruling power had portrayed a wrong image of Ismailism, the names of the (six) compilers were concealed.

Notwithstanding the uncertainties in the source, the prominent members of the secret association seem to have included Abul Hasan al-Tirmizi, Abdullah bin Mubarak, Abdullah bin Hamdan, Abdullah bin Maymun, Sa'id bin Hussain. The other Yemenite source connecting the Epistles with the Ismailis was the writing of the Tayyibi Isma'ili Da'i al-Mutlaq Ibrahim ibn al-Husayn al-Hamidi (d. 557/1162), who wrote Kanz al-Walad. After him, there followed Al-Anwar al-Latifa by Muhammad ibn Tahir (d. 584/1188), Tanbih al-Ghafilin by Hatim ibn Ibrahim (d. 596/1199), Damigh al-Batil wa hatf ul-Munaazil by Ali ibn Muhammad ibn al-Walid al-Anf (d. 612/1215), "Risalat al-Waheeda" by al-Hussayn ibn Ali (d. 667/1268) and Uyun al-Akhbar by Idris Imad al-Din (d. 872/1468) etc.

=== al-Tawhīdī ===
Al-Qifti, however, denigrates this account and instead turns to a comment he discovered, written by Abū Hayyān al-Tawhīdī (d. 1023) in his Kitāb al-Imtā' wa'l-Mu'ānasa (written between 983 and 985), a collection of 37 séances at the court of Ibn Sa'dān, vizier of the Buyid ruler Samsam al-Dawla. Apparently, al-Tawhīdī was close to Zaid ibn Rifa'a, praising his intellect, ability and deep knowledge – indeed, he had dedicated his Kitāb as-Sadiq wa 'l-Sadaqa to Zaid – but he was disappointed that Zaid was not orthodox or consistent in his beliefs, and that he was, as Samuel Miklos Stern puts it,

...frequenting the society of the heretical authors of the Rasa'il Ikhwan as-Safa, whose names are also recorded as follows: Abu Sulaiman Muhammed b. Ma'shar al-Bisti al-Maqdisi, Abu'l-Hasan 'Ali b. Harun az-Zanjani and Abu Ahmad al-Mihrajani, and al-'Aufi. At-Tauhidi also reports in this connection the opinion expressed by Abu Sulaiman al-Mantiqi, his master, on the Rasa'il and an argument between a certain al-Hariri, another pupil of al-Mantiqi, and Abu Sulaiman al-Maqdisi about the respective roles of Revelation and Philosophy.

For many years, this was the only account of the authors' identities, but al-Tawhīdī's comments were second-hand evidence and so unsatisfactory; further, the account is incomplete, as Abu Hayyan mentions that there were others besides these 4.

This situation lasted until al-Tawhīdī's Kitāb al-Imtā' wa'l-Mu'ānasa was published in 1942. This publication substantially supported al-Qifti's work, although al-Qifti apparently toned down the description and prominence of al-Tawhīdī's charges that the Brethren were Batiniyya, an esoteric Ismaili sect and thus heretics, possibly so as to not tar his friend Zaid with the same brush.

Stern derives a further result from the published text of the Kitāb al-Imtā wa 'l-Mu'anasa, pointing out that a story al-Tawhīdī ascribes to a personal meeting with Qadi Abu'l-Hasan 'Alī b. Hārūn az-Zanjāni, the founder of the group, appears in almost identical form in one of the epistles. While neat, Stern's view of things has been challenged by Tibawi, who points out some assumptions and errors Stern has made, such as the relationship between the story in al-Tawhīdī's work and the Epistles; Tibawi points out the possibility that the story was instead taken from a third, independent and prior source.

Al-Tawhīdī's testimony has also been described as thus:

The Ikhwan al-Safa' remain an anonymous group of scholars, but when Abu Hayyan al-Tawhīdī was asked about them, he identified some of them: Abu Sulayman al-Busti (known as al-Muqaddasi), 'Ali b. Harun al-Zanjani, Muhammad al-Nahrajuri (or al-Mihrajani), al-'Awfi, and Zayd ibn Rifa'i.

The last contemporary source comes from the surviving portions of the Kitāb Siwan al-Hikma (c. 950) by Abu Sulaiman al-Mantiqi (al-Tawhīdī's teacher; 912–985), which was a sort of compendium of biographies; al-Mantiqi is primarily interested in the Brethren's literary techniques of using parables and stories, and so he says only this little before proceeding to give some extracts of the Encyclopedia:

Abū Sulaimān al-Maqdisī: He is the author of the fifty-two Epistles inscribed The Epistles of the Sincere Brethren; all of them are full with Ethics and the science of... They are current among people, and are widely read. I wish to quote here a few paragraphs in order to give an idea of the manner of their parables, thus bringing my book to an end.

al-Maqdisī was previously listed in the Basra group of al-Tawhīdī; here Stern and Hamdani differ, with Stern quoting Mantiqi as crediting Maqdisi with 52 epistles, but Hamdani says "By the time of al-Manṭiqī, the Rasā'īl were almost complete (he mentions 51 tracts)."

The second near-contemporary record is another comment by Shahrazūrī as recorded in the Tawārikh al-Hukamā or alternatively, the Tawárykh al-Hokamá; specifically, it is from the Nuzhat al-arwah, which is contained in the Tawārikh, which states:

Abū Solaymán Mah. b. Mosh'ir b. Nasby, who is known by the name of Moqadisy, and Abú al-Hasan b. Zahrún Ryhány, and Abú Ahmad Nahrajúry, and al-'Aufy, and Zayd b. Rofá'ah are the philosophers who compiled the memoirs of the Ikhwán al-cafâ, which have been recorded by Moqaddisy.

Hamdani disputes the general abovegoing identifications, pointing out that accounts differ in multiple details, such as whether Zayd was an author or not, whether there was a principal author, and who was in the group or not. He lays particular stress on quotes from the Encyclopedia dating between 954 and 960 in the anonymous (Pseudo-Majriti) work Ghāyat al-Hakīm; al-Maqdisi and al-Zanjani are known to have been active in 983, He finds it implausible they would have written or edited "so large an encyclopedia at least twenty-five to thirty years earlier, that is, around 343/954 to 348/960, when they would have been very young." He explains the al-Tawhidi narrative as being motivated by contemporary politics and issues of hereticism relating to the Qarmatians, and points out that there is proof that Abu Hayyan has fabricated other messages and information.

Aloys Sprenger mentions this in a footnote:

Since I wrote the first part of this notice I found one of the authors of these memoirs mentioned in the following terms: 'Zayd b. Rofa, one of the authors of the Ikhwan al safa, was extremely ignorant in tradition, and he was a liar without shame.'"

== The Epistles of the Brethren of Purity ==
The Rasā’il Ikhwān aṣ-Ṣafāʾ (Epistles of the Brethren of Purity) consist of fifty-two treatises in mathematics, natural sciences, psychology (psychical sciences) and theology. The first part, which is on mathematics, groups fourteen epistles that include treatises in arithmetic, geometry, astronomy, geography, and music, along with tracts in elementary logic, inclusive of: the Isagoge, the Categories, De Interpretatione, the Prior Analytics and the Posterior Analytics. The second part, which is on natural sciences, gathers seventeen epistles on matter and form, generation and corruption, metallurgy, meteorology, a study of the essence of nature, the classes of plants and animals, including a fable. The third part, which is on psychology, comprises ten epistles on the psychical and intellective sciences, dealing with the nature of the intellect and the intelligible, the symbolism of temporal cycles, the mystical essence of love, resurrection, causes and effects, definitions and descriptions. The fourth part deals with theology in eleven epistles, investigating the varieties of religious sects, the virtue of the companionship of the Brethren of Purity, the properties of genuine belief, the nature of the Divine Law, the species of politics, and the essence of magic.

They define a 'perfect man' in the Encyclopedia:

of East Persian derivation, of Arabic faith, of Iraqi, that is Babylonian, in education, Hebrew in astuteness, a disciple of Christ in conduct, as pious as a Syrian monk, a Greek in natural sciences, an Indian in the interpretation of mysteries and, above all a Sufi or a mystic in his whole spiritual outlook.

There are debates on using this description and other materials of the Encyclopedia help determine the identity, affiliation, and other characteristics of the Brethren.

== Notes ==
=== References ===
- 1998 edition of The Routledge Encyclopedia of Philosophy; ed. Edward Craig, ISBN 0-415-18709-5
- Nasr, Seyyed Hossein (1964). An Introduction to Islamic Cosmological Doctrines: Conceptions of nature and methods used for its study by the Ihwan Al-Safa, Al-Biruni, and Ibn Sina. Belknap Press of Harvard University Press. LCCN 64-13430. OCLC 352677.
- Lane-Poole, Stanley (1883). Studies in a Mosque (1st ed.). Khayat Book & Publishing Company S.A.L.
- Netton, Ian Richard (1991). Muslim Neoplatonists: An Introduction to the Thought of the Brethren of Purity (1st ed.). Edinburgh University Press. ISBN 0-7486-0251-8.
- "The authorship of the Epistles of the Ikhwan-as-Safa", by Samuel Miklos Stern, published by Islamic Culture of Hyderabad in 1947
- "Abū Ḥayyan Al-Tawḥīdī and The Brethren of Purity", Abbas Hamdani. International Journal of Middle East Studies, 9 (1978), 345–353
- El-Bizri, Nader (2008). Epistles of the Brethren of Purity. Ikhwan al-Safa' and their Rasa'il (1st ed.). Oxford University Press. ISBN 978-0-19-955724-0.
- El-Bizri, Nader (2014) «Ikhwān al-Ṣafāʾ: An Islamic Philosophical Fraternity », in Houari Touati (ed.), Encyclopedia of Mediterranean Humanism.
