= Friedrich Dieterici =

German orientalist and historian

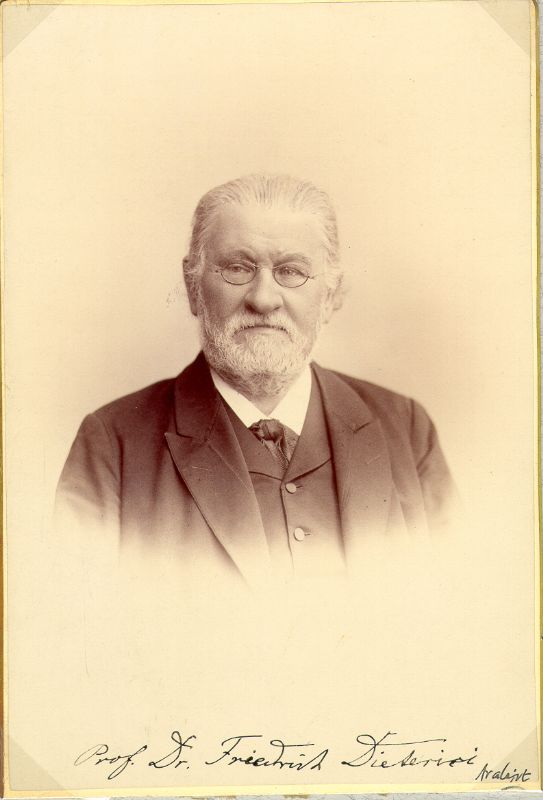
- Friedrich Dieterici.
- Born: 6 July 1821; Berlin
- Died: 18 August 1903 (aged 82); Berlin

Friedrich Heinrich Dieterici (6 July 1821 in Berlin – 18 August 1903 in Berlin) was a German orientalist and historian.

== Biography ==
He studied at the universities of Halle and Berlin, traveled extensively in the East, and in 1850 was appointed associate professor of Arabic literature at the University of Berlin.

He won particular distinction by his researches in the Arabic language and literature. A lengthy list of his published works include:

- Ibn 'Akîl's Commentar zur Alfijja des Ibn Mâlik, (1852) – Ibn Aqil's commentary on the Alfijja of Ibn Maalik.
- Mutanabbii Carmina cum commentario Wahidii, (1861).
- Die Logik und Psychologie der Araber im zehnten Jarhhundert nach Christus, (1868) – The logic and psychology of the Arabs in the 10th century.
- Die philosophie der Araber im X. jahrhundert nach Christus, (1876), – The philosophy of the Arabs in the 10th century.
- Die Abhandlungen der Ichwân Es-Safâ in Auswahl (1886) – The memoirs of the Ikhwan as-Safa (selection).

As language study aids, he published Chrestomathie Ottoman (1854, Ottoman chrestomathy) and Arabisch-Deutsches Handwörterbuch zum Koran und Thier und Mensch vor dem König der Genien (1894, Arabic-German concise dictionary of the Quran).

In later years, he focused his energies in the field of Arabic philosophy, translating the philosophical and psychological works of Al-Farabi into German. He also made the treatises of the Ikhwan as-Safa (10th century secret philosophic society) accessible (1883–86). In 1882 he published Die sogenannte Theologie des Aristoteles : aus arabischen Handschriften ("Aristotle's so-called theology from Arab manuscripts").
