= Abdul Latif Tibawi =

Palestinian historian

Abdul Latif Tibawi (Arabic: عبد اللطيف الطيباوي) (1910-October 16, 1981) was a Palestinian historian and educator.

== Biography ==
Abdul Latif Tibawi was a Palestinian historian and educator. He was born in 1910 in Tayibe and attended Tulkarm High School. During his studies in 1925, he won a prize for best article in Al-Hilal magazine. In 1929, he obtained a BA in History and Arabic Literature from the American University of Beirut (AUB) . He was District Inspector in Jaffa, Lydda and Gaza from 1935 to 1941 and in 1948, he received his PhD in Philosophy from the University of London, the same year as the Nakba. Between 1960 and 1963, he researched at Harvard and prepared his work titled American Interests in Syria 1800-1901. He won the Monroe Award for his study titled, The Islamic Pious Foundations in Jerusalem (1969). He was appointed professor of Islamic education at the Institute of Education, University of London, and remained in this position until his retirement in 1977.

He taught at the University of London and Harvard and published numerous books and articles in history, literature and education in both English and Arabic. His work is often seen as part of a broader intellectual resistance to British imperial narratives about Palestine and the Arab world and has been translated into Arabic, Persian, French, German and Italian.

Tibawi was appointed Lecturer in Comparative Education at the Institute of Education (IOE) at University College London (UCL) and retired in 1977. After his retirement, many of his friends including Dr. Habibulhak Nadwi, published writings dedicated to him, titled Arabic and Islamic Garland, which contained more than thirty articles by various scholars from many countries of the world. Before his death, Tibawi established a fund for Palestinian postgraduate students at the School of Oriental and African Studies.

Among the more than fifty articles he published in various newspapers and journals in the last twenty years of his life, two are particularly important. In Critiques of English Speaking Orientalists and their Approach to Islam and the Arabs and On the Orientalists Again, Tibawi criticized the views of Orientalism on Islam and criticized Alfred Guillaume for his English translation of Muslim historiographer Ibn Ishaq’s work, The Life of Muhammad (London 1955). He was also critical of historians like R. B. Sergeant and B. Lewis on various issues.

On October 16, 1981, Abdul Latif Tibawi died in a car accident in London.

== Select bibliography ==
- Tibawi, Abdul Latif. ''Arab Education in Mandatory Palestine.'' London: Luzac, 1956.
- Tibawi, Abdul Latif. ''American Interests in Syria, 1800–1901.'' Oxford: Clarendon Press, 1966.
- Tibawi, Abdul Latif. ''British Interests in Palestine, 1800–1901.'' Oxford: Oxford University Press, 1961.
- Tibawi, Abdul Latif. ''Jerusalem: Its Place in Islam and Arab History.'' Beirut: Institute for Palestinian Studies, 1969.
- Tibawi, Abdul Latif. ''A Modern History of Syria, Including Lebanon and Palestine.'' London: Macmillan; New York: St. Martin's Press, 1969.
- Tibawi, Abdul Latif. ''Islamic Education: Its Traditions and Modernization into the Arab National Systems.'' London: Luzac, 1972.
- Tibawi, Abdul Latif. ''Anglo-Arab Relations and the Question of Palestine, 1914–1921.'' London: Luzac, 1977.
- ''Arabic and Islamic Garland: Historical, Educational and Literary Papers Presented to Abdul-Latif Tibawi.'' United Kingdom: Islamic Cultural Centre, 1977.
- Tibawi, Abdul Latif. ''The Islamic Pious Foundations in Jerusalem: Origins, History and Usurpation by Israel.'' London, 1978.
