= Al-Mubarrad =

Abbasid philologist, biographer and grammarian (826-898)

Abū al-‘Abbās Muḥammad ibn Yazīd
- أبو العباس محمد بن يزيد
- Born: c. 826 (207 AH); Basra, Abbasid Caliphate
- Died: 898–899 (285 AH); Baghdad, Abbasid Caliphate
- Other name: al-Mubarrad
- Occupation: Grammarian of Basra
- Era: Islamic Golden Age

Al-Mubarrad (المبرد) (Note: Beatty MS of Al-Fihrist gives al-Mubarrid, but in most of the translation the usual spelling, al-Mubarrad is used. Al-Māzinī nicknamed him “Mubarrid” (meaning “cool-headed in establishing the truth"), but the scholars of al-Kūfah changed it to Mubarrad (“chilly”), the name by which the grammarian is known.) (al-Mobarrad), or Abū al-‘Abbās Muḥammad ibn Yazīd (c. 826 – c. 898), was a native of Baṣrah. He was a philologist, biographer and a leading grammarian of the School of Basra, a rival to the School of Kufa. In 860 he was called to the court of the Abbasid caliph al-Mutawakkil at Samarra. When the caliph was killed the following year, he went to Baghdād, and taught there until his death.

A prolific writer, perhaps the greatest of his school, his best known work is Al-Kāmil ("The Perfect One" or "The Complete").

A leading scholar of Sībawayh's seminal treatise on grammar, "al-Kitab" ("The Book"), he lectured on philology and wrote critical treatises on linguistics and Quranic exegesis (tafsir). He is said to be the source of the story of Shahrbanu or Shahr Banu –eldest daughter of Yazdegerd III– as the wife Husayn ibn Ali and mother of Ali al-Sajjad.

His quote to would-be students was:

Have you ridden through grammar, appreciating its vastness and meeting with the difficulties of its contents?

== Biography ==
Ishaq Al-Nadīm transmitted the written account of Abū al-Ḥusayn al-Khazzāz, who gives al-Mubarrad's full genealogical name: Muḥammad ibn Yazīd ibn ‘Abd al-Akbar ibn ‘Umayr ibn Ḥasanān ibn Sulaym ibn Sa‘d ibn ‘Abd Allāh ibn Durayd ibn Mālik ibn al-Ḥārith ibn ‘Āmir ibn Abd Allāh ibn Bilāl ibn ‘Awf ibn Aslam ibn Aḥjan ibn Ka‘b ibn al-Ḥarīth ibn Ka‘b ibn ‘Abd Allāh ibn Mālik ibn Naṣr ibn al-Azd, al-Azd said to be the son of al-Ghawth.

According to Sheikh Abū Sa‘īd al-Sīrāfī, Abū al-‘Abbās Muḥammad ibn Yazīd al-Azdī al-Thumālī [al-Mubarrad] was a protégé of the grammarians al-Jarmī, al-Māzinī, etc. He was descended from a branch of al-Azd, called the Thumālah. (Note: See Durayd, Geneal., p. 288) He began studying Sībawayh's Book with al-Jarmī, but completed it with al-Māzinī, whose linguistic theories he developed. In a citation from the book called Device of the Men of Letters, al-Hakimi wrote that Abū ‘Abd Allah Muhammad ibn al-Qāsim called Al-Mubarrad a "Sūraḥūn", (Note: Shahrastānī, Baghdādī, Mas‘udi and others do not mention the Sūraḥūn sect, who were probably local to al-Baṣrah. The Beatty MS, (followed in the Dodge English translation of Al-Fihrist), suggests the Sūraḥūn were sweepers.) of al-Baṣrah. His origins were in al-Yaman, however his marriage to a daughter of al-Ḥafṣā al-Mughannī (Note: Al-Ḥafṣā al-Mughannī was a “sharīf”, or noble, of Yemen.) earned him the name ‘Ḥayyan al-Sūraḥī.’

Abū Sa’īd reports al-Sarrāj and Abū ‘Ali al-Ṣaffār that al-Mubarrad was born in 825-26 (210 AH)and died in 898-99 (285 AH), aged seventy-nine. Others said his birth was in 822-23 (207 AH). Al-Ṣūlī Abū Bakr Muhammad ibn Yahya said he was buried in the cemetery of the Kūfah Gate.

Al-Mubarrad related many anecdotes of the poets, linguists and satirists of his circle. In one such tale al-Mubarrad says

One day Abū Muḥallim al-Shaybānī said to me, ‘I had never seen a mortar among the nomads, so that when I came across one, I was disdainful of it.

He estimated that “Abū Zayd knew a great deal about grammar, but less than al-Khalīl and Sībawayh." He described al-Aṣma’ī as "equal to Abu ‘Ubaydah in poetry and rhetoric but more expert in grammar, although ‘Ubaydah excelled in genealogy."

In another tradition al-Mubarrad read a poem of the poet Jarīr to a student of al-Aṣma‘ī and Abū ‘Ubaydah, called al-Tawwazī, in the presence of the poet’s great grandson Umārah, which began:

The dove was happy in the trees exciting me;
For a long time may thou tarry in the branches and the forest verdure,

until he came to the line

But the heart remaineth bound by longing
For Jumanah or Rayya, the Barren Place (al-‘Āqir).

When ‘Umārah asked al-Tawwazī how his master Abū ‘Ubaydah would interpret “Jumanah and Rayyā”, al-Tawwazī replied, “The names of two women,” ‘Umārah laughed saying, ‘These two, by Allāh, are two sandy places to the right and left of my house!' When al-Tawwazi asked al-Mubarrad to write this explanation down, he refused out of respect for Abū ‘Ubaydah. Al-Tawwazī insisted that if he were present, Abū ‘Ubaydah, would accept Umārah’s interpretation, as it was about his own house.’ (Note: As a great grandson of the poet Jarīr, ‘Umārah was brought up in the old family home and probably knew all about Jumānah and Rayyā al-‘Āqir. See Jarīr, Sharḥ Dīwān, pp. 304)

== Works ==
- Meaning of the Qur’ān; (Note: This book about meaning of the Qur’an, Its Ambiguity and Metaphor is not mentioned in the Beatty MS.)
- Al-Kāmil (The Complete) (Note: Recent Arabic editions of this famous book have been published by Dār al—Kutub and Maktabat Nahḍat Miṣr in Cairo, and there is also the older edition put out by Kreysing of Leipzig in 1864.)
- The Garden;
- Improvisation;
- Etymology;
- Al-Anwā' and the Seasons;
- Al-Qawāfī;
- Penmanship and Spelling;
- Introduction to Sībawayh;
- The Shortened and the Lengthened Masculine and Feminine;
- The Meaning of the Qur’ān, known as Kitāb al-Tāmm (Entirety);
- Proving the Readings [methods of reading the Qur’ān];
- Explanation of the Arguments of the “Book" of Sībawayh;
- Necessity of Poetry;
- The Training of an Examiner; (Note: This probably refers to a scholar trained to examine old poems and tribal vernaculars.)
- The Letters in the Meaning of the Qur’an to “Ṭā' (Ṭ) Ha‘(H); (Note: Ṭā’ hā’ are the letters which begin Sūrah 20.)
- The Meaning of the Attributes of Allāh, May His Name Be Glorified;
- Praiseworthy and Vile;
- Pleasing Gardens;
- Names of the Calamities among the Arabs;
- The Compendium (unfinished);
- Consolation;
- Embellishment;
- Thorough Searching of the “Book” of Sībawayh; (Note: The word used in the Beatty MS seems to be qa’r ( thorough searching") followed in the translation, although Flügel gives the word as ma‘na (“meaning’).)
- Thorough Searching of “Kitab al-Awsaṭ" of al-Akhfash; (Note: For Kitāb al-Awsīṭ fī aI-Naḥw of al-Akhfash (the Middle) see Yaqut.)
- Prosody- An Explanation of the Words of the Arabs, Rescuing Their Pronunciation, Coupling of Their Words, and Relating Their Meaning;
- How the Pronunciations of the Qur’ān Agree, Though Their Meanings Differ;
- The Generations of the Grammarians of al-Baṣrah, with Accounts about Them;
- The Complete Epistle; (Note: This title and those following are in the Flügel edition but not in the Beatty MS.)
- Refutation of Sībawayh The Principles of Poetry;
- Inflection (Declension) of the Qur’ān;
- Exhortation for Morality and Truth;
- Qaḥṭān and ‘Adnan [the basic Arab tribes];
- The Excess Deleted from Sībawayh;
- Introduction to Grammar;
- Inflection (Declension);
- The Speaker (The Rational Being);
- Superior and Distinguished; (Note: This is perhaps a misprint, meant to be instead the grammatical forms Al- Fā’il wa-al-Maf’ūl.)

Explanation of the Names of Allah the Almighty;

- The Letters;
- Declension (Conjugation).

== Transcribers of al-Mubarrad (Note: The word translated as “transcribers” is an unusual form but it probably refers to the two men mentioned in the first phrase, who copied al—Mubarrad’s manuscripts. The other persons mentioned under this heading were not transcribers.) ==
The copyists Ismā’īl ibn Aḥmad Ibn al-Zajjājī and Ibrāhīm ibn Muḥammad al-Shāshī were probably al-Mubarrad’s amanuenses.

Other contemporary grammarians wrote commentaries of lesser value on The Book of Sībawayh. (Note: Al-Nadim lists Al-Kāmil first of al-Mubarrad's books.) Among this group were: Abū Dhakwān al-Qāsim ibn Ismā’īl, who wrote “The Meaning of Poetry”; Abū Dhakwān’s stepson Al-Tawwazī. ‘Ubayd ibn Dhakwān Abū ‘Ali, among whose books there were Contraries, (Note: This title is not included in the Beatty MS. On the margin the following note is inserted: “Abū Bakr Muḥammad ibn al-Ḥasan ibn Marwān quoted through Abū Dhakwān the book Opposites from al-Tawwazī." This evidently refers to Kitāb al-Aḍdād of al-Tawwazī.)Reply of the Silencer, Oaths (Divisions) of the Arabians, Abū Ya‘lā ibn Abī Zur‘ah, a friend of al-Māzinī, who wrote A Compendium of Grammar (unfinished)

Al-Mubarrad‘s leading pupil al-Zajjāj became an associate of al-Qāsim, the vizier of the ‘Abbāsid caliph al-Mu‘taḍid (892-902), and tutor to the caliph’s children. When al-Mu’taḍid was recommended the book Compendium of Speech by Muḥammad ibn Yaḥyā ibn Abi ‘Abbād, (Note: Muḥammad ibn Yaḥyā ibn Abi ‘Abbād Abū Ja‘far, was Maḥbarah al-Nadīm or Abū ‘Abbād Jābir ibn Zayd ibn al- Ṣabbāḥ al-‘Askarī) which was composed in the form of tables, the caliph ordered his vizier, al-Qāsim, (Note: It is unclear to whom the pronouns refer, but it seems logical to interpret the passage as translated.) to commission an expositionary commentary. Al-Qāsim sent first to Tha‘lab, who declined -offering instead to work on Kitāb al-‘Ayn of al-Khalīl- and then to al-Mubarrad, who in turn declined on grounds of age. Al-Mubarrad recommended his younger colleague al-Zajjāj for such a laborious task. Al-Mubarrad had a close friendship with Ibn al-Sarrāj, one of his brightest and sharpest pupils. When al-Mubarrad died al-Sarrāj became a pupil of al-Zajjāj. Al Mubarrad taught Abū Muḥammad ‘Abd Allah ibn Muhammad ibn Durustūyah. and Abū al-Ḥasan ‘Alī ibn ‘lsā al-Rummānī, wrote a commentary on the “Introduction" (Al-Madkhal) (on grammar) of al-Mubarrad. Ibn al-Ḥā’ik Hārūn, from al-Ḥīrah, a grammarian of al-Kūfah, debated with al-Mubarrad. A conversation between al-Mubarrad and Ibn al-Ḥā’ik is related by al-Nadīm were al-Mubarrad says to Ibn al-Ḥā’ik, “I notice that you are full of understanding, but at the same time free from pride." Ibn al-Ḥā’ik replied, “Oh, Abū al-‘Abbas, it is because of you that Allāh has provided our bread and livelihood.” Then al-Mubarrad said, “In spite of receiving your bread and livelihood, you would be proud if you had a proud nature." (Note: Al-Mubarrad evidently cared for Hārūn as an apprentice before Hārūn studied with Tha‘lab.)

Al-Nadīm also relates a tradition from Abū ‘Ubayd Allāh (Note: Abū ‘Ubayd Allāh was evidently a friend of the author of Al-Fihrist.) that Muḥammad ibn Muḥammad had related that Abū al-‘Abbas Muhammad ibn Yazid [al-Mubarrad] the grammarian (Note: Muḥammad ibn Muḥammad may have been a son of al-Mubarrad.) had said: “I never saw anyone more avaricious for learning than al-Jāḥiẓ, al-Fatḥ ibn Khāqān, and Ismā’īl ibn Isḥaq al-Qāḍī (Judge). Whatever book came into the hands of al-Jāḥīẓ, he read it from cover to cover, while al-Fatḥ carried a book in his slipper and if he left the presence of Caliph al-Mutawakkil to relieve himself or to pray, he read the book as he walked and returned to his seat. As for Ismā’īl ibn Isḥaq, whenever I went in to him there was in his hand a book which he was reading, or else he was turning over some books so as to choose one of them to read. (Note: The same anecdote is told at Dodge, Chap. III, sect. 2, near n. 12.)

== Bibliography ==
- Flügel, Gustav (1862). Die grammatischen Schulen der Araber. Leipzig: Brockhaus.
- Flügel, Gustav (1872). J. Roediger; A. Mueller (eds.). Al-Fihrist (in Arabic). Vol. II. Leipzig: F.C.W. Vogel. p. 663.
- Iṣbahānī (Ibn), Abū al-Faraj ‘Alī ibn al-Ḥusayn (1888) [1868]. Kitāb al-Aghānī (in Arabic). Vol. 20. Cairo: Būlāq Press.
- Iṣbahānī (Ibn) (1888). Kitāb al-Aghānī (in Arabic). Vol. 21. Leiden: Brill.
- Iṣbahānī (Ibn) (1900). Tables Alphabétiques. Leiden: Brill.
- Jāḥiẓ (al-), Abū Uthmān ‘Amr ibn Baḥr (1950) [1948]. Hārūn, ’Abd al-Salām Muḥammad (ed.). Kitāb al-Bayān wa-al-Tabyīn. Vol. 4. Cairo: Lajna al-Ta’līf wa-al-Tarjamah wa-al-Nashr.
- Jāḥiẓ (al-), Abū Uthmān ‘Amr ibn Baḥr (1955). Pellat, Charles (ed.). Kitāb al-Qawl fī al-Bighā (Le Livre des mulets). Cairo: Al-Ḥalabī Press.
- Kaḥḥālah, ‘Umar Riḍā (1959). A'lām al-Nisā'. Vol. 3. Damascus: Al-Hāshimī Press.
- Ḥājj Khalīfah (1858). Kashf al-Zunun (Lexicon Bibliographicum et Encyclopaedicum) (in Arabic and Latin). Vol. I. Translated by Flugel, Gustav. London: Bentley. p. 173.
- Khallikān (Ibn), Aḥmad ibn Muḥammad (1868) [1843]. Ibn Khallikan's Biographical Dictionary (Wafayāt al-A'yān wa-Anbā Abnā' al-Zamān). Vol. III. London: W.H. Allen. p. 31.
- Khallikān (Ibn), Aḥmad ibn Muḥammad (1871) [1843]. Ibn Khallikan's Biographical Dictionary. Vol. IV. London: W.H. Allen.
- Miskawayh, Abū ‘Alī Aḥmad ibn Muḥammad; Ibn al-Ḥusayn al-Rudhrawarī Abū Shujā’, Muḥammad; Abū al-Ḥasan al-Hilāl ibn Muḥassin al-Ṣābī (1921) [1920]. Kitāb Tajārub al-Umarā' -The Eclipse of the 'Abbāsid Caliphate (in Arabic and English). Vol. 6. Translated by Margoliouth, David Samuel; Amedroz, H. F. London: Basil Blackwell.
- Thatcher, Griffithes Wheeler (1911). "Mubarrad" . In Chisholm, Hugh (ed.). Encyclopædia Britannica. Vol. 18 (11th ed.). Cambridge University Press. p. 954.
- Mubarrad, Muḥammad ibn Yazīd (1869) [1864]. Wright, William (ed.). Al-Kamil. Leipzig & Constantinople.
- Mubarrad, Muḥammad ibn Yazīd (1986). Dali, Muhammad (ed.). Al-Kamil. Beirut.
- Mubarrad (al-), Abu al-'Abbas Muhammad ibn Yazid (1898). Brockelmann, Carl (ed.). Al-Kamil (manuscript). Vol. I. Weimar: Geschichte der arabischen Litteratur. p. 109.
- Mubarrad, Muḥammad ibn Yazīd (1891). Al-Kamil. Cairo.
- Mubarrad, Muḥammad ibn Yazīd (1864), Wright, William (ed.), Kitāb al-kāmil, Princeton University Arabic collection, Leipzig: Kreysing, OCLC 780050572
- Mubarrad, Muḥammad ibn Yazīd (1892), Wright, William (ed.), The Kāmil of El-Mubarrad, edited for The German Oriental Society (in English and Arabic), vol. II, Leipzig: G. Kreysing
- Mas'ūdī (al-), Abū al-Ḥasan ‘Alī ibn al-Ḥusayn (1871). Kitāb Murūj al-Dhahab wa-Ma'ādin al-Jawhar (Les Prairies d'or) (in Arabic and French). Vol. VI. Translated by Meynard, C Barbier de; Courteille, Pavet de. Paris: Imprimerie nationale. pp. 302, 319.
- Nadīm (al-), Isḥāq (1970). Dodge, Bayard (ed.). The Fihrist of al-Nadim, A Tenth-Century Survey of Muslim Culture. Vol. 1. New York & London: Columbia University Press.
- Nawawī (al-), Abū Zakarīyā Yaḥyā (1847) [1842]. Wüstenfeld, Ferdinand (ed.). Kitāb Tahdhīb al-Asmā' (The Biographical Dictionary of Illustrious Men). Göttingen: London Society for the Publication of Oriental Texts.
- Suyūtī (al-), Jalāl al-Dīn ‘Abd al-Raḥmān (1909). Bughyat al-Wu'āt fī Ṭabaqāt al-Lughawīyī wa-al-Nuḥāh (in Arabic). Cairo: Sa’ādah Press.
- Ṭabarī (al-), Muḥammad ibn Jarīr (1901). de Goeje, M. J. (ed.). Ta'rīkh al-Rusul wa-al-Mulūk (Annales). Vol. 14. Leiden: Brill.
- Ṭabarī (al-) (1960). Abū al-Faḍl Ibrāhīm (ed.). Ta'rīkh al-Rusul wa-al-Mulūk (Annales) (in Arabic). Vol. 7. Cairo: Dār al-Ma’ārif.
- Ṭabarī (al-) (1987), Montgomery Watt (ed.), The History of Al-Ṭabarī, an annotated translation, Suny Series in Near Eastern Studies, vol. 7, Albany: State University of New York Press
- Ṭaghrī-Birdī (Ibn), Abū al-Maḥāsin Yūsuf (1956) [1929]. Popper, William (ed.). Al Nujūm al-Zāhirah fī Mulūk Miṣr wa-al-Qāhirah. Vol. 12. Cairo: Dār al-Kutub al-Miṣrīyah.
- Yāqūt, Shīhāb al-Dīn ibn ‘Abd Allāh al-Ḥamawī (1927) [1907]. David Samuel Margoliouth, David Samuel (ed.). Irshād al-Arīb alā Ma'rifat al-Adīb (Yaqut's Dictionary of Learned Men). Vol. III. Leiden: Brill.
- Yāqūt, Shīhāb al-Dīn ibn ‘Abd Allāh al-Ḥamawī (1970) [1966]. Wüstenfeld, Ferdinand (ed.). Mu'jam al-Buldān (Jaqut's Geographischees Wörterbuch). Vol. 6. Leipzig: Brockhaus.
- Yāqūt, Shīhāb al-Dīn ibn ‘Abd Allāh al-Ḥamawī (1965). Wüstenfeld, Ferdinand (ed.). Mu'jam al-Buldān (Jaqut's Geographischees Wörterbuch, Photographic reproduction). Tehran: Maktabat al-Asadī.
- Ziriklī (al-), Khayr al-Dīn (1959) [1954]. Al-A'lām. Vol. 10 (2 ed.). Cairo.
- Zubaydī (al-), Muḥammad ibn al-Ḥasan (1954). Ibrāhīm, Muḥammad (ed.). Ṭabaqāt al-Naḥwīyīn wa-al-Lughawīyīn. Cairo: Al-Khanjī.
