= Abu al-ʽAbbās Thaʽlab =

Arab grammarian of Abbasid era

Abū al-ʽAbbās Thaʽlab (ابو العباس ثعلب) The Grammarian (النحوي)
- Abū al-ʽAbbās Aḥmad ibn Yaḥyā ibn Zayd ibn Zaiyar Thaʽlab
- Born: 815 October; Baghdād, Abbasid Caliphate
- Died: 2 April 904 (aged 88); Baghdād, Abbasid Caliphate (now Irāq)
- Other names: Aḥmad ibn Yaḥyā ibn Zayd ibn Sayyar Abū al-ʽAbbās Thaʽlab (احمد بن يحيى بن زيد بن سيار ابو العباس ثعلب) (Note: This name is given by Ibn al-Kūfī.) and Abū al-ʽAbbās Aḥmad ibn Yaḥyā Thaʽlab (Note: Name given by Abū ʽAbd Allāh al-Ḥasan ibn ʽAlī ibn Muqlah.)
- Occupations: Scholar of philology and educator
- Years active: Abbāsid Era

Academic background
- Influences: Al-Farraʽ, Al-Kisāʽī and Ibn al-Aʽrābī.

Academic work
- School or tradition: Grammarians of Kufa
- Main interests: Philology, Grammar, Lexicography, etc.
- Influenced: Al-Akhfash al-Aṣghar, Abū Bakr ibn al-Anbārī and Ghulām Thaʽlab

Thaʽlab (ثعلب), whose kunya was Abū al-ʽAbbās Aḥmad ibn Yaḥyā (ابو العباس احمد بن يحيى) (815 – 904) was a renowned authority on grammar, a muhaddith (traditionist), a reciter of poetry, and first scholar of the school of al-Kūfah, and later at Baghdād. He was a keen rival of Al-Mubarrad, the head of the school of al-Baṣrah. Thaʽlab supplied much biographic detail about his contemporary philologists found in the biographical dictionaries produced by later biographers.

== Life ==
Abū al-Abbās Thaʽlab was born in Baghdād and Ibn al-Karāb in his Taʽrīkh ('History') gives his date of birth as October 815 [third month, 200 AH], others give 816 or 819 [201 AH or 204 AH]. Thaʽlab recalled seeing, as a child of four years, the caliph al-Maʽmūn arriving back to the city from Khurāsān in 819/20 (204 AH). The Caliph processed from the Iron gate towards the Palace of al-Ruṣāfah, and the crowds were lined up as far as al-Muṣalla. (Note: Sites in the old city of Baghdād on the West Bank of the Tigris. The Bāb al-Ḥadīd (Iron Gate) was a city gate in Baghdād close to a bridge. The Palace of al-Ruṣāfah was built by the Caliph al-Manṣūr for his son, al-Mahdī, completed in 775. The Muṣallā was a place of religious assembly, while the Bāb al-Shām (Damascus Gate), was the double gate on the west side of al-Manṣūr's Round City.) Thaʽlab remembered clearly the occasion when the caliph raised him up from his father's arms and said, 'This is al-Maʽmūn.'

Thaʽlab was adopted by the military-leader-come-poet Maʽn ibn Zāʽidah, (Note: Maʽn ibn Zāʽidah Abū al-Walīd al-Shaybānī.) of the Banū Shaybān, and became a grammarian, philologist, and traditionist of the Kūfah school.

Thaʽlab recalled his interest in Arabic studies, poetry, and language had begun in 831 (216 AH) at age sixteen and that he had memorised to the letter all of al-Farrāʽs works, including Al-Hudūd, by the age of twenty-five. His primary focus was on grammar, poetry, rhetoric, and Al-Nawadir (Strange Forms). He associated with, and counselled, Ibn al-Aʽrābī for about ten years.

Thaʽlab describes an occasion being at the home of Aḥmad ibn Saʽīd with a group of scholars, amongst whom were al-Sukkarī (Note: Abū Saʽīd al-Ḥasan ibn al-Ḥusayn al-Sukkarī (d.888/9). The name is illegible in the Beatty MS of Al-Fihrist, Flügel correctly gives al-Sukkarī. Loosely translated. Aḥmad ibn Saʽīd was probably Ibn Shāhīn of al-Baṣrah, who like Ibn al-Aʽrābī was older than Thaʽlab.) and Abū al-ʽĀliyah (Note: Abū al-ʽĀliyah al-Ḥasan ibn Mālik al-Shāmī, 9th-century Syrian poet.). Critiquing the meaning of a poem by al-Shammākh, Ibn al-A'rābī and Aḥmad ibn Saʽīd showed surprise at Thaʽlab's confidence.

In another anecdote, related by Abū Bakr Aḥmad ibn Mūsā ibn Mujāhid al-Mukri, Thaʽlab once expressed concern for his soul as a disciple of Abū Zayd Saʽid ibn Aws al-Anṣārī (d.830) and Abū Amr ibn al-ʽAlā (d.770), over the exegetes, traditionists and fuqaha (jurists). Ibn Mujahid then told him of his dream in which Muhammad had sent a message to Thaʽlab that his was the superior science. Abū Abd Allāh al-Rūdbāri interpreted this to mean that the study of oral language is above all the other sciences – tafsir (exegesis), Ḥadīth (tradition), fiqh (Law) – as it perfects and connects these to discourse.

Thaʽlab, was invited but declined to take a commission by the vizier al-Qāsim to write a commentary on the book Compendium of Speech by Maḥbarah al-Nadīm, (Note: Muḥammad ibn Yaḥyā ibn ʽAbī ʽAbbād, Abū Jaʽfar al-Nadīm, a courtier of Al-Muʽtaḍid.) which the caliph Al-Muʽtaḍid had ordered. He offered instead to work on the Kitāb al-ʽAyn of al-Khalīl, and the commission went to Al-Zajjaj.

On 30 March or 6 April 904 (17 or 10 Jumada al-Awwal 291 AH), being quite deaf, he was knocked down by a horse while walking in the street and died the next day. He was buried in the vicinity of his house near the Damascus Gate in Baghdād.

=== Thaʽlab's teachers ===
- Abū Naṣr Aḥmad ibn Ḥātim al-Bāhilī (d. 846)
- Ibn al-Aʽrābī (d. 846)
- Al-Zubayr ibn Bakkār (d. 870)
- Aḥmad ibn Ibrāhīm (Note: The name Aḥmad ibn Ibrāhīm is confused with al-Tirmidhī al-Saghīr in Flügel edition of Al-Fihrist.), Abū al-Ḥasan, a calligrapher grammarian, not an author.

== Works ==
Among his books there were:

- Kitāb al-Muṣūn fī al-Nahw wa-Jaʽalah Hudūdān (كتاب المصون في النحو وجعله حدودا) What is "Precious" (Preserved) in Grammar, which he wrote in the form of definitions (ḥudūd);
- Kitāb Ikhtilāf al-al-Naḥwīyīn (كتاب اختلاف النحوّيين) Points on which grammarians disagree;
- Kitāb Maʻānī al-Qurʼān (كتاب معانى القران) The Meaning of the Qurʽān;
- Kitāb al-Muwaffaqa Mukhtaṣir fī al-Nahw (كتاب الموفّقى مختصر في النحو) The Favoured, an abridgment of grammar;
- Kitāb mā yulaḥan fīhī al-ʽĀmma (كتاب ما يلحن فيه العامّة) Faulty Expressions in popular use;
- Kitāb al-Qirāʽāt (كتاب القراءات) Differences between the Seven Readings of the Qurʽān;
- Kitāb Maʻānī al-Šiʽr (كتاب معانى الشعر) Rare ideas in ancient Arabic poetry;
- Kitāb al-Taṣgīr (كتاب التصغير) Diminutive Nouns;
- Kitāb mā Yanṣarif wa mā lā Yanṣaruf (كتاب ما ينصرف وما لا ينصرف) What Is Declined and What Is Not Declined; Parts of Speech which form or do not form other functions;
- Kitāb mā Yujzā wa mā lā Yujzā (كتاب ما يجْزَى وما لا يجزى) What Is Grammatical and What Is Not Grammatical; Nouns of first declension;
- Kitāb al-Šawādd (كتاب الشواذّ) Exceptions;
- Kitāb al-Amthāl (كتاب الامثال) Similes; Collection of Proverbs;
- Kitāb al-Aiman wa al-Dawahā (كتاب الايمان والدواهى) Oaths and Calamities;
- Kitāb al-Waqf wa al-Ibtidāʽ (كتاب الوقف والابتداء) Start and End of Phrases;
- Kitāb al-Istikhraj al-Alfāz min al-Akhbār (كتاب استخراج الالفاظ من الاخبار) The Derivation of Expressions from Legends (Historical Traditions);
- Kitāb al-Hijāʽ (كتاب الهجاء) Spelling;
- Kitāb al-Awsat Ra'aītah (كتاب الاوسط رأيته) Grammar of medium extent;
- Kitāb Ghuraīb al-Qurʽān Laṭīf (كتاب غريب القرآن لطيف) The Excellent Book of the Strange in the Qurʽān;
- Kitāb al-Masāʽil (كتاب المسائل) Questions discussed;
- Kitāb ḥadd al-Nahw (كتاب حدّ النحو) Definitions of Grammar;
- Kitāb Tafsīr Kalām Ibnat al-Khusa (كتاب تفسير كلام ابنه الخسىّ) Exposition of the Statement of Ibnat al-Khus [Hind]; (Note: Hind bint al-Khus al-Iyādīyah was called al-Faṣāhat and was famous for her poetry and wisdom)
- Kitāb al-Faṣīḥ (كتاب الفصيح) Eloquent Style (ʽthe Pureʽ), on philology; (Note: Title omitted in Beatty MS. The others from Beatty MS and differ from Flügel text.)
- Kitāb al-Tafsīr al-Qurʽān (كتاب التفسير القرآن) Parsing the Qurʽān;
- Kitāb al-Qirāʽāt li-Thaʽlab (كتاب القراءات لثعلب) Al-Qirāʽah of Thaʽlab (Qurʽānic Readings); (Note: Al-Qirāʽah interpretative method of Qurʽānic reading and recital. Circa 900 the viziers Muḥammad ibn ʽAlī ibn Muqlah and ʽAlī Ibn ʽĪsā authorised the methods of the Seven Readers and those of other scholars were deemed illegal. Cf Ibn Khaldūn Muqaddimah II, 440.)

== Legacy ==
Thaʽlab is cited as a source for biographies of the following

Grammarians of Baṣrah - Yūnus ibn Ḥabīb, Sībawayh Abū ʽUbaydah, al-Aṣmaʽī, Al-Athram, (Note: Al-Athram was a disciple of al-Aṣmaʽī and Abū ʽUbaydah.)
Grammarians of Kufa - al-Ruʽāsī, Al-Zajjāj who wrote the commentary of the Compendium of Speech.

=== Thaʽlab's disciples ===
Abū al-ʽAbbās Thaʽlab dictated his discourses on grammar, language, historical traditions, the tafsir (Qurʽānic exegesis), and poetry to his pupils who transmitted his works. Among these were:

=== Pupils ===
- Ibn Miqsam (ابن مقسم) (Note: Ibn Miqsam, Abū Bakr Muḥammad ibn al-Ḥasan ibn Miqsam ibn Yaʽqūb (d. 944),); a grammarian and Qurʽānic reader who wrote The Sessions of Thaʽlab.
- Al-Akhfash al-Asghar (d.927)
- Ibn Durustūyah (ابن درستويه) (ca.871 -958) wrote The Middle Ground between Thaʽlab and al-Akhfash al-Mujāshiʽī, about the meaning of the Qurʽān, and Refutation of Thaʽlab, concerning Thaʽlab's book “Disagreement of Grammarians”. (Note: The book Disagreement of Grammarians by Thaʽlab.)
- Abū Bakr ibn al-Anbārī (ابو بكر ابن الانبارى) (885 - 940) learned grammar from Abū al-'Abbās Thaʽlab
- Hārūn Ibn al-Ḥāʽik, a Jew from al-Ḥīrah was an outstanding student of grammatical studies at al-Kūfah and was a pupil of Thaʽlab.
- Abū Muḥammad ʽAbd Allāh al-Shamī (the Syrian) a member of the school of al- Kūfah who wrote Collected Questions.
- Abū ʽUmar al-Zāhid al-Mutarriz (ابو عمر الزاهد), or al-Zāhid ʽThe Asceticʽ, who was nicknamed "Ghulām Thaʽlab" (Note: Abū ʽUmar Muḥammad ibn ʽAbd al-Wāḥid ibn Hāshim al-Mutarriz, known as al-Zāhid.) (870 - 957), wrote a commentary on Thaʽlab's Kitāb al-Faṣīḥ. (Note: The Kitāb al-Faṣīḥ is not listed in the Beatty MS is listed last in Flügel. Yāqūt Irshād VI (2), 153 says the composition of al-Ḥasan ibn Dāʽūd al-Raqqī was ascribed to Thaʽlab, who only transcribed it. Suyūṭī Bughyat, p. 173 ascribed it both to al-Ḥasan al-Raqqī and Ibn al-Sikkīt.)
- Al-Ḥāmiḍ (Note: Abū Mūsā Sulaymān ibn Muḥammad ibn Aḥmad al-Ḥāmiḍ may have been a copyist apprentice, and bookshop owner, who authored some books and probably transcribed for Thaʽlab.) was a scholar of al-Baṣrah, a scribe, and close friend of Thaʽlab.
- Nafṭuwayh (Note: Nafṭuwayh, or Nifṭawayh, Abū ʽAbd Allāh Ibrāhīm ibn Muḥammad ibn ʽUrfah ibn Sulaymān ibn Mughayrah ibn Ḥabīb ibn al-Muhallab al-ʽAtakī al-Azdī.) (ca.858 - 935) learned from Thaʽlab and al-Mubarrad, Muḥammad ibn al-Jahm (d. 895), ʽUbayd Allāh ibn Isḥāq ibn Salām, and the associates of al-Madāʽinī (753 - 846).
- Abū ʽAbd Allāh al-Yazīdī (Note: Al-Yazīdī, Abū ʽAbd Allāh Muḥammad ibn al-ʽAbbās ibn Muḥammad ibn Yaḥyā ibn Mubārak) (ابو عبد الله اليزيدى) (d. 922) preceptor to Caliph Al-Muqtadir

=== Poets edited by Thaʽlab ===
- al-Aʽshā (الاعشى) (Note: Al-Aʽshā al-Kābir, Maymūn ibn Qays, Abū Baṣīr, poet who joined Muḥammad. He died at Yamāmah.)
- Al-Nābighatān (النابغتان) (Note: Al-Nābighatān, “the two Nābighahs”; Al-Nābighah al-Dhubyānī and Al-Nābighah al-Jaʽdi.)
- Ṭufayl (طفيل) (Note: Ṭufayl ibn ʽAwf al-Ghanawī, poet of the Jahiliyyah.)
- Al-Ṭirimmāḥ (الطِرِمّاح), (Note: Al-Ṭirimmāḥ ibn Ḥakīm, 8th-century poet from Damascus who lived at al-Kūfah.) etc.
