= Ibn al-'Arabi =

Ibn al-ʿArabī may refer to:

- Ibn Arabi (1165–1240), Andalusi Muslim philosopher
- Abu Bakr ibn al-Arabi (1076–1148), Andalusi Muslim scholar of Maliki jurisprudence

== See also ==
- Ibn al-A'rabi, (ca. 760 – 846), philologist, genealogist, and oral traditionist of Arabic tribal poetry
