= Abu Jaʿfar an-Nahhas =

Islamic scholar and Qur'anic exegete (d. 949)

- أبو جعفر النحاس
- Born: c. 874 CE (c. 260 AH); Fustat, Abbasid Caliphate (modern Cairo, Egypt)
- Died: 949 CE (338 AH); Cairo, Abbasid Caliphate (under Ikhshidid dynasty)
- Era: Islamic Golden Age
- Writing career
- Notable works: I'rab al-Qur'an (إعراب القرآن); Ma'ani al-Qur'an (معاني القرآن); At-Tuffaha (التفاحة)

Abu Jaʿfar An-Nahhas (أبو جعفر النحاس; c. 874 CE – 949 CE; c. 260 AH – 338 AH) was an Egyptian Muslim scholar of grammar and Qur'anic exegete during the 10th-century Abbasid period.

== Life ==
Abū Jaʿfar Aḥmad b. Muḥammad b. Ismā‘īl b. Yūnus al-Murādi, surnamed al-Nahhās "coppersmith", was born in Fustat circa 260 AH. He studied in Baghdad under the foremost grammarians of the period, like Abu Ishaq al-Zajjaj who familiarised him with Al-Kitāb by Sībawayh. He also studied philology under Al-Akhfash al-Aṣghar and Nifṭawayh. He is the author of an influential work on abrogation, Al-Nāsīkh wal-Mansūkh. He wrote a full grammatical analysis of the Qur'an and a grammatical primer known as "The Apple" (التفاحة at-Tuffāha). He also wrote works on poetry, including a commentary on the Mu'allaqat.

== Death ==
He was killed as he was reciting poetry sitting on the banks of the Nile in Cairo. The story goes that a passing peasant thought he was uttering a magical curse to prevent the rise of the Nile to raise the price of food, and so kicked him into the river causing him to drown.

== Sources ==
- Mac Guckin de Slane, (trans.), Ibn Khallikan's Biographical Dictionary, vol. 1, Paris, 1843, p. 81.
- Louis Moréri, Le grand dictionnaire historique (1759), Abou-Giafar al Nahas
