= Abū Naṣr Aḥmad ibn Ḥātim al-Bāhilī =

Abū Naṣr Aḥmad ibn Ḥātim al-Bāhilī (d. 231 AH/846 CE) was an Arabic-language poet and scholar.

== Life and works ==
Little is known of Abū Naṣr's life. His tribal surname al-Bāhilī associates him with a tribe from Najd. He is known to have had a number of students who themselves became successful scholars, especially Abū l-ʿAbbās Thaʿlab, and at least some of his works circulated as far east as Persia and as far west as al-Andalus. He was active in Isfahan. He had a widely reported dislike of his nephew Abū ʿAbd Allāh Muḥammad ibn Ziyād Ibn al-Aʿrābī.

Ibn al-Nadim's Kitāb al-Fihrist, a major catalogue of books from c. 998 CE, records the following works for al-Bāhilī; none survive, at least not in their original form and under al-Bāhilī's name. Several, indeed, seem likely to have been al-Bāhilī's own adaptation of earlier works of the same name by al-Aṣmaʿī:

- Kitāb al-Ibil A ('The Camel')
- Kitāb Abyāt al-maʿānī ('A Verses of [Ambiguous] Meanings')
- Kitāb al-Zarʿ wa-l-nakhl ('Cereal Crops and Palms')
- Kitāb al-Khayl A ('The Horse')
- Kitāb al-Shajar wa-l-nabāt ('A Trees and Plants')
- Kitāb al-Libāʾ wa-l-laban ('Beestings and Milk')
- Kitāb al-Ishtiqāq ('A Derivation of Names')
- Kitāb al-Ṭayr ('Birds')
- Kitāb Mā talḥanu fī-hi l-ʿāmma ('Vulgar Dialecticisms')
- Kitāb al-Jarād ('The Locust')

The closest we have to a complete surviving text by al-Bāhilī seems to be a commentary on the poems of Dhū l-Rumma, in a greatly altered recension by Abū l-ʿAbbās Thaʿlab (d. 291/904) which draws on al-Bāhilī's commentary alongside other commentaries. Al-Bāhilī's Kitāb Abyāt al-maʿānī, which probably drew on al-Aṣmaʿī's Kitāb Maʿānī al-shiʿr but was a distinct work, was quite widely quoted, which allows for fairly good insights into its content; these quotations have been collected, and translated into English, by David Larsen.
