= Ancient City of Tabran =

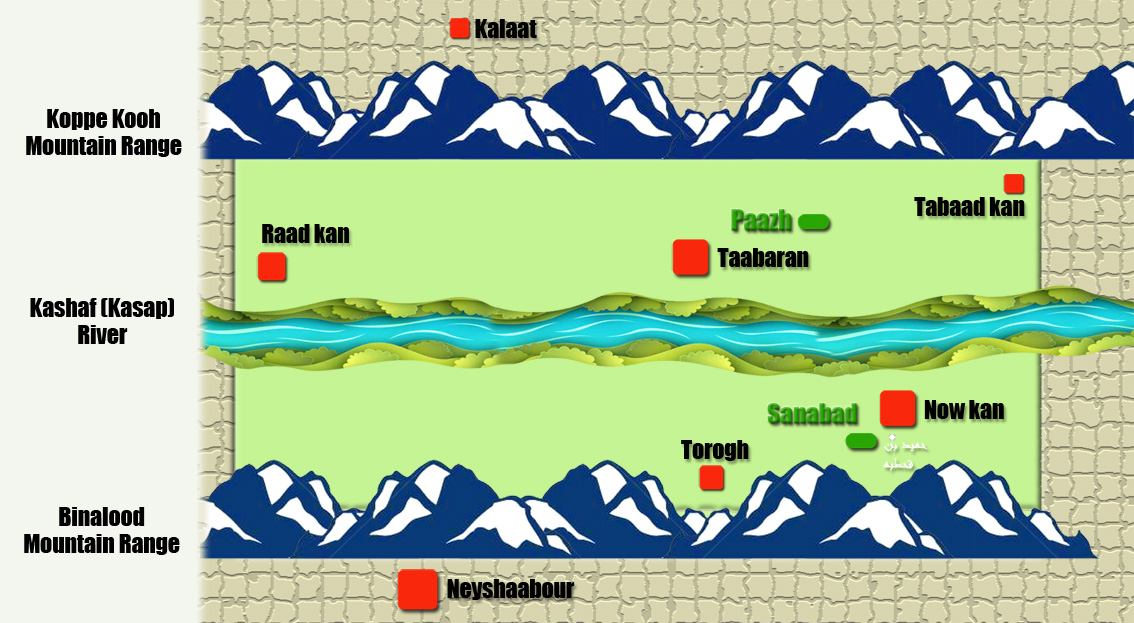
Toos (ancient Susia) region

Tabran was the ancient part of the city of Tus, north east of Iran. Ancient Tus was located in the area between Binalud mountains in south and Hezar Masjid mountains in north. Tus was divided into four cities, Tabran, Radakan, Noan and Teroid. The whole area which today is only called Tus was the largest city in the whole area in fifth century. What is left from ancient city of Tabran is the city's battlement, the citadel, the Haruniyeh Dome, remnant of Tabran, grand mosque and finally garden and the renovated tomb of Ferdowsi.

This city was the birthplace of Iran's famous poet Ferdowsi.

== Tabran Battlement ==
Tus battlement is a grand wall made of clay about six Km built around the city of Tabran. The wall remains today 24 km north of the city of Meshed. In the ancient days the wall used to have 106 towers and 9 gates of which 4 are recognizable. These fortifications used to hold some government buildings and temporarily royal residence.

== Harooniye Monument ==
This monument is about 600 meters from the tomb of the famous Iranian poet Ferdowsi. It was built in the ninth century on the ruins of the city of Tabran. Just next to the building is a small monument of Imam Mohammad Ghazali a philosopher of the 12th century.

== Remnants of Tabran's Grand Mosque ==
Archaeological excavations around Harooniye brought to surface the oldest mosque in Khorassn province and one of the first mosques of Iran. The remnants of the mosque, 96 meters length and 53 meters width is about 150 meters south west of Harooniye.
