= Al-Akhfash al-Akbar =

Arab grammarian and Scholar of Caliphate era

- الأخفش الأكبر
- Born: Abu al-Khaṭṭāb ʻAbd al-Ḥamīd ibn ʻAbd al-Majīd; Basra
- Died: 177 AH/793 CE
- Occupation: Grammarian
- Known for: Arabic grammar, lexicography, commentary and analysis of Arabic poetry
- Notable work: Revised Sibawayh's famous Kitab

Abu al-Khaṭṭāb ʻAbd al-Ḥamīd ibn ʻAbd al-Majīd (Arabic: أبو الخطاب عبد الحميد بن عبد المجيد; died 177 AH/793 CE), commonly known as Al-Akhfash al-Akbar (Arabic: الأخفش الأكبر) was an Arab grammarian who lived in Basra and associated with the method of Arabic grammar of its linguists, and was a client of the Qais tribe.

His most notable students were: Sibawayh, Yunus ibn Habib, Abu ʿUbaidah, Abu Zayd al-Ansari and Al-Asma'i. Al-Akhfash revised his student Sibawayh's famous Kitab, the first book ever written on Arabic grammar, and was responsible for circulating the first manuscripts after his student's untimely death. Al-Akhfash was also one of the first linguists to contribute significantly to commentary and analysis of Arabic poetry. Additionally, he contributed to Arabic philology as well as lexicography, recording vocabulary and expressions of the Bedouin tribes which had not previously been recorded.

== Other Akhfashs ==
Al-Akhfash al-Akbar is one of three famous grammarians known by the name Al-Akhfash, distinguished by epithets denoting relative age: al-Akbar (“the Greater / Oldest”), al-Awsāt (“the Middle”), and al-Aṣghar (“the Younger”).

== See also ==
- al-Akhfash al-Awsat (the Middle)
- al-Akhfash al-Aṣghar (the Younger)
- Akhfash's goat
