= Al-Tusi =

Al-Tusi or Tusi is the title of several Iranian scholars who were born in the town of Tous in Khorasan. Some of the scholars with the al-Tusi title include:

- Abu Nasr as-Sarraj al-Tūsī (d. 988), Sufi sheikh and historian.
- Aḥmad al Ṭūsī (d. 1193), Persian author of a book known by the same title as ʿAjāʾib al-makhlūqāt of Qazwini.
- Asadi Tusi (d. 1072), Persian poet.
- Ferdowsi Tusi (935–1020), Persian poet.
- Nasīr al-Dīn al-Tūsī (1201–1274), Persian polymath.
- Nizam al-Mulk al-Tusi (1018–1092), Persian vizier.
- Sharaf al-Dīn al-Tūsī or Sharafeddin Tusi (1135–1213), Persian mathematician.
- Shaykh Tusi or Abu Ja'far al-Tusi (995–1067), Islamic scholar.
- Alâeddin Ali Tûsî (d. 1482) Ottoman scholar
