= Haruniyeh Dome =

Historic monument in Tus, Iran

Haruniyeh Dome گنبد هارونیه
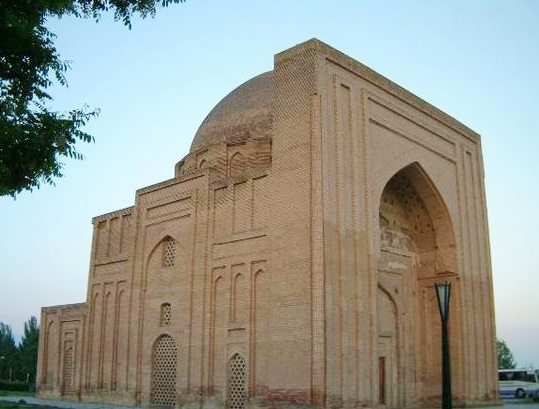

- Location within Iran
- 36°28′47″N 59°30′25″E
- Location: Tus, Khorasan province, Iran

Iran National Heritage List
- Official name: Haruniyeh Dome
- Type: Mausoleum
- Designated: 1932
- Reference no.: 173
- Conservation organization: Cultural Heritage, Handicrafts and Tourism Organization of Iran

Haruniyeh Dome (Persian: گنبد هارونیه) is a historic monument in Tus, Razavi Khorasan province, Iran.

Haruniyeh Dome is the oldest monument left in the city. This historic site is located about 600 meters from the Tomb of Ferdowsi, the famous Iranian poet. It is exclusively a monastery or tomb that was built on the ruins of Tabran in the 15th century. Tabran was a section of Tus which does not exist today.

Next to this building a black stone as the memorial of Al-Ghazali, one of the Iranian mystics of the 13th century. Haruniyeh was built on the model of early Islamic architecture of Iran. It is among the historical sites recorded by the Iranian Cultural Heritage Organization.

== Gallery ==
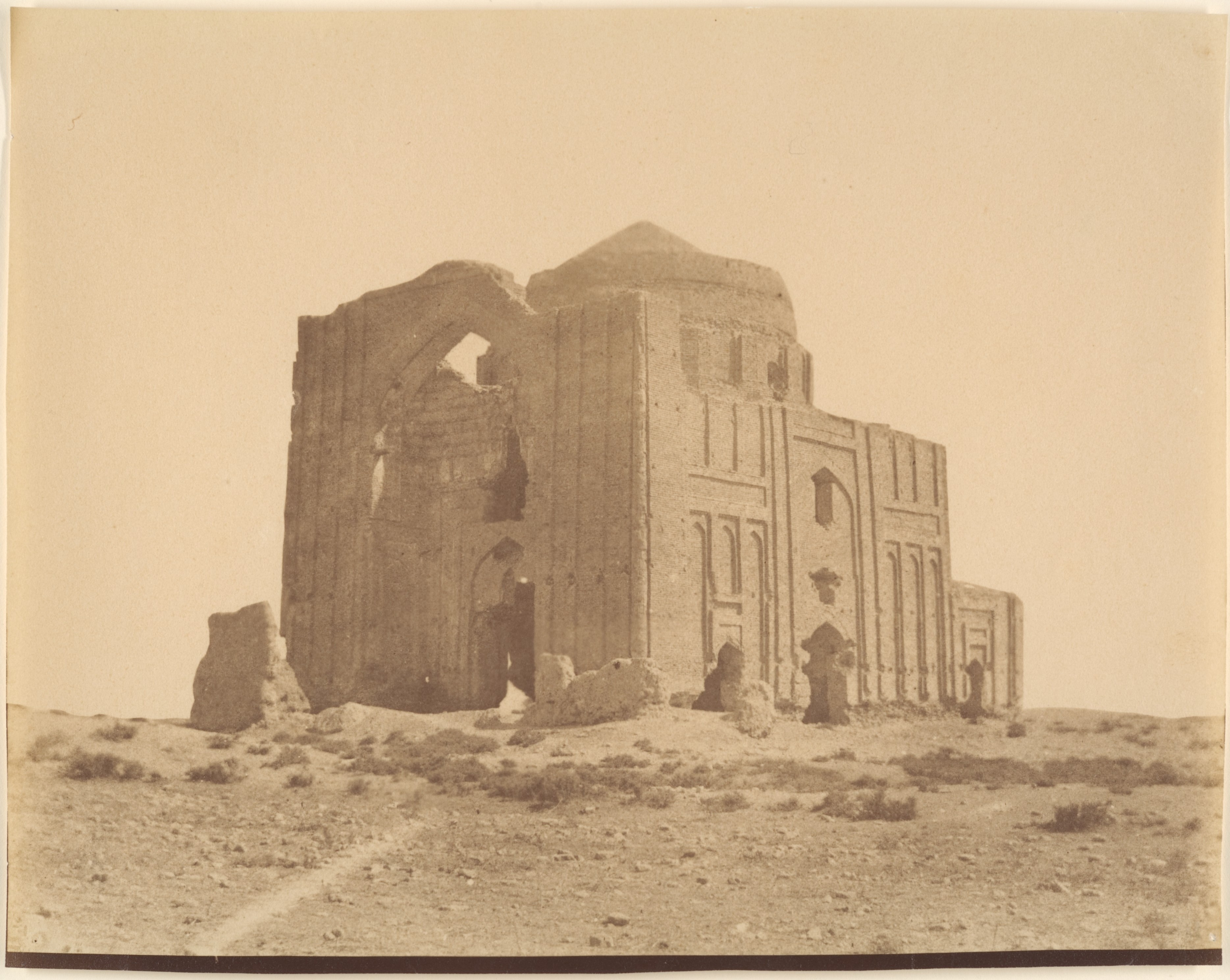
Photograph of Haruniyeh Dome by Luigi Pesce, 1840s–60s

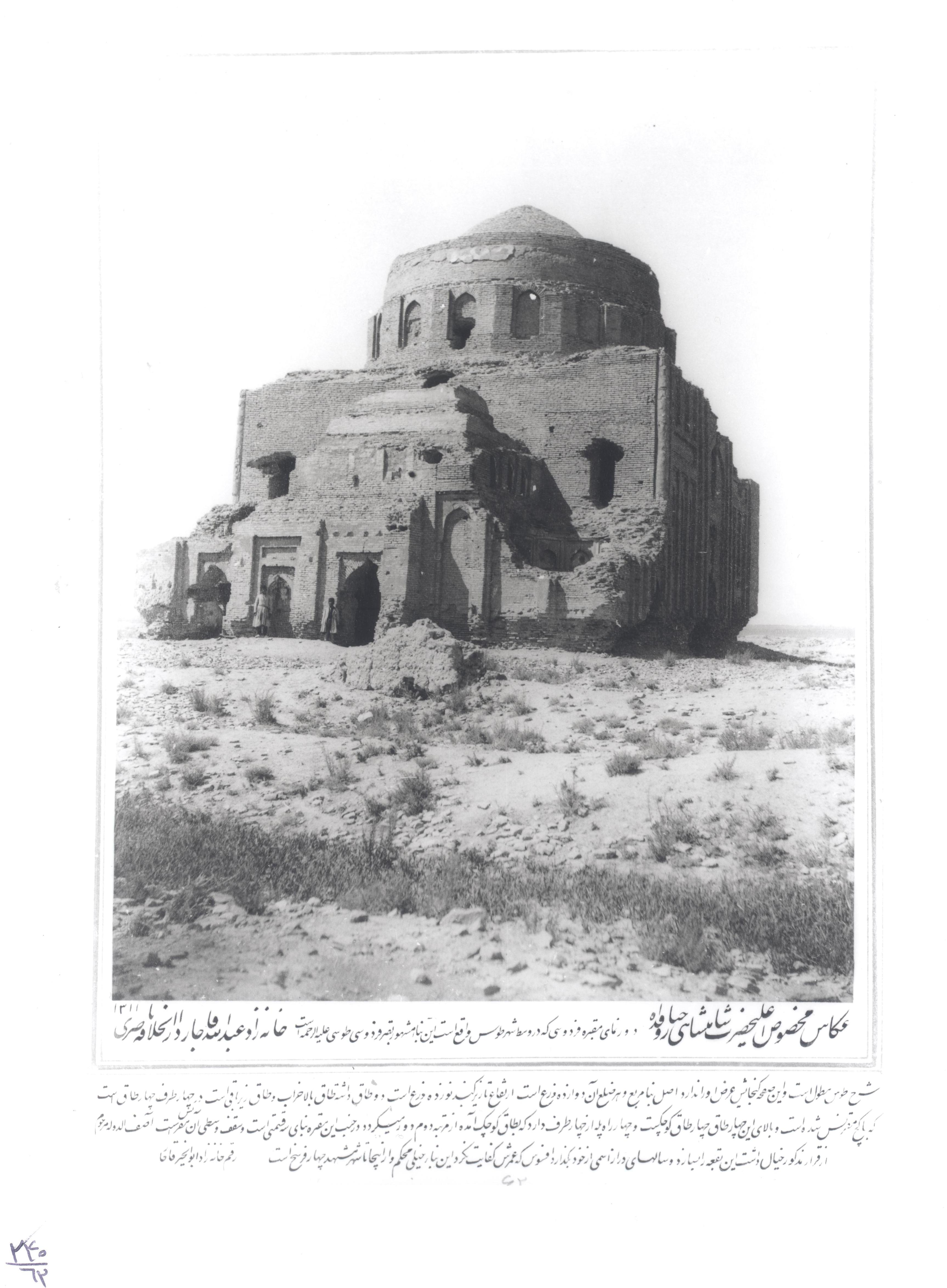
Photograph of Haruniyeh Dome by Abdollah Mirza Qajar, 1894. It has been mistaken for Ferdowsi's tomb in its caption.

Interior

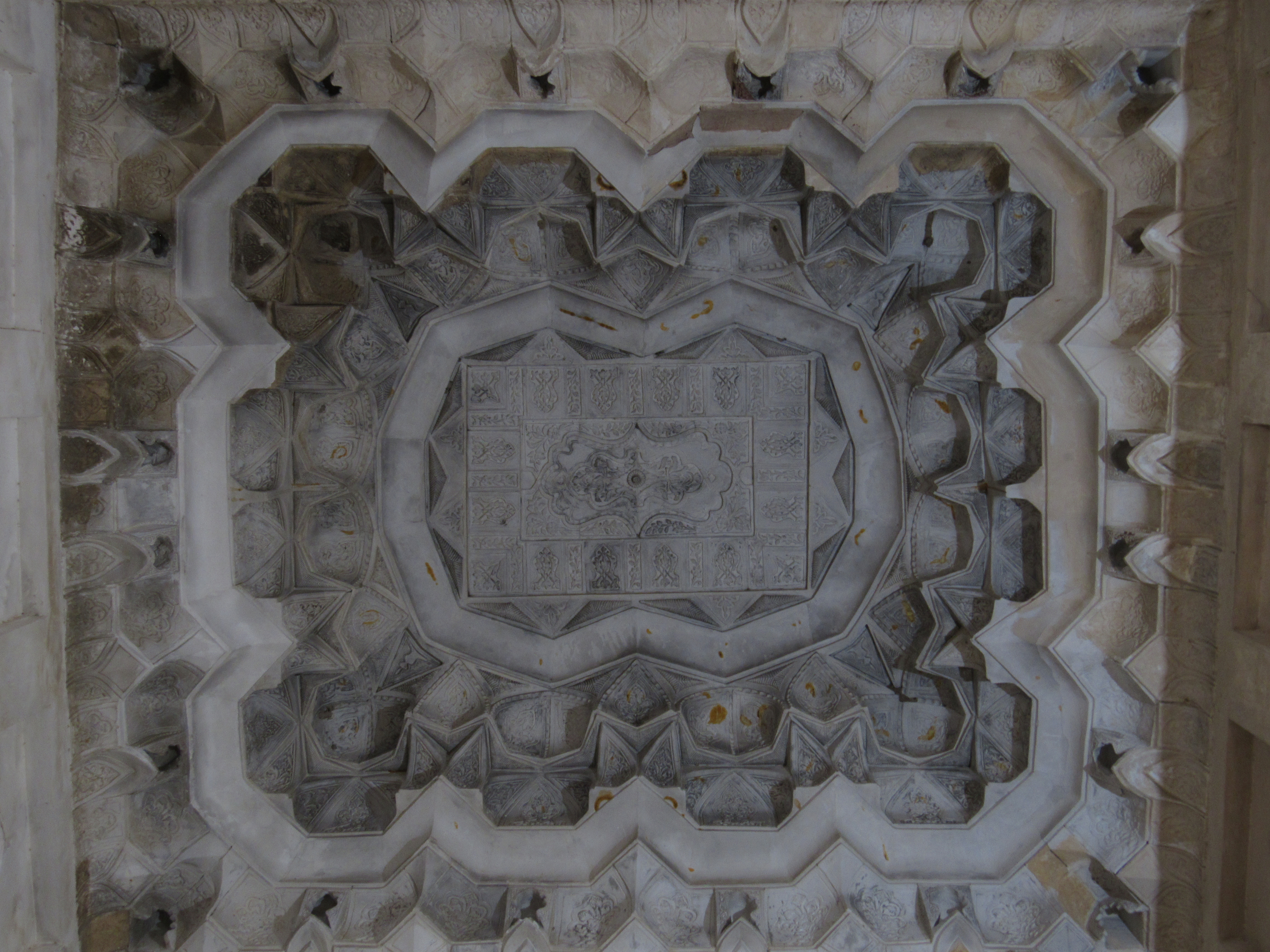
Ceiling

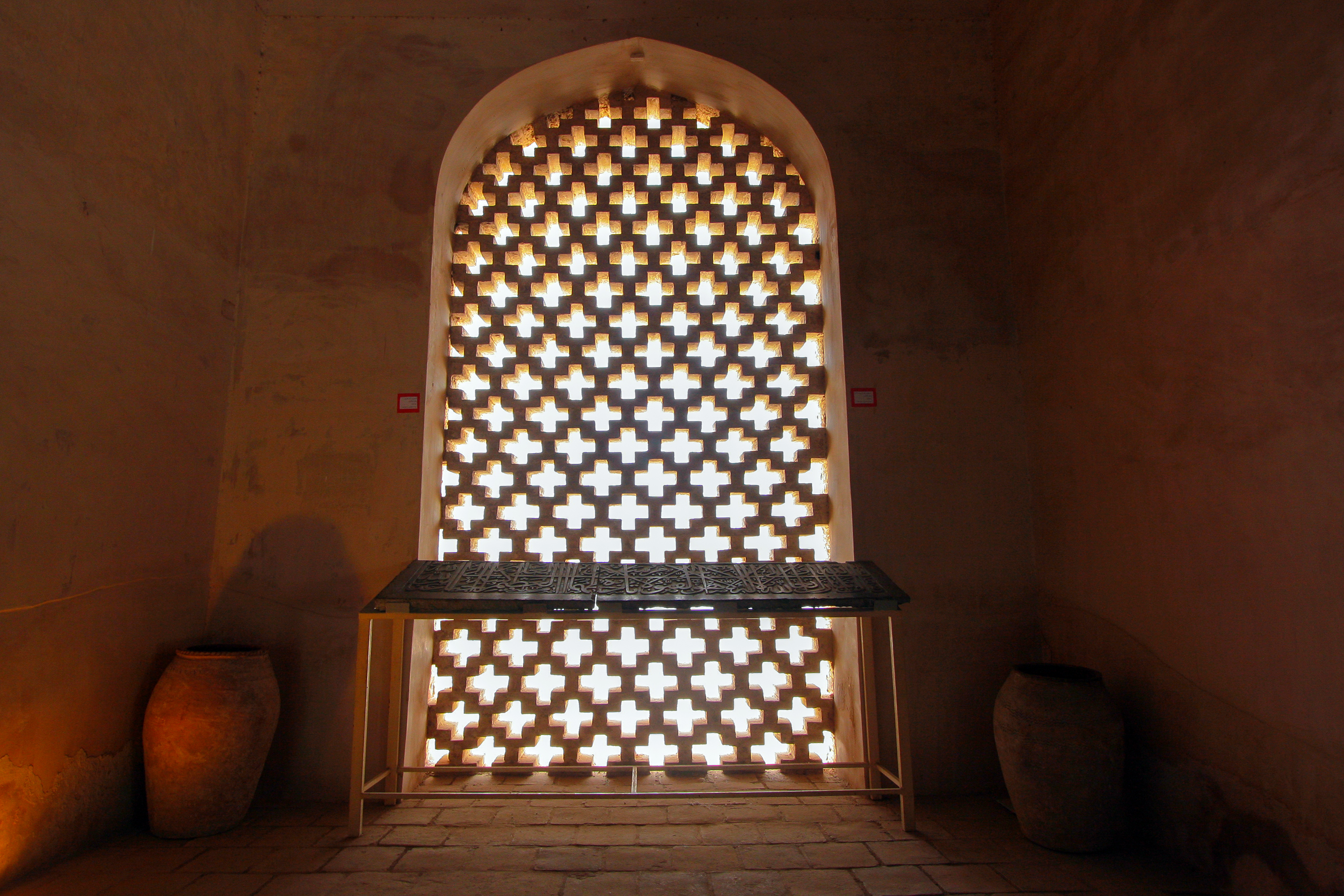
Window

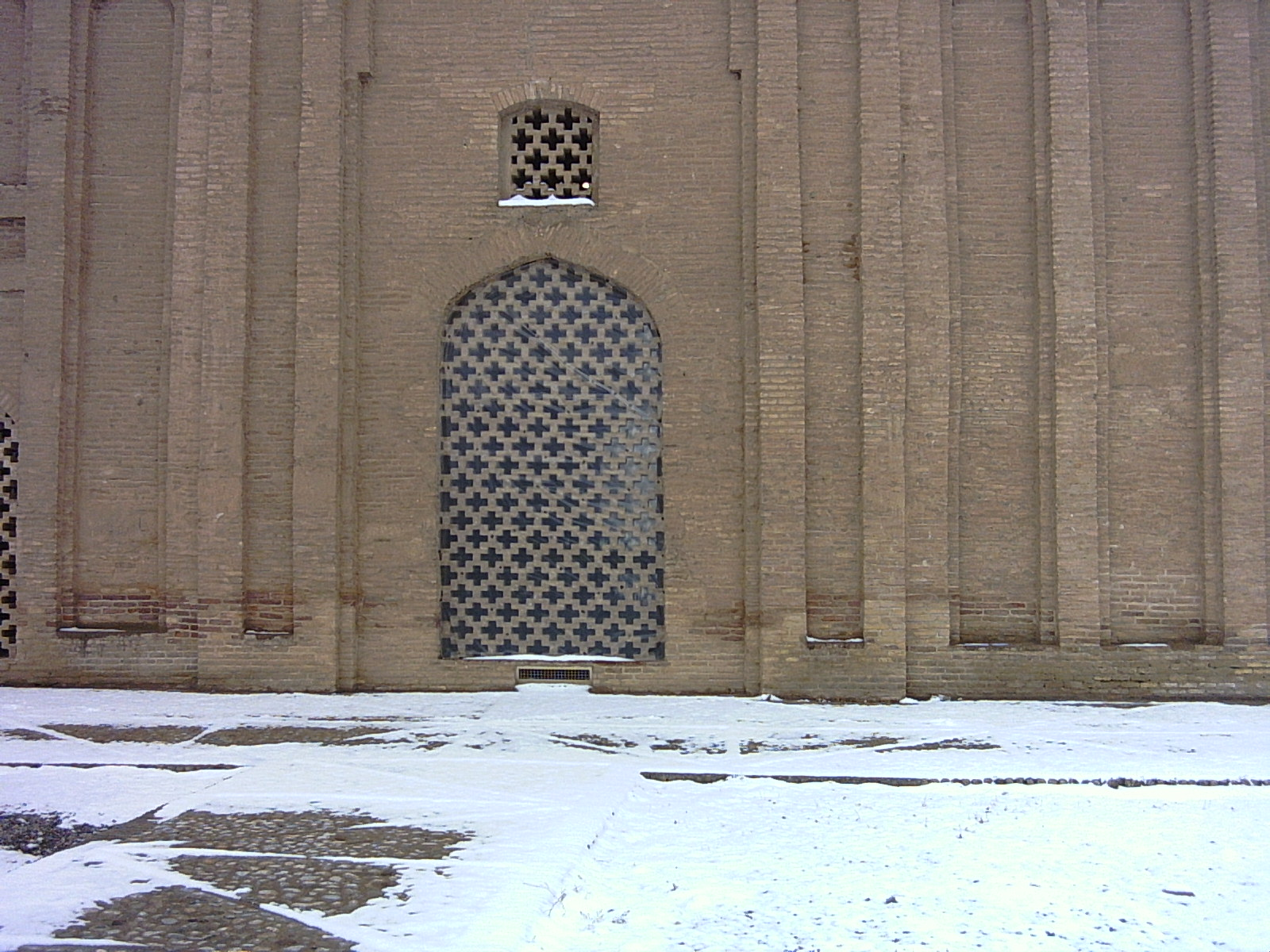
Harooniyeh in winter

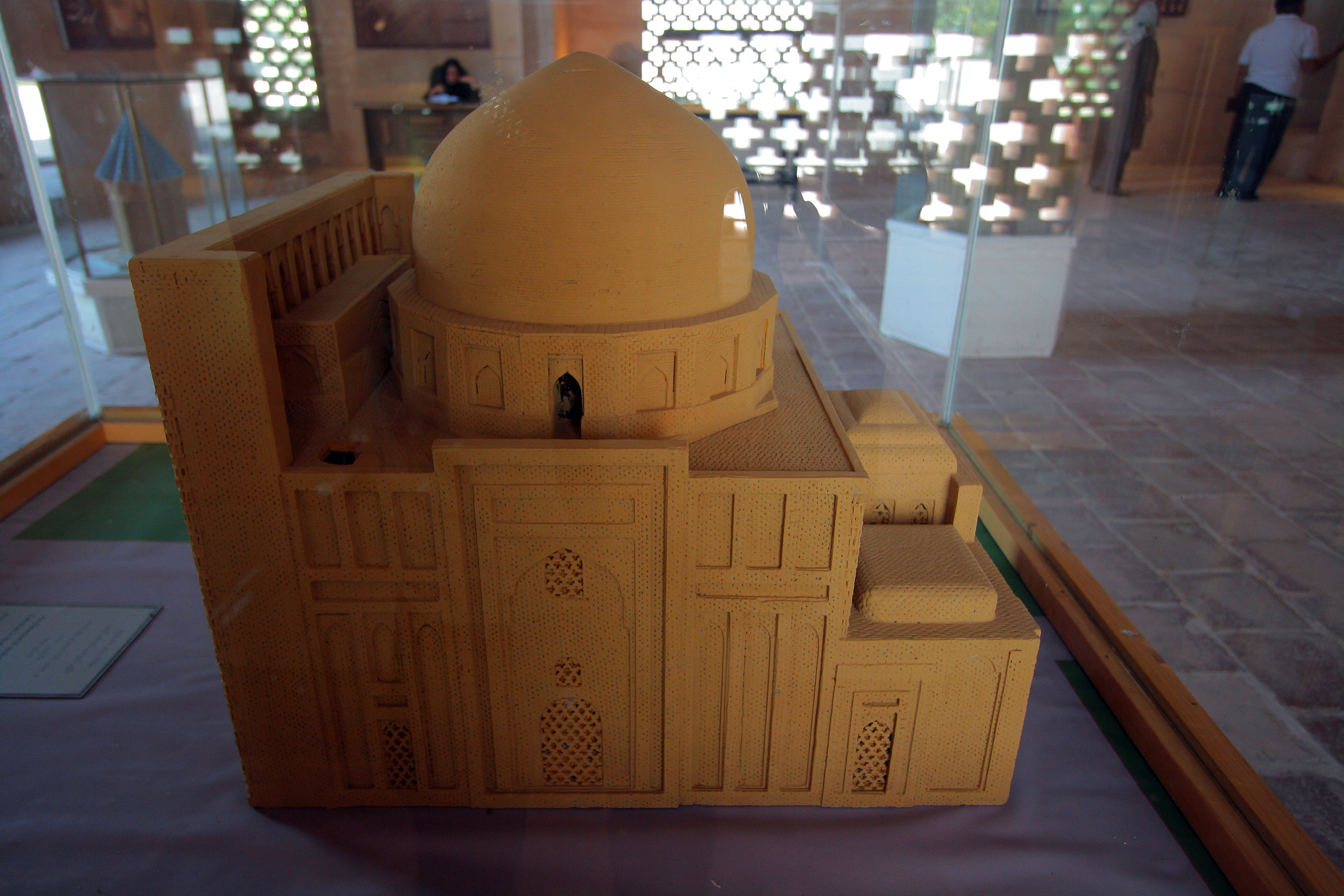
An architectural model of harooniyeh, Tus
