= Ibn al-A'rabi =

8th c. Iraqi philologer

Ibn al-Aʿrābī (ابن الاعرابى)
- Born: ca. 760 al-Kūfah, Iraq
- Died: 846; Surra Man Ra’ā (Sāmarrā), Iraq
- Other name: Abū ʿAbd Allāh Muḥammad ibn Ziyād ibn al-Aʿrābī (ابو عبد الله محمد بن زياد الاعرابى)

Academic work
- Era: Abbasid Era
- School or tradition: Grammarians of Kufa
- Main interests: philology, natural science, Ḥadīth, tafsir, poetry

Abū ʿAbd Allāh Muḥammad ibn Ziyād (ابو عبد الله محمد بن زياد), surnamed Ibn al-Aʿrābī (ابن الاعرابى) (ca. 760 – 846, Sāmarrā); a philologist, genealogist, and oral traditionist of Arabic tribal poetry. A grammarian of the school of al-Kūfah, who rivalled the grammarians of al-Baṣrah in poetry recital. He was famous for his knowledge of rare expressions and for transmitting the famous anthology of ancient Arabic poetry, Al-Mufaḍḍalīyāt. (Note: Khallikān, Wafayāt, I, 379)

The meaning of the word A'rābī, and its difference to the word Arabī, is explained by the exegete al-Sijistānī, (Note: Muḥammad ibn ʿUzayr Abū Bakr al-Sijistānī; See Dhahabī (al-), Ta’rīkh al-Islām, n.646; Khallikān, Wafayāt, III, 27, n.9; Nadīm (al-) Al-Fihrist, 77-8, 1101; Ziriklī, Al-A’lām, VII, 149) in his book on rare Qur’ānic terms: A'rābī is an Arab desert inhabitant, whereas Arabī is a non-desert dwelling Arab.

== Life ==
Ibn al-Aʿrābī was born in al-Kūfah in 760. His father, Ziyād, had been captured from Sindh, probably by the Banū Hāshim, or possibly by the Banū Shaybān or some other tribe. He himself was a mawla (client) of al-Abbās ibn Muḥammad ibn Alī ibn ʿAbd Allāh. He was said to have a cast. (Note: A strabismus was considered a mark of beauty. See Slane (de), vol.I, 26, n.1.) His mother had been a servant of, and later married, al-Mufaḍḍal ibn Muḥammad al-Ḍabbī, the author of Al-Mufaḍḍalīyāt, and as his stepson, Ibn al-Aʿrābī received a broad education in the Ḥadīth, poetry, history, theology, genealogy and literature. The centres of scholarship in these fields encompassed by the term ʿphilology’ were at al-Baṣrah, al-Kūfah, and later at Baghdād. Apart from al-Mufaḍḍal, Ibn al-A'rābī's principal tutor was the qāḍī (judge) al-Qāsim ibn Ma’n ibn ʿAbd al-Raḥmān. Abū Mu’āwiyah al-Ḍarīr (Note: Khallikān, Wafayāt, I. 187; Nadīm (al-), Al-Fihrist, 67, 154), and al-Kisā’ī, (Note: Khallikān, Wafayāt, II, 237; Nadīm (al-), Al-Fihrist, 152-3) also tutored him.

Ibn al- Aʿrābī became a scholar of the Arab tribes and of the poets of the Jahiliya (pre-Islamic) and Islamic era, up to the beginning of the rule of the Banū al-ʿAbbās. (Note: For well-known translations of some of these ancient poems, see Mufaḍḍal, Mufaḍḍalīyāt (Lyall) and Tammām, Al-Ḥamāsah.) Other scholars were Abū ʿAmr al-Shaybānī, Khālid ibn Kulthūm (Note: Khālid ibn Kulthūm al-Kalbī al-Kūfī, tribal genealogist, poetry scholar and folklorist of Kūfah in 8th-century; Suyūṭī (1909), Bughyat, 241; Nadīm (al-), Al-Fihrist, 145, 344), Muḥammad ibn Ḥabīb, al-Ṭūsī, (Note: Al-Ṭūsī, Abū al-Ḥasan ʿAlī ibn ʿAbd Allāh of Ṭūs; Zubaydī, Ṭabaqāt al-Naḥwīyīn wa-al-Lughawīyīn, 225; Khallikān, Wafayāt, IV, 262, 269, n.1; Nadīm (al-), Al-Fihrist, 153, 156, 158, 345–6, 1113.) and al-Aṣma’ī.

His lectures were very popular and Abū al-Abbās Tha’lab, (Note: Khallikān, Wafayāt, I, 83; Nadīm (al-) Al-Fihrist, 86, 191, 345, 348, 1110.) who was his student of ten years, reports that a hundred people typically attended his lectures, coming from as far afield as Isfījāb in Transoxiana, and from Spain. A glimpse into the setting for scholarly debate occurring at this time is indicated in an anecdote told by Thaʿlab, where a group of scholars, that included al-Sukkarī, (Note: Flügel gives the name 'al-Sukkarī'. In Beatty MS of Al-Fihrist the name is illegible. Aḥmad ibn Saʿīd was probably Ibn Shāhīn of al-Baṣrah, who, like Ibn al-Aʿrābī, was older than Thaʿlab.) Abū al-ʿĀliyah and Ibn al-A'rābī, had assembled at the home of Aḥmad ibn Sa’īd. It appears that Aḥmad ibn Saʿīd and Ibn al-Aʿrabi were astonished, presumably impressed, by Thaʿlab’s precocious critique of a poem by al-Shammākh. Conversely, he had a running feud with his uncle Abū Naṣr Aḥmad b. Ḥātim al-Bāhilī, who destested him.

Ibn al-Aʿrābī quoted such Arabian linguistic authorities as al-Ṣamūtī, (Note: Al-Ṣamūtī, tribal linguist; Nadīm (al-), ed. Dodge, Al-Fihrist, 153.) al-Kalbī, and Abū Mujīb (Note: Abū Mujīb, or Abū al-Muḥabbib al-Rabaʿī, or Ribʿī, a scholar of tribal language; Durayd, ed. Wüstenfeld (1854) Geneal., 170, l.7.; Nadīm (al-), ed. Dodge, Al-Fihrist, 218). His pupils included Ibrāhīm al-Ḥarbī, (Note: Khallikān, Wafayāt, I, 46; Nadīm (al-), Al-Fihrist, 81, 304, 557; Taghrī-Birdī, III, 116,118.) Ibn al-Sikkīt, (Note: See Khallikān, Wafayāt, IV, 293; Nadīm (al-), Al-Fihrist, 158-60, 345–8, 1101) and Ibn al-Azhar. (Note: Ibn al-Azhar Jaʿfar ibn Abī Muḥammad, (ca. 815 – 892) historian, traditionist; Mas'ūdī, tr. Meynard (de), Courteille (de)VII, 379; Nadīm (al-), Al-Fihrist, 248.) As a leading philologist, Ibn al- Aʿrābī was critical of rival scholars of rare linguistic expressions (al-kalām al-gharīb), and in particular of Abū Ubaydah (Note: See Khallikān, Wafayāt, III, 388; Nadīm (al-), Al-Fihrist, 115-9, 1116; Yāqūt, Irshād, VI, 164.) and al-Aṣma’ī. (Note: Khallikān, Wafayāt, II, 123; Nadīm (al-), Al-Fihrist, 119, 345–8, 965.) He proposed orthographic liberalisation and urged permissiveness in the substitution of the letter dād (ض) for the letter zā (ظ). Muḥammad ibn Ḥabīb, (Note: Muḥammad ibn Ḥabīb, Abū Ja'far (d. 860), scholar of tribal dialects and poetry, and folklorist. Khallikān, III, 622, 627, n.36; Nadīm (al-), 98, 104, 191, 234, 344, 1053.) quoted Ibn al-A’rābī, along with Quṭrub, Abū ʿUbaydah, Abū al-Yaqẓān, (Note: Abū al-Yaqẓān, ʿĀmir ibn Ḥafṣ, Suḥaym (d. 876), a genealogist and traditionist; Yāqūt, Irshād, VI (4) 226; Ṭabarī, ed., de Goeje (1879–90) Annales, I, 3134, 3190.) et al.

Tha’lab (Note: Tha’lab, Abū al-Abbās Aḥmad ibn Yaḥyā al-Baghdādī (815–904); the Grammarian; Khallikān, Wafayāt I, 83–90;Nadīm (al-), Al-Fihrist, 86, 191, 345, 348, 1110.) and al-Ṭabarī wrote Ibn al-A'rābī's biography, while anecdotes about him and his philological commentaries were popular. Thaʿlab reports never seeing a book in his hand, even when he was over eighty years old. This was a huge tribute as scholars attached great importance to facility of memorisation. Tha'lab also claims no one surpassed Ibn al-A'rābī in his knowledge of poetry. Al-Nadīm read Ibn al-Kūfī ʿs (Note: Abū al-Ḥasan ʿAlī ibn Muḥammad ibn ʿUbaud ibn al-Zubayr al-Asadī; (868–960); Khaṭīb Baghdādī, XII, 81, § 6489; Yāqūt, Irshād, VI (5), 326; Nadīm (al-), Al-Fihrist, 6, 145, 151–158, 162, 173–4, 192, 864, 1033.) account that Thaʿlab had heard him say he was born the night Abū Ḥanīfah died. Al-Qāsim had met, and was an admirer of, Abū Ḥanīfah.

Ibn al-Aʿrābī died in 846 (231 AH), in Surra Man Ra’ā, (i.e. the ancient name of Sāmarrā), Iraq, aged eighty years, four months and three days.

== Works ==
Among his books there were:

- Kitāb Al-Nawadir (كتاب النوادر); (ʿAnecdotes’), a large book; Rare Forms, which was quoted by a group of scholars among whom were al-Ṭūsī, Thaʿlab, and others —some say there were twelve and some say nine quotations (transcriptions);
- Al-Anwā’ (كتاب الانواء) Al-Anwā’; (Note: Anwā, i.e. mansions of the moon. Many authors wrote works with this title on astronomical and meteorological influences.)
- Ṣifat al-Khayl (كتاب صفة النحل); ʿDescription of the Horse’;
- Ṣifat al-Zara’ (كتاب صفة الزرع) ʿDescription of the Palm (or Corn in the Blade)’;
- Al-Khayl (كتاب الخيل) ʿHorses’;
- Madh al-Qabā’il (كتاب مدح القبائل) ʿTribute of the (History [epochs] of the) Tribes’;
- Ma’anī al-Sha’ir (كتاب معانى الشعر) ʿMeaning of Poetry’;
- Tafsīr al-Amthāl (كتاب تفسير الأمثال) ʿExplanation of Similes’, or ʿExposition of Proverbs’
- Al-Nabāt (كتاب النبات) 'Plants';
- Al-Alfāz (كتاب الالفاظ) ʿPronunciations (Dialects)’ or ʿVocabulary’;
- Nisba al-Khail (كتاب نسب الخيل) ʿPedigrees of Horses’;
- Nawadir al-Zabīrīyīn (كتاب نوادر الزبيريين) Rare Forms of the Inhabitants of Dabīr; (Note: Dabīr is a Persian village. See Yāqūt, Geog., II, 547. The name is clearly written in the Beatty MS, but Flügel gives al-Zubayrīyīn.)
- Nawādir banī Fakās (كتاب نوادر بنى فقعس) ʿAnecdotes of the Banū Faqʿas; (Note: Banū Faqʿas Tribe, See Durayd, Geneal., p. III.)
- Al-Dabāb – bi khaṭ al-Sukkarī (كتاب الذباب – بخط السكرى); ʿFlies' – copied in the handwriting of al-Sukkarī. (Note: Khallikān, Wafayāt, I, p.xxiii.)
- Al-Nabāt wa-al-Baqal (كتاب النبت والبقل) ʿPlants and Herbs’; (Note: Omitted in Beatty MS of Al-Fihrist.)
- Gharīb al-Ḥadīth (غريب الحديث) The Strange in the Ḥadīth

== Legacy ==
Al-A'rābī's importance as a philologist, or linguistic scientist, of the Arab language, and his milieu, can be estimated by the account given by the tenth-century bibliophile Al-Nadim, who writing about a hundred and fifty years after the death of Ibn al-A'rābī, describes visiting the library in the city of al-Ḥadīthah of Muḥammad ibn al-Ḥusayn, known as ʿIbn Abī Baʿrah’, who had received a collection of ancient writings from a Shī’ī book-collector of al-Kūfah. Among the material on the sciences of Arabs and other nations, there were documents written on double parchment, deeds, taʿlīqāt, (Note: TaʿLīqāt: ʿfinancial accounts’, ʿsupplements’ or ʿmarginal notes’.) poems, papers on grammar, anecdotes, historical traditions, names, genealogies, etc., on adam (Note: Adam is plural of adīm, a type of parchment. See ed., Dodge, B., Al-Fihrist, p.90, n.12.) skins and on paper from Egypt, China, Tihāmah, and Khurāsān; notes written in an ancient calligraphy by ʿAllān the Grammarian and al-Naḍr ibn Shumayl; and Ḥadīth authorities, such as Sufyān ibn ʿUyaynah, Sufyān al-Thawri, al-Awzāʿī.Of the scholars, whose handwritten notes on Arabic grammar and philological literature, and other ancient works, he lists are Abū ʿAmr ibn al-ʿAlā', Abū ʿAmr al-Shaybanī, al-Aṣma’ī, Ibn al-Aʿrābī, Sībawayh, al-Farrā’, al-Kisā’ī, Abū al-Aswad (in the handwriting of Yaḥyā ibn Yaʿmar).

Ibn al-Aʿrābī transmitted the authorised edition of the Al-Mufaḍḍalīyāt, one hundred and twenty-eight poems, that begins with a poem of Ta’abbaṭa Sharran Thābit ibn Jābir, where others selected, extended, and reordered the poems. (Note: See Mufaḍḍal, Die Mufaddalījāt (Thorbecke), p. I n., and Mufaḍḍal, Al-Mufaḍḍalīyāt (Lyall), p. 25.)

== See also ==
- List of Arab scientists and scholars
- Encyclopædia Britannica Online

== Bibliography ==
- Dhahabī (al-), Shams al-Dīn Muḥammad ibn Aḥmad ibn ʿUthmān (1948). Ta'rīkh al-Islām. Cairo: Al-Qudsī. OCLC 31817330.
- Flügel, Gustav (1862). Die Grammatischen Schulen der Araber (in German). Leipzig: Brockhaus. p. 653.
- Khallikān (Ibn), Aḥmad ibn Muḥammad (1843). Ibn Khallikān's Biographical Dictionary (tr., Wafayāt al-A'yān wa-Anbā'). Vol. I. Translated by MacGuckin de Slane. London: Oriental Translation Fund of Britain and Ireland.
- Khallikān (Ibn), Aḥmad ibn Muḥammad (1868a). Ibn Khallikān's Biographical Dictionary (tr., Wafayāt al-A'yān wa-Anbā'). Vol. III. Translated by MacGuckin de Slane. London: Oriental Translation Fund of Britain and Ireland. pp. 23–27.
- Khallikān (Ibn), Aḥmad ibn Muḥammad (1868b). Ibn Khallikān's Biographical Dictionary (translation of Wafayāt al-A'yān wa-Anbā'). Vol. III. Translated by MacGuckin de Slane. London: Oriental Translation Fund of Britain and Ireland. pp. 29–30.
- Nadīm (al-), Abū al-Faraj Muḥammad ibn Isḥāq Abū Ya’qūb al-Warrāq (1970). Dodge, Bayard (ed.). The Fihrist of al-Nadim; a tenth-century survey of Muslim culture. New York & London: Columbia University Press.
- Nadīm (al-), Abū al-Faraj Muḥammad ibn Isḥāq (1872). Flügel, Gustav (ed.). Kitāb al-Fihrist (in Arabic). Leipzig: F.C.W. Vogel. p. 653.
- Taghrī-Birdī (Ibn), Abū al-Maḥāsin Yūsuf (1963). Popper, William (ed.). Al-Nujūm al-Zāhirah fī Mulūk Miṣr wa-al-Qāhirah (in Arabic). Vol. III. Cairo: Dār ak-Kutub al-Miṣrīyah. pp. 116, 118.
- al-Ziriklī, Khayr al-Dīn (2007). al-Aʻlām, qāmūs tarājim li-ashhar al-rijāl wa-al-nisāʼ min al-ʻArab wa-al-mustaʻribīn wa-al-mustashriqīn (in Arabic). Vol. VII (17 ed.). Bayrūt: Dār al-ʻIlm lil-Malāyīn. p. 149.
