= Ibn al-Anbari =

Arab philologist and grammarian

- أبوبكر محمد بن القاسم بن محمد بن بشّار الأنباري
- Born: 885; Baghdad, Abbasid Caliphate
- Died: 940; Baghdad, Abbasid Caliphate
- Occupations: Philologist, Grammarian
- Notable work: Sharh al-Qasai'd al-Saba' al-Tiwal al-Jahiliyyat, Al Ha'at fi Kitab Allah
- Parent: Abu Muhammad al-Anbari

Abū Bakr Muḥammad ibn al-Qāsim ibn Muḥammad ibn Bashār al-Anbārī (Arabic: أبوبكر محمد بن القاسم بن محمد بن بشّار الأنباري) (885–940 AD), also known simply as Ibn al-Anbari (ابن الأنباري), was a well known Arab philologist and grammarian of the Abbasid Caliphate.

== Life ==
He was born in Baghdad, where he spent most of his life. According to Hatim Salih al-Damin in his book al-Zāhir fī maʿānī kalimāt al-nās (الظاهر في معاني كلمات الناس), Ibn Al-Anbari received education from many teachers including his father Abu Muhammad al-Anbari(d. 916/917), Abu al-ʽAbbas Thaʽlab (d. 904) and Ibn Duraid (d. 953).

== Works ==
Among his works are the following:

- Sharh al-Qasai'd al-Saba' al-Tiwal al-Jahiliyyat
- Al Ha'at fi Kitab Allah

== See also ==
- List of pre-modern Arab scientists and scholars
