= Sawt Safir al-Bulbul =

Poem attributed to Al-Asma'i (disputed)

- by al-Asmaʿi
- Original title: صوت صفير البلبل (Arabic), translated as the sound of the nightingale's whistle
- Country: Abbasid Caliphate
- Language: Arabic
- Publication date: 8th century
- Pages: 29

Sawt Safir al-Bulbul (Arabic: صَوتُ صَفيرِ البُلْبُلِ, romanized: Ṣawtu ṣafīri l-bulbuli, lit. 'the sound of the nightingale's whistle') is an 8th century Arabic poem attributed to al-Asmaʿi.

== History ==
Al-Asma'i challenged the Abbasid caliph Abu Ja'far al-Mansur, after he had put pressure on poets. He used to memorize the poem the first time he heard it, so he would claim that he had heard it before. After the poet finished reciting the poem, the caliph would recite the poem to him. He had a slave boy who memorized the poem after hearing it twice, so he would bring him to recite it after the poet recited it, and then the caliph. He also had a slave girl who memorized the poem the third time, so he would bring her to recite it after the slave boy to confirm to the poet that the poem had been recited before and was in fact his own composition. He did this with all poets, so the poets turned out disappointed and frustrated, especially since the caliph had set a reward equal to the weight of the poem written on in gold for anyone who could not recite a poem. When al-Asma'i heard of this, he said that the caliph was "tricking and deceiving people", after which he prepared a poem himself, with varied words and strange meanings. He dressed as a bedouin and disguised himself, as he was well-known to the prince.

He entered the prince's presence and said, "I have a poem I would like to recite to you, and I don't think you have heard it before." The prince said, "Tell me what you have." So he recited to him the poem, "The Sound of a Nightingale's Whistle." After he finished reciting the poem, the caliph was unable to remember a single word of it. Then he brought his servant, who also remembered nothing, as he had memorized it after reciting it twice. Then he brought the slave girl, who also remembered nothing. The caliph said, "I will give you the weight of the writing tablet in gold. What did you write it on?" al-Asma'i replied, "I inherited a marble column from my father and inscribed the poem on it. This column is on my camel outside, carried by ten soldiers." They brought him and weighed the entire chest. The vizier said, "O commander of the Faithful, I think it is none other than al-Asma'i." The prince said, "Unveil your veil, O bedouin." The bedouin removed his veil and it was al-Asma'i. The prince said, "Do you treat the Commander of the Faithful like this, O Asma'i?!" He said: O Commander of the Faithful, you have cut off the poets’ livelihood by doing this. The prince said: Return the money, al-Asma’i. He said: I will not return it. The prince said: Return it. al-Asma’i said: On one condition. The prince said: What is it? He said: That you give the poets for what they say and transmit. The prince said: You may have whatever you want.

== Attribution to al-Asma'i ==
Some critics doubt the authenticity of the poem's attribution to al-Asma'i due to linguistic errors and other problems. Historians have also reported that al-Asma'i was in contact with Caliph Harun al-Rashid and was one of his companions, but that it has never been reported that he was a companion of al-Mansur and that if it were true, historians would have mentioned it. Al-Asma'i was born in 121 AH, and Al-Mansur ruled from 136 AH to 158 AH. Thus, Al-Asma'i would have been in his early youth during this era. Based on his biography, at this time he was acquiring knowledge, gathering news, and meeting with bedouins, but had not yet been in contact with any of the prince or caliph. It has also been mentioned that the poem's authenticity is weak and that no one has narrated it except in the book "Alam ul-Nasi bima waqae lil baramikati ma bani al-Abbasi" (Arabic: إعلام الناس بما وقع للبرامكة مع بني العباس, lit. 'Informing people about what happened to the Barmakids with the Abbasids') by Muhammad ibn Diab al-Itlidi.

== Online popularity ==
In early 2025, the poem gained wide popularity on social media, being the background music for the so-called "Tab-Tabi cat", a cat with "a beard and green taqiyah", especially before Ramadan. The original cat is called "Mario", whose Malaysian owner makes videos of him dressing up in different costumes on Instagram.
