= Al Sarraj =

Al Sarraj or El Sarraj (Arabic: السراج) is an Arabic surname.

Notable people with this surname include:

- Abdel Hamid al-Sarraj (1925–2013), Syrian Army officer and political figure, Syrian strong man during the period of United Arab Republic and union of Egypt and Syria
- Abu Nasr as-Sarraj (died 988), Sufi sheikh and ascetic
- Eyad El-Sarraj (1944–2013), Palestinian psychiatrist
- Fayez al-Sarraj (born 1960), Libyan politician
- Mohammad Alsarraj (born 1998), Jordanian squash player
