= Al-Akhfash al-Aṣghar =

Abū al-Maḥāsin ʻAlī ibn Sulaymān ibn al-Faḍl
- الأخفش الأصغر

Personal life
- Born: 235 AH / 849 CE Baghdad
- Died: 315 AH / 927 CE Baghdad
- Notable work(s): Sharḥ Sībawayh; Al-Anwāʾ; Al-Muhadhab
- Other name: Al-Akhfash al-Aṣghar (“the Younger Akhfash”)

Religious life
- Religion: Islam
- Denomination: Sunni
- Profession: Grammarian; Philologist; Lexicographer

Senior posting
- Teacher: Al-Mubarrad; Tha’lab
- Students: Al-Marzubani; al-Maʿfā; al-Jarīrī

Abū al-Maḥāsin Alī ibn Sulaymān ibn al-Faḍl, known as al-Akhfash al-Aṣghar (الأخفش الأصغر) (“the Younger Akhfash”) (849-927) was a Grammarian, lexicographer, and scholar of Arabic language. One of his works is al-Ikhtiyārayn (الاختيارين), which has been edited and published in a modern edition.

== Early life and education ==
Born in 235 AH (≈ 849 CE) in Baghdad. Spent periods in Egypt (from 287 to 300 AH) and also traveled to Halab (Aleppo), before ultimately returning to Baghdad. Lived during the Abbasid period, a period of flourishing of Arabic grammar, linguistic theory, literary criticism, lexicography, etc.

Some of his teachers included Al-Mubarrad and Abu al-ʽAbbās Thaʽlab, among others. And some of his students/people who transmitted from him: Al-Marzubani, al-Ma‘fā and al-Jarīrī.

== Works and contributions ==
He wrote several works. Among his better-known writings:

- Kitāb al-Ikhtiyārayn: ṣanʻah al-Akhfash al-Aṣghar. 1974.
- Sharḥ Sībawayh (شرح سيبويه) - Explanation / Commentary on Sibawayh
- al-Anwāʾ (الأنواء)
- al-Muhadhab (المهذب)

He is credited with grammatical opinions and linguistic positions—some that align with, and some that differ from, the dominant grammarians of his time. For example, his positions on certain grammatical constructions, on the elision (“ḥadhf”) of particles, or his views in Qurʾānic reading/variant recitations were noted.

== Other Akhfashs ==
Besides Al-Akhfash al-Aṣghar (“the Younger Akhfash”), there are at least two other famous scholars with the name Akhfash, distinguished by their epithets al-Akbar (“the Greater / Oldest”) and al-Awsāt (“the Middle”).

== See also ==
- al-Akhfash al-Akbar (the Oldest)
- al-Akhfash al-Awsat (the Middle)
- Akhfash's goat
