= Akhfash's goat =

Parable containing a deceiving goat

Akhfash's goat (بز اخفش; Būzé Akhfash) is a Persian parable in which a philosopher trains his pet goat to nod its head when asked if it has understood a book that it is shown. The term "Akhfash's goat" refers to a person who nods along with a conversation that they do not understand.

== History ==
The term "Akhfash's goat" has different meanings depending on the parable version.

Pawan Sharma's story describes Akhfash as a solitary man who speaks only to his goat. While the reasons for his isolation are left unclear, it is possible Akhfash found himself friendless after being too forceful in his attempts to convince others to accept his beliefs. Akfash may have tried so hard to persuade others that he was left with only his goat to listen to and agree with him.

In another narration, Akhfash is described as a rigid authority figure. In this telling, Akhfash ties a rope to the neck of a goat, attaches the rope to a pulley, and makes the goat nod by pulling on the rope whenever he addresses the public. This was used to demonstrate how subservient and receptive his audiences should be. Under this interpretation "Akhfash's goat" does not describe a fool who agrees without thinking, but is instead used as a stand-in for the poor and downtrodden who are forced to comply with the commands of the powerful.

== See also ==
- al-Akhfash al-Akbar (the Oldest)
- al-Akhfash al-Awsat (the Middle)
- al-Akhfash al-Aṣghar (the Younger)
