= Ghulām Thaʻlab =

Arab linguist

- Born: 874 or 875
- Died: 956 or 957

Academic work
- Era: Medieval Islamic era
- Main interests: Quranic exegesis, Arabic linguistics
- Notable works: Yāqūtat al-ṣirāṭ fī tafsīr gharīb al-Qurʾān, Kitāb fāʼit al-Faṣīḥ, Fāʼit al-Faṣīh, al-ʻ Asharāt fī gharīb al-lughah

Abū ʿUmar al-Zāhid, Muḥammad ibn ʻAbd al-Wāḥid (874/875 – 956/957), known as Ghulām Thaʻlab, was an Islamic scholar known for his contributions to Quranic exegesis and Arabic linguistics.

== Career ==
He was the student of Abu al-ʽAbbās Thaʽlab. His scholarly works include Yāqūtat al-ṣirāṭ fī tafsīr gharīb al-Qurʾān and Kitāb fāʼit al-Faṣīḥ. His approach to language and interpretation have left an impact on Islamic scholarship, as well as on the intellectual history of the Islamic world.

== Literary works ==
Ghulām Thaʻlab authored several works, including:

- Yāqūtat al-ṣirāṭ fī tafsīr gharīb al-Qurʾān: A contribution to Quranic exegesis.
- Kitāb fāʼit al-Faṣīḥ: A work in the field of linguistics. (Note: The Kitāb al-Faṣīḥ is not listed in the Beatty MS is listed last in Flügel. Yāqūt Irshād VI (2), 153 says the composition of al-Ḥasan ibn Dāʽūd al-Raqqī was ascribed to Thaʽlab, who only transcribed it. Suyūṭī Bughyat, p. 173 ascribed it both to al-Ḥasan al-Raqqī and Ibn al-Sikkīt.)
- Fāʼit al-Faṣīh: Another linguistic text.
- al-ʻ Asharāt fī gharīb al-lughah: A work focusing on rare words and expressions in the Arabic language.

== Sources ==
- Khallikān, Aḥmad Ibn-Muḥammad (1843). Ibn Khallikan's Biographical Dictionary. Vol. I. Translated by de Slane, William McGuckin. Paris: Oriental Translation Fund of Great Britain and Ireland. p. 83-5.
- Khallikān, Aḥmad Ibn-Muḥammad (1868). Ibn Khallikan's Biographical Dictionary. Vol. III. Translated by de Slane, William McGuckin. Paris: Oriental Translation Fund of Great Britain and Ireland.
- Nadīm (al-), Abū al-Faraj Muḥammad ibn Isḥāq Abū Yaʽqūb al-Warrāq (1970). Dodge, Bayard (ed.). The Fihrist of al-Nadim; a tenth-century survey of Muslim culture. New York & London: Columbia University Press.
