= Tus Citadel =

Citadel from the Sassanid era in Iran

- ارگ توس
- Interactive map of the Tus Citadel area

General information
- Type: Citadel
- Location: Tus, Iran

The Citadel of Tus (Persian: ارگ توس, romanized: Arg-e Tus) is a Sasanian era citadel, located in Tus, Razavi Khorasan province, Iran.

It is made of brick and is rectangular in shape, having four circular towers at each corner, with two more circular towers in the inner structure. Not much remains of the structure; however, its size is comparable to other large citadels of the Sasanian era.

== See also ==
- List of Iranian castles
- Iranian architecture
