= Abu Muhammad al-Anbari =

Influential Arab philologist of the Abbasid era

- أبومحمد القاسم بن محمد بن بشار الأنباري
- Born: Baghdad, Abbasid Caliphate
- Died: 916/917; Baghdad, Abbasid Caliphate
- Occupation: Philologist
- Notable work: Commentary on Mufaddaliyat
- Children: Abu Bakr al-Anbari

Abū Muḥammad al-Qāsim ibn Muḥammad ibn Bashār al-Anbārī (Arabic: أبومحمد القاسم بن محمد بن بشار الأنباري, d. 916/917) was an influential Arab philologist of the Abbasid era.

== Biography ==
Abu Muhammad year of birth is unknown. He lived most of his life in Baghdad, which at the time was under the rule of the Abbasid Caliphate and was the father of Abu Bakr al-Anbari (d. 940) who also was a famous philologist and grammarian. The majority of Abu Muhammad's lexicographical works are lost. His only surviving work is a commentary written by him on the highly regarded anthology of Arabic poetry known as Mufaḍḍaliyyāt, and it was revised by his son Abu Bakr.

== See also ==
- List of pre-modern Arab scientists and scholars
