= Tus, Iran =

Ancient city in Iran

Tus
- توس (Persian)
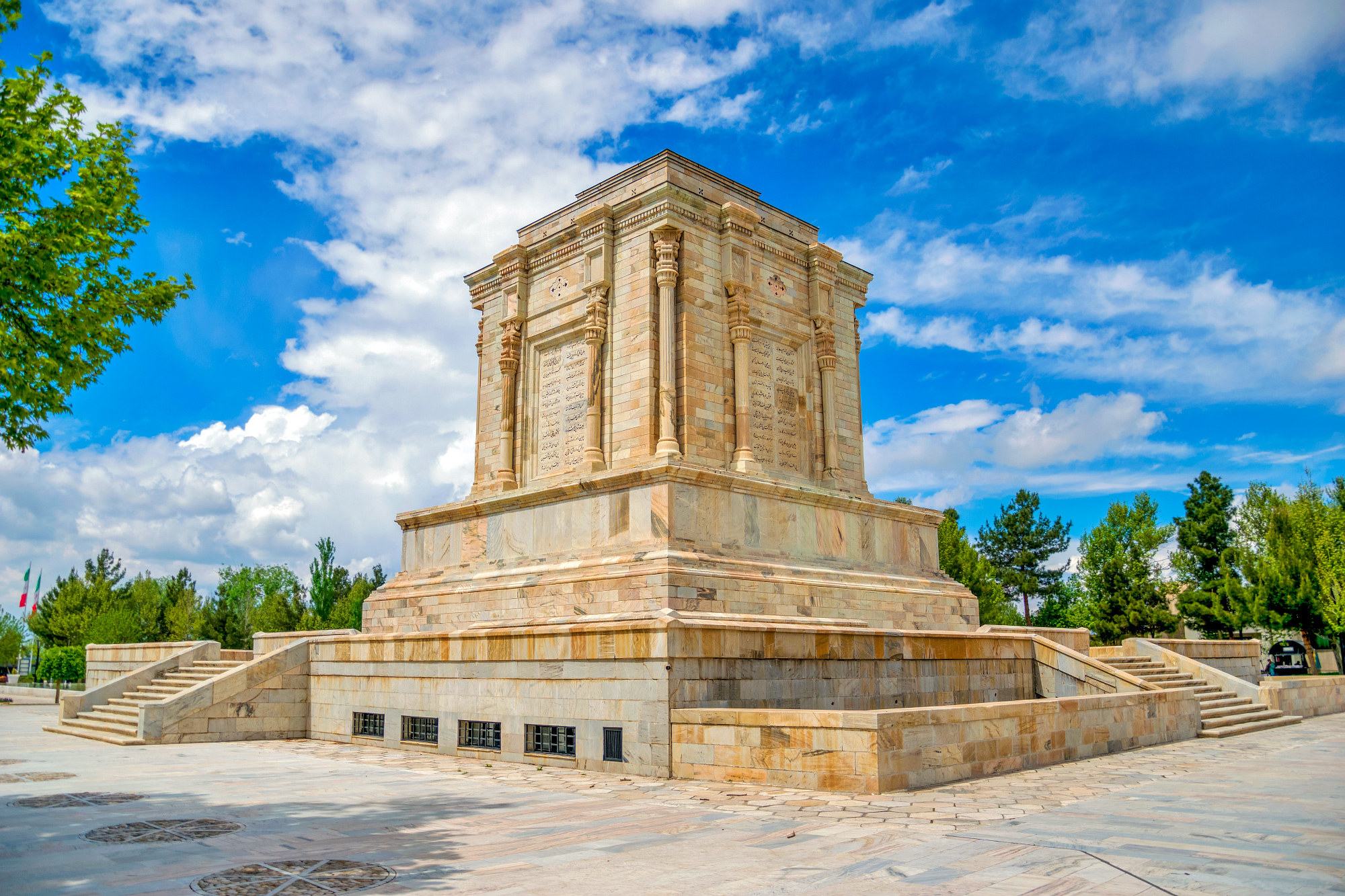
- Tomb of Ferdowsi

- Location of the site
- 36°28′45.0″N 59°30′35.0″E
- Type: Settlement
- Location: Razavi Khorasan Province, Iran

Site notes
- Condition: In ruins

Tus (Persian: توس, romanized: Tūs) is an ancient city in Khorasan near Mashhad, Razavi Khorasan province, Iran. To the ancient Greeks, it was known as Susia (Ancient Greek: Σούσια). It was also known as Tusa. Tus was divided into four cities, Tabran, Radakan, Noan and Teroid, which in combination formed largest city in the region in the fifth century.

== History ==
According to legend Tous son of Nowzar founded the city of Tous in the province of Khorassan next to today's city of Mashhad. It is said that the city of Tous was the capital of Parthia and the residence of King Vishtaspa, who was the first convert to Zoroastrianism. It was captured by Alexander the Great in 330 BCE, and became a key waypoint on the Silk Road.

Tus was taken by the Umayyad caliph Abd al-Malik and remained under Umayyad control until 747, when a subordinate of Abu Muslim Khorasani defeated the Umayyad governor during the Abbasid Revolution. In 809, the Abbasid Caliph Harun al-Rashid fell ill and died in Tus, on his way to solve the unrest in Khorasan. His grave is located in the region.

In the 9th and 10th century, the Persian literature flourished in Khorasan and Transoxiana under Samanid Empire and other Iranian dynasties. The most famous person who has emerged from that area is the poet Ferdowsi, author of the Persian epic Shahnameh, whose mausoleum, built in 1934 in time for the millennium of his birth, dominates the town. Other notable residents of Tus include the theologian, jurist, philosopher and mystic al-Ghazali; early polymath Jābir ibn Hayyān; the poet Asadi Tusi; the powerful Seljuk vizier Nizam al-Mulk; the medieval polymath Nasir al-Din al-Tusi; the prominent Usooli mujtahid (Twelver-Shi'a law interpreter) Shaykh Tusi; and the noted Sufi mystic and historian Abu Nasr as-Sarraj. The Samanid poet Daqiqi was also a native of Tus.

In 1220, Tus was sacked by the Mongol general, Subutai, and a year later Tolui would kill most of its populace, and destroy the tomb of Caliph Harun al-Rashid in the process. Tus was rebuilt in 1239 under the governorship of Kuerguez. The city was attacked again in 1256 by the Mongols during Hulegu's campaign against the Nizari Ismailis.

== Registration of Ferdowsi's Tomb in UNESCO ==
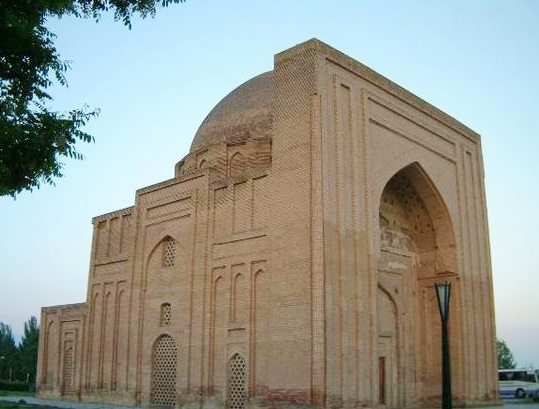
The vast Haruniyeh Dome in Tus. Some say it is the tomb of Ghazali, but this is disputed.

Ferdowsi Tomb has been nationally registered in the Iranian Cultural Heritage and Tourism Organization and at the suggestion of the Cultural Heritage Organization and Ferdowsi Foundation, efforts have been made to pursue the registration of Ferdowsi Tomb in the UNESCO World Heritage List.

== See also ==
- Al-Tusi – a descriptor used for individuals associated with Tus
- Tus Citadel

== Sources ==
- Frye, R. N. (1975). "The Sāmānids". In Frye, R. N. (ed.). The Cambridge History of Iran, Volume 4: From the Arab Invasion to the Saljuqs. Cambridge: Cambridge University Press. pp. 136–161. ISBN 978-0-521-20093-6.
- Litvinsky, Ahmad Hasan Dani (1998). History of Civilizations of Central Asia: Age of Achievement, A.D. 750 to the end of the 15th-century. UNESCO. ISBN 9789231032110.
- Khaleghi-Motlagh, Djalal (1993). "DAQĪQĪ, ABŪ MANṢŪR AḤMAD". Encyclopaedia Iranica, Vol. VI, Fasc. 6. pp. 661–662.
