= Al-Akhfash al-Awsat =

Akhfash al‐Awsāt
- الأخفش الأوسط
- Born: Balkh (Greater Khurāsān)
- Died: 215 AH (≈ 830–831 CE); Basra
- Occupations: Grammarian; scholar of Arabic grammar and linguistics

Academic background
- Influences: Sibawayh

Academic work
- Era: Early Abbasid / Classical Arabic grammar period
- Main interests: Qurʾānic exegesis; Arabic grammar; morphology; poetic rhyme
- Notable works: Maʿānī al-Qurʾān, al-Qawāfī, etc.
- Influenced: Later grammarians; exegetes studying Qurʾān meanings

Abū al-Ḥasan Saʿīd ibn Masʿadah al-Akhfash al-Awsaṭ (Arabic: أبو الحسن سعيد بن مسعدة الأخفش الأوسط), often shortened to Akhfash al-Awsaṭ (“the middle Akhfash”), was an early Arabic grammarian, linguist, and scholar of maʿānī al-Qurʾān (Meanings of the Qurʾān). He died approximately in 215 AH (ca. 830 CE).

== Scholarly contributions ==
Akhfash made significant contributions to Arabic grammar, Qurʾānic exegesis (especially meanings of the Qurʾān), and linguistic theory. Some of his works and areas of study include:

- Kitāb Maʿānī al-Qurʾān: A work on the meanings of Qurʾānic vocabulary and style. It is one of the better-known surviving works.
- Kitāb al-Qawāfī: A work on poetic rhymes (qawāfī).
- كتاب العروض. 1989.

He held opinions on grammatical and morphological matters, some of which are preserved in his works, others through later scholars discussing or transmitting his positions. For example, there is scholarship on “تعدد الآراء النحوية والصرفية في المسألة الواحدة عند الأخفش الأوسط” (the multiplicity of grammatical and morphological views in the same issue in the work or attributed to al-Awsat).

He also addressed gender in Arabic (e.g. masculine and feminine), as indicated by the work al-Mudhakkar wa-al-mu’annath lil-Akhfash al-Awsaṭ based on selections from Maʿānī al-Qurʾān.

== Other Akhfashs ==
Besides Akhfash al-Awsāt (“the Middle Akhfash”), there are at least two other famous scholars with the name Akhfash, distinguished by their epithets al-Akbar (the Older / Greater) and al-Aṣghar (the Younger / Smaller).

== See also ==
- al-Akhfash al-Akbar (the Oldest)
- al-Akhfash al-Aṣghar (the Younger)
- Akhfash's goat
