= Abu Nasr as-Sarraj =

Abū Naṣr ʿAbd Allāh ibn ʿAlī al-Sarrāj (in Arabic: أبو نصرعبدالله ابن علي السرَّاج, in Persian: ابونصر عبدالله بن علی بن محمد بن یحیی سرّاج) (died 988) was a Sunni sheikh and ascetic born in Tūs, Iran. He traveled widely in the Islamic world, having lived in cities as diverse as Cairo, Tabriz, Ramla, Baghdad, Damascus, Basra, and Nishapur. He is best known for his seminal Kitāb al-luma (Book of Light), which is considered an encyclopedia of the history of early Sufism.

== Kitāb al-luma' ==
Sarrāj is best known for his work, Kitāb al-luma' fi'l-taṣawwuf (كتاب اللمع في التصوف, The Book of Light Flashes on Sufism), one of the earliest surveys of Sufism in which he affirms Sufism as an "authentic religious discipline" before he delves into accounting the different modes of knowing in Sufism. His book is considered an encyclopedia for the history of Islamic Sufism, different modes of knowing within Sufism, and Sufi concepts and sayings. The book was very successful in being one of the first "authoritative documentary" surveys, forged by first-hand information from thirty-nine Sufi authorities on a total of around 200 Sufis. Sarrāj also sought in the book to demonstrate Sufism's compatibility with mainstream Sunni Islam.

== Other works ==
In addition to his scholarly activities, Sarrāj was highly active in the early Sufi community. He was the head of the order of dervishes in Baghdad, and was thus responsible for the day-to-day management of the Sufi community in the Abbasid capital. This position of power led him to become the sheikh (teacher) of many prominent early Sufis, including Abu al-Fadl ibn al-Hasan al-Sarakhsi, who was himself the sheikh of Abū-Sa'īd Abul-Khayr, al-Qushayri, and Ja'far al-Khaldi. Similarly, Sarrāj was considered one of the foremost faqaha' (legal scholars) in early Sufism. Though his prominence in the early Sufi community was mainly a result of his scholarship and knowledge of the sharia (Islamic law), it also owed in part to his lineage, as he was descended from a long line of ascetics.
