= Al-Asmaʿi =

Basra school Arab scholar and grammarian (c.740–828/833)

Abu Saeed ʿAbd al-Malik b. Quraib al-Aṣmaʿī Al-bahili
- أبو سعيد عبد الملك ابن قريب الأصمعي الباهلي
- Born: 740; Basra, Iraq
- Died: 828 (aged 87–88); Basra

Academic background
- Influences: Al-Khalil ibn Ahmad al-Farahidi, Abū 'Amr ibn al-'Ala'

Academic work
- Era: Islamic Golden Age (Abbasid era)
- Main interests: grammar, poetry, natural science, zoology
- Notable works: Asma'iyyat, Fuḥūlat al-Shu’arā’, Book of Distinction, the Book of the Wild Animals, The sound of the Nightingale's whisle

Al-Asmaʿi (أبو سعيد عبد الملك ابن قريب الأصمعي, ʿAbd al-Malik ibn Qurayb al-Aṣmaʿī ; (Note: Khallikān (II, 123)) c. 740–828/833), or Asmai was an Arab philologist and one of three leading Arabic grammarians of the Basra school. At the court of the Abbasid caliph, Hārūn al-Rashīd, as polymath and prolific author on philology, poetry, genealogy, and natural science, he pioneered zoology studies in animal-human anatomical science. He compiled an important poetry anthology, the Asma'iyyat, and was credited with composing an epic on the life of Antarah ibn Shaddad. A protégé of Al-Khalil ibn Ahmad al-Farahidi and Abu 'Amr ibn al-'Ala', he was a contemporary and rival of Abū ʿUbaidah and Sibawayhi also of the Basran school.

Ibn Isḥaq al-Nadīm's c.10th biography of al-Aṣma’ī follows the “isnad” narrative or ‘chain-of-transmission’ tradition. Al-Nadīm reports Abū ‘Abd Allāh ibn Muqlah's written report (Note: al-Ḥasan ibn ‘Ali ibn Muqlah, Abī ‘Abd Allāh; brother of the vizier of al-Muqtadir and al-Qāhir, Muḥammad ibn ‘Alī, calligrapher) of Tha’lab's report, giving Al-Aṣma’ī‘s full name as ’’‘Abd al-Malik ibn Qurayb ibn ‘Abd al-Malik ibn ‘Ali ibn Aṣma’ī ibn Muẓahhir ibn ‘Amr ibn ‘Abd Allah al-Bāhilī.’’’

The c.13th biographer Ibn Khallikān calls al-Aṣmaʿī “a complete master of the Arabic language,” and “the most eminent of all transmitters of the oral history and rare expressions of the language.”. His account includes collected anecdotes of numerous adventures.

== Biography ==
His father was Qurayb Abū Bakr from ‘Āṣim and his son was Sa’īd. He belonged to the family of the poet Abū ‘Uyaynah al-Muhallabī. (Note: Abū ibn Muḥammad ibn Abi ‘Uyaynah (late 8th -early 9th century).) Al-Aṣma’ī was descended from Adnān and the tribe of Bahila. Growing up studying in Basra, he spent all of his wealth on seeking knowledge. A greengrocer at the end of his alley would chide him to just get a job and give up his books, so he set out very early and returned late to avoid him. Later, the governor of Basra brought him to the notice of the caliph, Harun al-Rashid, who made him tutor to his sons, Al-Amin and Al-Ma'mun. It was said Al-Rashid was an insomniac, and that he once held an all-night discussion with al-Asmaʿi on pre-Islamic and early Arabic poetry. Al-Aṣma’ī was popular with the influential Barmakid viziers and acquired wealth as a property owner in Basra. Some of his protégés attained high rank as literary men. Among his students was the noted musician Ishaq al-Mawsili. After finishing the education of al-Rashid's children, he asked the caliph to order the people of Basra to all greet him on his return and honor him after that. For three days the city greeted him until he met the greengrocer again and hired him as a wakeel.

His ambitious aim to catalogue the complete Arabic language in its purest form, led to a period he spent roaming with desert Bedouin tribes, observing and recording their speech patterns.

== Rivalry between Al-Aṣma’ī and Abū ‘Ubaida ==
His great critic Abū ʿUbaida was a member of the Shu'ubiyya movement, a chiefly Persian cultural movement. Al-Aṣma’ī, as an Arab nationalist and champion of the Arabic language, rejected foreign linguistic and literary influences.

Al-Nadīm cites a report of Abū ‘Ubaida that al-Aṣma’ī claimed his father travelled on a horse of Salm ibn Qutaybah. (Note: Salm ibn Qutaybah ibn Muslim al-Bāhilī. (d.766); governor of al-Baṣrah and later of al-Rayy during the reign of al-Manṣūr.) Abū ‘Ubaida had exclaimed,

“Praise be to Allāh and thanks to Allāh, for Allāh is greater [than His creatures]. One boasting of what he does not own is like a person wearing a false robe and, by Allāh the father of al-Aṣma’ī never owned any animal other than the one inside of his robe!"

Ubaida’s reference here to al-Asma’ī’s father seems to relate to the story given by Khallikān about al-Asma’ī’s grandfather, Alī ibn Asmā, who had lost his fingers in punishment for theft.

A corollary to 'Ubaida’s anecdote is related by Khallikān, that once al-Faḍl Ibn Rabī, the vizier to caliph al-Rashid, had brought forth his horse and asked both Al-Aṣma’ī and Abū 'Ubaida (who had written extensively on the horse) to identify each part of its anatomy. Abū 'Ubaida excused himself from the challenge, saying that he was an expert on Bedouin culture not a farrier; When al-Aṣma’ī then grabbed the horse by the mane, named each part of its body while, at the same time, reciting the Bedouin verses that authenticated each term as proper to the Arabic lexicon, Al-Faḍl had rewarded him the horse. Whenever after this, Aṣma’ī visited Ubaida he rode his horse. Al-Aṣma’ī, was a perennial bachelor and when Yahya, a Barmakid vizier of the caliph, presented him with the gift of a slave girl, the girl was so repulsed by Al-Aṣma’ī's appearance, Yahya bought her back.

Shaykh Abū Sa’īd reported that Abū al-‘Abbas al-Mubarrad had said al-Aṣma’ī and Abū ‘Ubaida were equal in poetry and rhetoric, but where Abū ‘Ubaida excelled in genealogy, al-Aṣma’ī excelled in grammar – “al-Aṣma’ī, [like] a nightingale [would] charm them with his melodies”

Al-Aṣma’ī died, aged 88 years in Baṣra (Note: Al-Nadīm and Khallikān both cite Basra, however Khallikān reports a disputed claim that he died in Merv, (now in Turkmenistan). He died either at Basra, or at Baghdad,), ca. 213/828 - 217/832, in the company of the blind poet and satirist Abū al-‘Aynā'. (Note: Abū al-‘Aynā Muḥammad ibn al-Qāsim lived at Baghdad died at al-Basrah in 895/896.) His funeral prayers were said by his nephew and poet ‘Abd al-Raḥmān: (Note: ‘Abd al-Raḥmān Abū Muḥammad Abū al-Ḥasan, was said to have transmitted his uncle's work.) "To Allāh we belong and to Him we return." (Note: Qur'ān 2:156)

== Works ==
Al-Aṣma’ī's magnum opus Asma'iyyat, is a unique primary source of early Arabic poetry and was collected and republished in the modern era, by the German orientalist Wilhelm Ahlwardt. Al-Sayyid Muʻaẓẓam Ḥusain's English translation of selected poems taken from both the Aṣma’īyyat and Mufaddaliyyat- the larger important source of pre-Islamic Arabic poetry- is available online. Most other existing collections were compiled by al-Aṣma’ī's students based on the principles he taught.

One of Al-Aṣma’ī's most famous works is the 9th century poem Sawt Safir al-Bulbul (صوت صفير البلبل), made to challenge the Abbasid caliph. However, historians still argue about whether he was the poet or not.

Of al-Aṣma’ī's prose works listed in the Fihrist about half a dozen are extant. These include the Book of Distinction, the Book of the Wild Animals, the Book of the Horse, and the Book of the Sheep, and Fuḥūlat al-Shu‘arā a pioneering work of Arabic literary criticism.

- Disposition of Man or Humanity (كتاب خلق الانسان) - Kitab Khalaq al-Insan
- Categories (كتاب الاجناس)
- Al-Anwā’ (كتاب الانواء) – “Influence of the stars on the weather”
- Marking with the Hamzah) (كتاب الهمز)
- Short and Long (كتاب المقصور والممدود)
- Distinction, or of Rare Animals (كتاب الفرق) - Kitab al-Farq
- Eternal Attributes [of God] (كتاب الصفات)
- Gates (Note: Prob. of Heaven; Qur’ān 38: 50)) (كتاب الابواب) or Merit (كتاب الاثواب)
- Al-Maysir and al-Qidāḥ (Note: Al-maysir was the drawing of arrows to obtain part of a slaughtered animal; see Richardson, Dictionary, p. 1542. AI-qidāḥ were arrows without heads used for fortune telling and gambling.) (كتاب الميسى والقداح)
- Disposition of the Horse (كتاب خلق الفرس)
- Horses (كتاب الخيل) - Kitāb al-Khail
- The Camel (كتاب الابل) - Kitāb al-Ibil
- Sheep (كتاب الشاء) - Kitāb al-Shā
- Tents and Houses (كتاب الاهبية والبيوت)
- Wild Beasts (كتاب الوحوش) - Kitab al-Wuhush
- Times (كتاب الاوقات)
- Fa‘ala wa-Af‘ala [gram.]) (كتاب فعل وافعل)
- Proverbs (كتاب الامثال)
- Antonyms (كتاب الاضداد)
- Pronunciations/Dialects (كتاب الالفاظ)
- Weapons (كتاب السلاح)
- Languages/Vernaculars (كتاب اللغات)
- Etymology (كتاب الاشتقاق)
- Rare Words (كتاب النوادر)
- Origins of Words (كتاب اصول الكلام)
- Change and Substitution [gram.] (كتاب القلب والابدال)
- The Arabian Peninsula (كتاب جزيرة العرب)
- The Utterance/Pail) (كتاب الدلو)
- Migration (كتاب الرحل)
- The Meaning of Poetry (كتاب معانى الشعر)
- Infinitive/Verbal Noun (كتاب مصادر)
- The Six Poems (Note: Omitted in Beatty MS.) (كتاب القسائد الست)
- Rajaz Poems (كتاب الاراجيز)
- Date Palm/Creed (كتاب النحلة)
- Plants and Trees (كتاب النبات والشجر) (Note: botanical work identifying 276 plants or plant genus; and plants from across the Arabian Peninsula.)
- The Land Tax (كتاب الخراج)
- Synonyms (كتاب ما اتفق لفظه واختلف معناه)
- The Strange in the Ḥadīth (Note: In the hand of al-Sukkarī, about 200 folios) (كتاب غريب الحديث نحو ماثتين ورقة رايتة بخط السكرى)
- The Saddle, Bridle, Halter and Horse Shoe (Note: This title is incorrect in Flügel text and the word “halter" is badly written in Beatty MS. Perhaps al-burs, a kind of wooden camel halter.) (كتاب السرج والنجام * والشوى والنعال)
- The Strange in the Ḥadīth-Uncultured Words (كتاب غريب الحديث والكلام الوحشى)
- Rare Forms of the Arabians/Inflections/Declensions (كتاب نوادر الاعراب)
- Waters of the Arabs (كتاب مياة العرب)
- Genealogy (Note: Omitted in Beatty MS.) (كتاب النسب)
- Vocal Sounds (Note: Omitted in Beatty MS.) (كتاب الاصوات)
- Masculine and Feminine (كتاب المذكر والمؤنث)
- The Seasons كتاب المواسم (Note: Omitted in Beatty MS.)

== Contribution to early Arabic literature ==
Al-Aṣma’ī was among a group of scholars who edited and recited the Pre-lslāmic and Islāmic poets of the Arab tribes up to the era of the Banū al-‘Abbās (Note: For translations of some of these ancient poems, Mufaḍḍal and Abū Tammām)

He memorised thousands of verses of rajaz poetry and edited a substantial portion of the canon of Arab poets, but produced little poetry of his own. He met criticism for neglecting the ‘rare forms’ (nawādir - نوادر) and lack of care in his abridgments. (Note: note on various translation in Flügel and Beatty MS.)

=== List of edited poets ===
- Al-Nābighah al-Dhubyānī (Note: Nickname of many poets. (i) Al-Nābighah al-Dhubyānī, Ziyād ibn Mu‘āwiyah, a protégé of the princes of al-Ḥīrah and Ghassān. (ii) Al-Nābighah, ‘Abd Allāh ibn. Al-Mukhāriq. A man of the Banū Shaybān, patronized by the caliphs ‘Abd al-MaIik and al-Walīd (685-715).) (whom he also abridged)
- Al-Ḥuṭay’ah (Note: Ḥuṭay’ah, Abū Mulaykah Jarwal ibn Aws. poet in the time of Mu’āwiyah (661-680).)
- Al-Nābighah al-Ja‘dī (Note: Al-Ja‘dī, or al-Ju‘dī became a Muslim and a poet of early Islam.)
- Labīd ibn Rabī‘ah al-‘Āmirī (Note: Wrote fourth poem of the Mu‘alaqāt, became a Companion of the Prophet, died after 661.)
- Tamīm ibn Ubayy ibn Muqbil (Note: Abū Ka‘b; Pre-Islamic poet, became a Muslim, lived to age of about a 100 years.)
- Durayd ibn al-Ṣimmah (Note: Tribal hero and poet, just before Islām.)
- Muhalhil ibn Rabī‘ah (Note: Pre-Islāmic poet, uncle of the great Imru’ al-Qays ibn Ḥujr ibn al-Ḥārith, possibly first to use the al-qaṣīdah (ode).)
- Al-A‘shā al-Kabīr, Maymūn ibn Qays, Abū Baṣīr (Note: Poet, joined the Prophet late in life, died at al-Yamāmah.): (Note: Almost certainly Maymūn ibn Qays, called al-Kabīr (“the elder” or "the great”))
- A‘shā Bāhilah ‘Amir ibn al-Ḥārith (Note: Poet, lived just before Islām.)
- Mutammim ibn Nuwayrah (Note: Poet, became a Muslim, was deformed, lived in humiliation due to his brother’s disloyalty. Died in reign of second caliph.) (Note: Only Flügel correct.)
- Bishr ibn Abī Khāzim (Note: Bishr ibn Ḥāzim in Beatty MS. Tribal poet, late C6th.) (Note: Beatty MS has Bishr ibn Ḥāzim.)
- Al-Zibraqān ibn Badr al-Tamīmī (Note: Poet and Companion of the Prophet, died 665.) (Note: Omitted in Flügel.)
- Al-Mutalammis Jarīr ibn ‘Abd al-Masīḥ (Note: Poet of al-Ḥīrah, late C6th.)
- Ḥumayd ibn Thawr al-Rājiz (Note: Poet lived after the Prophet, before first caliph.) (Note: Flügel has “al-Rabbāḥī”, Beatty and Tonk MSS “al-Rājiz.”)
- Ḥumayd al-Arqaṭ (Note: Poet lived in caliphate of ‘Abd al-Malik (685-705).)
- Suhaym ibn Wathīl al-Riyāḥī (Note: Early Islamic period poet. Beatty MS calls his father Wūthīl; Flügel adds “al-Āmilī” to his name.)
- Urwah ibn al-Ward (Note: (or Ṣu‘lūk) Pre-Islamic poet famed for charity.)
- ‘Amr ibn Sha’s (Note: Pre-Islāmic poet, famously generous.) (Note: Poet; Flügel probably correctly has Ibn Habib, meaning Muhammad ibn Ḥabīb, but Beatty and Tonk MSS have the editor Ibn Jundub)
- Al-Namir ibn Tawlab (Note: Pre-Islāmic poet, became a Muslim.) (Note: Name correct in Flügel, garbled in Beatty and Tonk MSS.)
- Ubayd Allāh ibn Qays al-Ruqayyāt (Note: Nicknamed ‘al-Ruqayyāt’ after three women named Ruqayyah; one of the five great Quraysh poets. He fought for Ibn al-Zubayr and died ca.704.)
- Muḍarras ibn Rib‘ī (Note: Early poet of the Banū Asad Tribe., name given is Mudarris.)
- Abū Ḥayyah al-Numayrī (Note: Poet of the Numayr Tribe, lived in southern Iraq, met many caliphs. (d.800.)) (Note: Beatty MS inserts muḥdath (“originator”), or muhaddith (“relator”) here.)
- Al-Kumayt ibn Ma‘rūf (Note: Poet of a Bedouin family of poets, early period of Islam.)
- Al-‘Ajjāj al-Rājaz, Abū Shāthā’ ‘Abd Allāh ibn Ru’bah. (Note: Poet of al-Baṣrah, master of rajaz verse. Died early C8th.). For his son, see Ru’bah.
- Ru’bah ibn al-‘Ajjāj, called Abū Muḥammad Ru’bah ibn ‘Abd Allāh (Note: Authority on rajaz poetry and Arab folklore; lived at al-Baṣrah; died as a fugitive soon after 763.), was a contemporary of al-Aṣma’ī whose poetry al-Aṣma’ī recited.
- Jarīr ibn ‘Aṭīyah (Note: His lineage was a branch of the Tamīm Tribe; he was the famous court poet, first with caliph al-Ḥajjāj in Iraq, after with ‘Abd al-Mālik (685-705) at Damascus. He died in 728/729.) al-Aṣma’ī was among group of editors who included Abū ‘Amr [al-Shaybānī], and Ibn al-Sikkīt. (Note: For life of Aṣma’ī, see Ibn Khallikān, Biographical Dictionary, translated from the Arabic by McG. de Slane (Paris and London, 1842), vol. ii. pp. 123-127. *For his work as a grammarian, G. Flügel, Die grammatischen Schulen der Araber (Leipzig, 1862), pp. 72-80.)

== See also ==
- List of Arab scientists and scholars
- Encyclopædia Britannica Online

== Sources ==
- Adamec, Ludwig W (2009). The A to Z of Islam. Lanham: Scarecrow Press. ISBN 9780810871601.
- Aṣma’ī (al-), Abū Sa’īd ‘Abd al-Malik ibn Qurayb (1953). Fuḥūlat al-Shu'arā'. Cairo: Al-Mūnīrīyah Press.
- Baghdādī (al-), Abd al-Qadir ibn ‘Umar (1882). Maiman, A. A. (ed.). Khizānat al-Adah wa Lubb Luhāb Lisan al-'Arab. Vol. 4. Cairo: Dār al-‘Uṣūr li-al-Ṭab‘ wa-al-Nashr.
- Baghdādī (al-), Abd al-Qadir ibn ‘Umar (1927). Maiman, A. A. (ed.). Khizānat al-Adah, Iqlīd al-Khizāna (Index). Lahore: University of the Punjab.
- Carter, M.G. (2004). Sibawayh, Part of the Makers of Islamic Civilization series. London: I.B. Tauris. ISBN 9781850436713.
- Caskel, W. (1960). "Bahila". In Lewis, B.; Pellat, Ch.; Schacht, J. (eds.). The Encyclopedia of Islam, Volume 1 A-B (2nd ed.). Leiden: Brill. ISBN 90-04-08114-3.
- Chejne, Anwar G. (1969). The Arabic Language: Its Role in History. Minneapolis: University of Minnesota Press. ISBN 9780816657254.
- Dodge, Bayard (1970). The Fihrist of al-Nadim, A Tenth-Century Survey of Muslim Culture. Vol. 1. New York & London: Columbia University Press.
- Fahd, Toufic (1996). "Botany and agriculture". In Roshdi, Rasheed (ed.). Encyclopedia of the History of Arabic Science, Technology, Alchemy and Life Sciences. Vol. 3. London: Routledge. ISBN 0415124123.
- Flügel, Gustav (1862). Die grammatischen Schulen der Araber. Leipzig: Brockhaus.
- Ḥusain, al-Sayyid Muʻaẓẓam (1938). "Early Arabic Odes chosen from the selections of al-Mufaḍḍal and al-Aṣma'ī". Bulletin (University of Dacca). XIX. Delhi: Latifi Press.
- Iṣbahānī (al-), Abū al-Faraj ‘Alī ibn al-Ḥusayn (1868) [1868]. Kitāb al-Aghānī. Vol. 20. Cairo: Būlāq Press.
- Iṣbahānī (1888). Kitāb al-Aghānī. Vol. 21. Leiden: Brill.
- Iṣbahānī (1900). Tables Alphabétiques. Leiden: Brill.
- Jahiz (al-), Abu 'Uthman 'Amr ibn Bahr (1955). Pellat, Charles (ed.). Kitāb al-Qawl fī al-Bighā (Le Livre des mulets). Cairo: Al-Ḥalabī Press.
- Khallikān (Ibn), Aḥmad ibn Muḥammad (1843). Biographical Dictionary (Wafayāt al-A'yān wa-Anbā Abnā' al-Zamān). Vol. I–III. Translated by de Slane, William McGuckin. Paris and London: W.H. Allen.
- Khallikān (Ibn), Aḥmad ibn Muḥammad (1871). Ibn Khallikān's Biographical Dictionary (Wafayāt al-A'yān wa-Anbā Abnā' al-Zamān). Vol. 4. London: W.H. Allen.
- Al-khateeb Shehada, Housni (2012). Mamluks and Animals: Veterinary Medicine in Medieval Islam; of Sir Henry Wellcome Asian Series. Vol. 11. Leiden: Brill Publishers. ISBN 97-89-00423-4055.
- Mas‘ūdī (al-), Abū al-Ḥasan ‘Ali ibn al-Ḥusayn (1865). Kitāb Murūj al-Dhahab wa-Ma'ādin al-Jawhar/Les Prairies d'or (Ar. text with Fr. transl.) (in Arabic and French). Vol. 4. Translated by de Meynard, C. Barbier; de Courteile, Pavet. Paris: Imprimerie impériale.
- Mas‘ūdī (al-), Abū al-Ḥasan ‘Ali ibn al-Ḥusayn (1871). Kitāb Murūj al-Dhahab. Vol. 9. Paris: Imprimerie nationale.
- Merriam-Webster's Encyclopedia Of Literature. Merriam-Webster. 1995. ISBN 97-80-87779-0426.
- Mufaḍḍal (al-), ibn al-Ḍabbī (1885). Thorbecke, Heinrich (ed.). Die Mufaddalījāt. Leipzig: Brockhaus.
- Mufaḍḍal (al-), ibn al-Ḍabbī (1890). Shākir, Aḥmad Muḥammad; Hārūn, ‘Abd al-Salām Muḥammad (eds.). Al-Mufaddalīyāt. Cairo: Al-Ma’ārif Press.
- Mufaḍḍal (al-), ibn al-Ḍabbī (1921) [1918]. Lyall, Charles J. (ed.). Die Mufaddalīyāt: An Anthology of Ancient Arabian Odes (Ar. text with En. transl.). Vol. 2. Translated by Lyall, Charles J. London: Clarendon Press.
- Mufaḍḍal (al-), ibn al-Ḍabbī (1924). Bevan, A. A. (ed.). Al-Mufaddalīyāt (Index). Vol. III. London: Luzac (E. J. W. Gibb Memorial New Series).
- Nasser, Shady (2012). The Transmission of the Variant Readings of the Qurʾān: The Problem of Tawātur and the Emergence of Shawādhdh. Leiden: Brill Publishers. ISBN 9789004241794.
- Nawawī (al-), Abū Zakarīyā Yaḥyā (1847) [1842]. Wüstenfeld, Ferdinand (ed.). Kitāb Tahdhīb al-Asmā' (The Biographical Dictionary of Illustrious Men) (in Arabic). Göttingen: London Society for the Publication of Oriental Texts.
- Nicholson, Reynold Aleyne (1907). A Literary History of the Arabs. London: T. Fisher Unwin.
- Ouyang, Wen-chin (1997). Literary Criticism in Medieval Arabic-Islamic Culture: The Making of a Tradition. Edinburgh: Edinburgh University Press. ISBN 9780748608973.
- Qutaybah (Ibn), Abū Muḥammad ‘Abd Allāh (1956). Kitāb al-Anwā'. Hyderabad: Dā’irat al-Ma‘ārif al-‘Uthmānīyah.
- Qutaybah (Ibn) (1949). Kitāb al-Ma'ānī al-Kabīr fī Abyāt al-Ma'ānī. Vol. 2. Hyderabad: Dā’irat al-Ma‘ārif al-‘Uthmānīyah.
- Qutaybah (Ibn) (1850). Wüstenfeld, Ferdinand (ed.). Kitāb al-Ma'ārif (Ibn Coteiba's Handbuch de Geschichte). Gottingen: Vandenhoek und Ruprecht.
- Qutaybah (Ibn) (1960). ‘Ukāshah, Tharwat (ed.). Kitāb al-Ma'ārif (A new ed.). Cairo: Dār al-Kutub.
- Qutaybah (Ibn) (1904). de Goeje, Michael Jan (ed.). Kitab al-Shi'r wa-al-Shu'arā' (Liber Poësie et Poëtarum). Leiden: Brill.
- Qutaybah (Ibn) (1930) [1925]. Kitab 'Uyūn al-Akhbār. Vol. 4. Cairo: Dār al-Kutub al-Miṣrīyah.
- Ṭabārī (al-), Muḥammad ibn Jarīr (1888) [1659]. de Goeje, M. J. (ed.). Tarīkh al-Rusul wa-al-Mulūk (Annales). Vol. 7. Leiden: Brill publishers.
- Ṭabarī (al-), Muḥammad ibn Jarīr (1901). de Goeje, M. J. (ed.). Ta'rīkh al-Rusul wa-al-Mulūk (Annales). Vol. 14. Leiden: Brill.
- Ṭabarī (al-) (1960). Abū al-Faḍl Ibrāhīm (ed.). Ta'rīkh. Vol. 7. Cairo: Dār al-Ma’ārif.
- Tammām (Abū), Ḥabīb ibn Aws (1846). Rückert, Friedrich (ed.). Al-Ḥamāsah (translation of Dīwān al-Ḥamāsah). Stuttgart: Liesching.
- Thatcher, Griffithes Wheeler. Aṣma'ī. Vol. 1.
- Van Gelder, G. J. H. (1982). Beyond the Line: Classical Arabic Literary Critics on the Coherence and Unity of the Poem: of Studies in Arabic literature: Supplements to the Journal of Arabic Literature. Vol. 8. Leiden: Brill. ISBN 9789004068544.
- Versteegh, Kees (1997). The Arabic Linguistic Tradition; Part of Landmarks in Linguistic Thought series. Vol. 3. New York: Routledge. ISBN 9780415157575.
- Versteegh, Kees (1977). Greek Elements in Arabic Linguistic Thinking; Studies in Semitic languages and linguistics. Vol. 7. Leiden: Brill Publishers. ISBN 9789004048553.
- Ziriklī (al-), Khayr al-Dīn (1959) [1954]. Al-A'lām. Vol. 10 (2 ed.). Cairo.
- Zubaydī (al-), Abū Bakr Muḥammad ibn al-Ḥasan (1984) [1954]. Ibrāhīm, Muḥammad (ed.). Ṭabaqāt al-Naḥwīyīn wa-al-Lughawīyīn (in Arabic). Cairo: Al-Khanjī.
