= Yaqub Ibn as-Sikkit =

9th-century Arab scholar, poet and grammarian

Sikkīt (Ibn al-), Abū Yūsuf Ya‘qūb ibn Isḥāq
- Born: Dawraq, Ahwaz
- Died: c. 857/861; Baghdād, Iraq
- Cause of death: Various accounts; injuries inflicted as punishment.

Academic background
- Education: Kufah Grammarian School
- Influences: Al-Asmaʿi, Abū Ubaidah, al-Farrā’

Academic work
- Era: Abbāsid Caliph al-Mutawakkil (rn. 847 – 861)
- School or tradition: Shia
- Main interests: philology, Arabic grammar, Arabic poetry
- Notable works: Al-Alfāz (‘Pronunciations’, or ‘Dialects’), Iṣlāh al-Mantiq (‘Correction of Logic’);
- Influenced: al-Dinawari

Abū Yūsuf Ya‘qūb Ibn as-Sikkīt (Note: Ibn as-Sikkīt; “the son of the taciturn”; Khallikān, IV, p.293) (ابو يوسف يعقوب ابن السكيت) was a Persian philologist tutor to the son of the Abbasid caliph Al-Mutawakkil and a great grammarian and scholar of poetry of the al-Kūfah school. He was punished on the orders of the caliph and died between 857 and 861.

== Life ==
He was the son of al-Sikkīt, a philologist of the Kūfī school of grammar, a man of science, and an associate of the scholars al-Kisā’ī and al-Farrā’. Where the father excelled in poetry and linguistics, the son excelled in grammar. (Note: In this account al-Nadim cites the authority of Abū al-‘Abbas Tha‘lab, a grammarian-traditionist of Kūfah.) His father originated from the village of Dawraq, Ahwaz Khuzestan (Iran), (Note: The inhabitants of Khuzestan were viewed as avaricious, backward and vile by the urban elites of Kūfah.) (Note: See Hamawī (al-), Yaqut (وأعراضهُمُ سُودُ / دناننيرهُمُ بيضُ/عطاياهُم مواعيد/ بخوزستانَ أقوامّ) The people of Khuzestan; Their gifts are promises; Their dinars are eggs (a pun on white); Their bodies are black)

Ya‘qūb was a scholar of Baghdād, which followed the Kūfī school tradition in grammar, Qur’anic science and poetry. He studied and recorded the pure Arabic language from the Desert Arabs. He tutored the sons of al-Mutawakkil, who were Al-Muntasir and Al-Mu'tazz.

Ya‘qūb’s surname was Abū Yūsuf and his son, Yūsuf, was a court companion and personally close to the caliph al-Mu‘taḍid.

He was a disciple of Abū ‘Amr al-Shaybānī, Muḥammad ibn Muhanna, and Muḥammad ibn Subh ibn as-Sammāq. He taught the philology of al-Asmaʿi, Abū Ubaidah, and al-Farrā’.

Isḥāq al-Nadīm records that he was a pupil of Naṣrān al-Khurāsāni. Naṣrān had transmitted the poetry of al-Kumayt with ‘Umar ibn Bukayr and Ibn al-Sikkīt, who had memorised Naṣrān's books (Note: Scholars who committed works to memory and taught without recourse to manuscripts, are mentioned in Kitāb al-Fihrist in several biographic accounts. References by early Islamic biographers to facility to memorize ('learn by heart') reflects the superiority of the oral above the textual in transmission of "authentic knowledge, that had roots in ancient tradition—Cf. Socrates and Plato, Porphyry and Plotinus, etc. See Ibn Asakir al-Hafiz; “The fairest branch [of the science of Traditions] is the well-authenticated statement…instruction conveyed by dictation… receive[d].. from the mouths of men. Take it not from books, or the faults of the copyists will overwhelm you.”) had a bitter disagreement about Naṣrān‘s teachings with the Kūfī scholar, al-Ṭūsī. (Note: Ṭūsī (al-), Abū al-Ḥasan ‘Ali ibn ‘Abd Allāh al-Ṭūsī was a pupil of Ibn al-A’rābī at al-Kūfah in the early 9th century. whose knowledge relied on recited material.)

The account of al-Sikkīt, related by al-Nadim through the classical isnād source-system, cites the narrator-chain of Abū Sa‘īd, Abū Bakr ibn Durayd (Note: Durayd (Ibn), Abū Bakr Muḥammad ibn al-Ḥasan (837–934) a famous scholar of al-Baṣrah.) and al-Riyāshī, (Note: Al-Riyāshī, Abū al-Faḍl al-‘Abbās ibn al-Faraj (d. 257 AH / 870- 71 AD), a grammarian of al-Baṣrah, disciple of al-Aṣma’ī and pupil of al-Māzinī, who studied the Book of Sībawayh.) in an account illustrative of the active intellectual exchange between the two rival schools of Baṣrah and Kūfah in the 9th century. A group of wārraqūn (Note: Warrāq, pl. al-warrāqūn; Manuscript copyist, or dealer in manuscripts and stationery. Typically warrāq-owned bookshops were places where scholars gathered.) of al-Kūfah gathered for a reading aloud by a warrāq of al-Baṣrah, of Ibn al-Sikkīt’s Book of Logic. Al-Riyāshī was at the event and attested that Ibn al-Sikkīt had told him, that he had learned the vernacular dialects of Southern ‘Irāq from Ḥarashat al-Ḍibāb and Aklat al-Yarābī, and they had derived theirs from the people of al-Sawād. He mentions examples of words such as “akalah al-kuwāmīkh” and “al-shawārīz." (Note: These words from the dialects of southern ‘Irāq cannot be identified.)

The tests of rivalry between schools is illustrated in another account given by al-Nadim, told as a kind of cautionary tale. When al-Athram, a young scholar from al-Baṣrah, challenges Ya‘qūb ibn al-Sikkīt, a senior scholar of al-Kūfah school, on a verse by the poet al-Rā’ī, he clearly breaks the etiquette code that always ranks seniority above juniority.

== Works ==
- Al-Alfāz (‘Pronunciations’, or ‘Dialects’); (كتاب الالفاظ)
- Iṣlāh al-Mantiq (‘Correction of Logic’); (كتاب اصلاح المنطق); abridged by Ibn al-Maghribī, and revised by the Yaḥyā ibn ʿAlī al-Tibrīzī Ibn as-Sīrāfi, produced an educative anthology from excerpted verses.
- Az-Zibrij (‘Ornamentation’); (كتاب الزبرج)
- Al-Bath (‘Investigation’ (كتاب البحث)
- Al-Amthāl (‘Book of Proverbs’); (كتاب الامثال)
- Al-Maqṣūr wa al-Mamdūd (‘The Shortened and the Lengthened’); (كتاب المقصور والممدود)
- Al-Muḍakkar wa al-Mu’annath (‘Masculine and Feminine’); (كتاب المذكر والمؤنث)
- Al-Ajnās Kabīr (‘The Great Book, Categories’); (كتاب الاجناس كبير)
- Al-Farq (‘Differentiation’); (كتاب الفرق)
- As-Sarj wa al-Lijām (‘Saddle and Bridle’); (كتاب السرج واللجام)
- Fa‘ala wa-Af‘ala; (كتاب فعل وافعل)
- Al-Ḥašarāt (‘Book of Insects’); (كتاب الحشرات)
- (‘Voices’);
- Al-Aḍdād (‘Contraries’); (كتاب الاضداد)
- An-Nabāt wa aš-Šajar (‘Trees and Plants’); (كتاب النبات والشجر)
- Al-Wuḥūš (‘Wild Beasts’); (كتاب الوحوش)
- Al-Ibil (‘The Camel’); (كتاب الابل)
- An-Nawādir (‘Rare Forms’); (كتاب النوادر)
- Ma‘ānī aš-Ši‘r al-Kabīr (‘Large Book, The Meaning of Poetry’); (كتاب معانى الشعر الكبير)
- Ma‘ānī aš-Ši‘r as-Ṣigar (‘Small book, The Meaning of Poetry’); (كتاب معانى الشعر الصغير)
- Saraqāt aš-Šu‘arā’ wa mā Ittafaqū ‘alaihi (‘Plagiarisms and Agreements of Poets’); (كتاب سرقات الشعراء وما اتفقوا عليه)
- Al-Qalb wa’l-Abdāl (‘Permutation and Substitution [in grammar]’; (كتاب القلب والابدال)
- Al-Maṭnān wa’l-Mabnan wa’l-Mukannan (‘The Dual, the Indeclinable, and the Surnamed’); (كتاب المثنى و المبنى والمكنى)
- Al-Ayyām wa’l-Layālī (‘Days and Nights’); (كتاب الايام والليالى)
- ’What Occurs in Poetry and What Is Deleted’;

=== List of Edited Poets (Note: Compare this list with al-Aṣma’ī, Fuḥālat al-Shu‘arā’.) ===
- Nābighah al-Dhubyānī: (Note: Several poets are called Nābighah. Ziyād ibn Mu‘āwiyah al-Nābighah al-Dhubyānī, a protégé of the princes of al-Ḥīrah and Ghassān. (ii) Al-Nābighah, ‘Abd Allāh ibn. Al-Mukhāriq. A man of the Banū Shaybān, patronized by the caliphs ‘Abd al-MaIik and al-Walīd (685–715).)(edited and abridged by Ibn as-Sikkīt), also edited by al-Sukkarī, al-Aṣma’ī' and al-Ṭūsī.
- Ḥuṭay’ah: (Note: Abū Mulaykah Jarwal ibn Aws Ḥuṭay’ah: Poet, convert to Islām in the caliphate of Mu’āwiya (661—680).) also edited by al-Aṣma’ī, Abū ‘Amr al-Shaybānī, al-Sukkarī, and al-Ṭūsī.
- Al-Nābighah al-Ja‘dī: (Note: Al-Ja‘dī, or al-Ju‘dī Poet and convert of early Islam.) also edited by al-Aṣma’ī, al-Sukkarī, and al-Ṭūsī.
- Labīd ibn Rabī‘ah al-‘Āmirī: (Note: Wrote fourth poem of the Mu‘alaqāt, became a Companion of the Prophet, d. after 661.) also edited by Abū ‘Amr al-Shaybānī, al-Aṣma’ī, al-Sukkarī, and al-Ṭūsī.
- Tamīm ibn Ubayy ibn Muqbil: (Note: Abū Ka‘b; Pre-Islamic poet, became a Muslim, lived to age of about a 100 years.) also edited by Abū ‘Amr [al-Shaybānī], al-Aṣma’ī, al-Sukkarī, and al-Ṭūsī.
- Muhalhil ibn Rabī‘ah: (Note: Pre-Islāmic poet, uncle of the great Imru’ al-Qays ibn Ḥujr ibn al-Ḥārith, possibly first to use the al-qaṣīdah (ode).) also edited by al-Sukkarī and al-Aṣma’ī.
- Al-A‘shā al-Kabīr, Maymūn ibn Qays, Abū Baṣīr: (Note: Poet, joined the Prophet late in life, died at al-Yamāmah.) (Note: Almost certainly Maymūn ibn Qays, called al-Kabīr (“the elder” or "the great”))
- Al-A’shā al-Kabīr: (Note: Most certainly Maymūn ibn Qays, called al-Kabīr (“the elder” or "the great”).) also edited by al-Sukkarī, Abū ‘Amr al-Shaybānī, al-Aṣma’ī, al-Ṭūsī, and Tha‘lab.
- A‘shā Bāhilah ‘Amir ibn al-Ḥārith: (Note: Poet, lived just before Islām.) also edited by al-Aṣma’ī and al-Sukkarī.
- Bishr ibn Abī Khāzim: (Note: Bishr ibn Ḥāzim in Beatty MS. Tribal poet, late C6th.) (Note: Beatty MS has Bishr ibn Ḥāzim.) also edited by al-Aṣma’ī and al-Sukkarī.
- Ḥumayd ibn Thawr al-Rājiz: (Note: Poet lived after the Prophet, before first caliph.) (Note: Flügel has “al-Rabbāḥī”, Beatty and Tonk MSS “al-Rājiz.”) also edited by al-Sukkarī, al-Aṣma’ī, Abū ‘Amr [al-Shaybānī] and al-Ṭūsī.
- Ḥumayd al-Arqaṭ: (Note: Poet who lived in caliphate of ‘Abd al-Malik (685–705).) also edited by al-Sukkarī, al-Aṣma’ī, Abū ‘Amr [al-Shaybānī] and al-Ṭūsī.
- Suhaym ibn Wathīl al-Riyāḥī: (Note: Early Islamic period poet. Beatty MS calls his father Wūthīl; Flügel adds “al-Āmilī” to his name.) also edited by al-Sukkarī and al-Aṣma’ī.
- Urwah ibn al-Ward: (Note: (or Ṣu‘lūk) Pre-Islamic poet famed for charity.) also edited by al-Sukkarī and al-Aṣma’ī.
- Al-‘Abbās ibn Mirdās al-Sulamī: also edited by al-Sukkarī and al-Ṭūsī.
- Al-Khansa: also edited by Ibn al-A‘rābī, al-Sukkarī, and others.
- Al-Kumayt ibn Ma‘rūf: (Note: Poet of a Bedouin family of poets, early period of Islam.) edited by al-Sukkarī and Al-Aṣma’ī, Ibn al-Sikkīt enlarged on it, and scholars quoted him from a chain of scholars through Ibn Kunāsah al-Asadī, Abū Jāzī, (Note: Beatty MS has Abū Hurrī, Flügel suggests Abū Jāzī is correct.) Abū al-Mawṣūl and Abū Ṣadaqah, the Banū Asad Tribe. Ibn al-Sikkīt received the poetry of al-Kumayt from Naṣrān his teacher who received it from Abū Ḥafṣ ‘Umar ibn Bukayr.

== See also ==
- List of Arab scientists and scholars
- Encyclopædia Britannica Online

== Bibliography ==
- Asākir (Ibn), ‘Ali ibn al-Hasan (1951). Tārikh madīnat Dimashq. Dimashq: Maṭbūʻāt al-Majmaʻ al-ʻIlmī al-ʻArabī.
- Aṣma’ī (al-), Abū Sa’īd ‘Abd al-Malik ibn Qurayb (1953). Fuḥūlat al-Shu'arā'. Cairo: Al-Mūnīrīyah Press.
- Baghdādī (al-), ‘Abd al-Qādir ibn ‘Umar (1882). Maiman, A. A. (ed.). Khizanāt al-Adab wa Lubb Lubāb Lisan al-'Arab. Vol. 4. Cairo: Dār al-‘Uṣūr li-al-Ṭab‘ wa-al-Nashr.
- Baghdādī (al-), ‘Abd al-Qādir ibn ‘Umar (1927). Maiman, A. A. (ed.). Index: Iqlīd al-Khizāna. Lahore: University of the Punjab.
- Hamawī (al-), Yaqut (1861). Meynard, C. Barbier de (ed.). Dictionnaire géographique, historique et littéraire de la Perse et des contrées adjacentes extrait du Mo'djem elBouldan de Yaqout et complété a l'aide de documents arabes et persans pour la plupart inédits. Paris: al'Imprimerie Impériale.
- Flügel, Gustav (1862). Die grammatischen Schulen der Araber (in German). Leipzig: Brockhaus.
- Iṣbahānī (al-), Abū al-Faraj ‘Alī ibn al-Ḥusayn (1900). Kitāb al-Aghāni, "Tables alphabétiques" (in Arabic). Leiden: Brill.
- Khallikān (Ibn), Aḥmad ibn Muḥammad (1843). Ibn Khallikān's Biographical Dictionary (translation of Wafayāt al-A'yān wa-Anbā" Ahnā' al-Zamān). Vol. 1. Translated by MacGuckin de Slane. London: W. H. Allen.
- Khallikān (Ibn), Aḥmad ibn Muḥammad (1868). Ibn Khallikān's Biographical Dictionary (translation of Wafayāt al-A'yān wa-Anbā" Ahnā' al-Zamān). Vol. 2. Translated by MacGuckin de Slane. London: W. H. Allen.
- Khallikān (Ibn), Aḥmad ibn Muḥammad (1871). Wafayāt al-A'yān wa-Anbā' Abnā' al-Zamān (The Obituaries of Eminent Men). Vol. IV. Translated by McGuckin de Slane, William. Paris: Oriental Translation Fund of Great Britain and Ireland. pp. 293–301.
- Nadīm (al-), Ishaq (1970). Dodge, Bayard (ed.). Fihrist of al-Nadīm, A Tenth-Century Survey of Muslim Culture. New York & London: Columbia University Press.
- Nadīm (al-), Abū al-Faraj Muḥammad ibn Isḥāq (1872). Flügel, Gustav (ed.). Kitāb al-Fihrist (in Arabic). Leipzig: F.C.W. Vogel. pp. 649–50 (71–72).
- Nawawī (al-), Abū Zakarīyā’ Yaḥyā (1847) [1842]. Wüstenfeld, F (ed.). Kitāb Tahdhīb al-Asmā' (The Biographical Dictionary of Illustrious Men). Göttingen: London Society for the Publication of Oriental Texts.
- Nicholson, Reynold Aleyne (1907). A Literary History of the Arabs. London: T. Fisher Unwin.
- Qutaybah (Ibn) (1949). Kitāb al-Ma'ānī al-Kabīr fī Abyāt al-Ma'ānī (in Arabic). Vol. 2. Hyderabad: Dā’irat al-Ma‘ārif al-‘Uthmānīyah.
- Ibn Qotaiba, ʻAbd Allāh ibn Muslim (Ibn Qutaybah) (1904). Goeje, M. J. de (ed.). Kitāb al-Shi'r wa-al-Shu'arā' (Liber Poësie et Poëtarum) (in Arabic). Leiden: Brill.
- Qutaybah (Ibn) (1930) [1925]. Kitab 'Uyūn al-Akhbār. Vol. 4. Cairo: Dar al-Kutub al-Miṣrīyah.
- Ṭabārī (al-), M. b. Jarīr (1890) [1879]. M. J. de Goejev (ed.). Ta'rīkh al-Rusul wa-al-Mulūk (Annales). Vol. 14. Leiden: Brill.
- Tammām (Abū), Ḥabīb ibn Aws (1846). Rückert, Friedrich (ed.). Al-Ḥamāsah (translation of Dīwān al-Ḥamāsah). Stuttgart: Liesching.
- Hamawī (al-), Yāqūt Shīhab ibn ‘Abd Allāh (1927) [1907]. "Irshād al-Arīb alā Ma'rifat al-Adīb (Yaqut's Dictionary of Learned Men). (D. S. Margoliouth, Ed.)". E. J. W. Gibb Memorial Series (VI). Leiden: Brill: 300.
- Ziriklī (al-), Khayr al-Dīn (1959) [1954]. Al-A'lām (in Arabic). Vol. 10 (2 ed.). Cairo.
- Zubaydī (al-), Muḥammad ibn al-Ḥasan (1954). Ibrāhīm, Muḥammad (ed.). Ṭabaqāt al-Naḥwīyīn wa-al-Lughawīyīn (in Arabic). Cairo: Muḥammad Sāmī Amīn al-Khānjī al-Kutubī.
