= Al-Farra' =

Daylamite scholar (761–822)

- الفراء
- Title: Amīr al-Muʾminīn fī al-Nahw (lit. ''The Commander of the Faithful in Grammar'')

Personal life
- Born: 144 AH / 761-762 CE Kufa, Iraq, Abbasid Caliphate
- Died: 207 AH / 822-823 CE (aged 60-62) Abbasid Caliphate
- Era: Abbasid Era
- Region: Iraq
- Main interests: Arabic grammar; Linguistics; Philology; Lexicography; exegesis
- Known for: Traditionally founder and head of the grammatical school of al-Kūfa
- Relatives: Muhammad al-Shaybani (Maternal cousin)

Religious life
- Religion: Islam

Muslim leader
- Teacher: Qays ibn al-Rabīʿ, Mandil ibn ʿAlī, Abū Bakr ibn ʿAyyāsh, al-Kisāʾī, and Sufyān ibn ʿUyayna, Yūnus ibn Ḥabīb al-Baṣrī
- Students: Salama ibn ʿĀṣim, Abu Ubaid al-Qasim, Muḥammad ibn Jahm al-Simmarī, Ibn al-Sikkīt
- Arabic name
- Personal (Ism): Yaḥyā يحيى
- Patronymic (Nasab): ibn Ziyād ibn ʿAbdullāh ibn Manṣūr ابن زياد ابن عبد الله ابن منصور
- Teknonymic (Kunya): Abū Zakarīyā’ أبو زكريا
- Toponymic (Nisba): al-Daylamī al-Farrā’ al-Asadī الديْلَمي الفَرّاء الأسدي

Al-Farrāʼ (الفراء), he was Abū Zakarīyāʼ Yaḥyā ibn Ziyād ibn ʽAbd Allāh ibn Manṣūr al-Daylamī al-Farrāʼ (أبو زكريا يحيى بن زياد بن عبد الله بن منصور الدَّيْلميّ الفراء), was a Daylamite scholar and the principal pupil of al-Kisā’ī (الكساءى). He is the most brilliant of the Kūfan scholars. Muḥammad ibn Al-Jahm quotes Ibn al-Quṭrub that it was al-Farrā’s melodic eloquence and knowledge of the pure spoken Arabic of the Bedouins and their expressions that won him special favour at the court of Hārūn al-Rashīd. He died on the way to Mecca, aged about sixty, or sixty-seven, in 822 (207 AH).

== Life ==
Abū Zakarīyah ibn Ziyād al-Farrā’ was born in al-Kūfah into a family of Iranian Daylamī origin. He was a mawla (client, or, apprentice) of the Banū Minqar (بنى مِنْقَر), although Salamah ibn ‘Āṣim said he was called al-‘Absī (العبسى), i.e. of the Banū Abs. Abū ‘Abd Allāh ibn Muqlah (ابى عبد الله ابن مقلة) claimed Al-Yūsufī (Note: Abū al-Ṭayyib Muḥammad ibn ‘Abd Allāh al-Yūsufī (اليوسفى يحيى بن زياد بن قوابخت) (fl. late C9th), scholar.) called him Yaḥyā ibn Ziyād ibn Qāwī-Bakht (Note: These Persian names are likely loose Arab transliterations. Cf Suyūṭī, Bughyat, p. 411.) ibn Dāwar ibn Kūdanār. The main details of his life come from Tha‘lab (ابوالعباس ثعلب) who quotes Aḥmad ibn Yaḥyā saying: “If the expression spoils the meaning it is not the words of the Bedouin Arabs, or ‘pure’. But al-Farrā’ says it correctly because he based Arabic and grammar on the spoken language of the Arabs. He (al-Farrā) said: When the expression agrees with its meaning, the expression is correct. Sībawayh errs because his etymological work is not founded in the expressions of the 'Desert Arabs' (Bedouin) and is without knowledge of their oral language and their poems, but instead relies on the poems of the urban Arabs and the pharaohs and applies the expression to the meaning.” Al-Farrā’ was said to be called Farrā’ because he was 'free to speak'.

He knew the grammarians of al-Kūfah after the time of al-Kisā’ī's, whom he adopted. The Kūfans claimed that he borrowed much from Yūnus ibn Habīb (Note: Yūnus ibn Ḥabīb, Abū 'Abd al-Raḥmān (708-798) a great philologist of the Grammarians of Basra) but this was denied by the Baṣrans. He loved to speak and yet was retiring and pious. He was a zealous adherent of Sībawayh, writing under his leadership. In his Al-Hudud he used philosophical terminology.

Tha'lab relates that al-Farrā’s was a friend of ‘Umar ibn Bukayr (عمر بن بكير), the preceptor to the vizier of the caliph Al-Ma'mūn, who was called Āmir al-Ḥasan ibn Sahl (الحسن بن سهل). Al-Farrā taught in the mosque next to his house. Umar approached him for exegetic advice on teaching Qur'ānic studies to the vizier, and so al-Farrā' dictated the book Ma‘ānī aI-Qur’ān for his students to copy out. (Note: Instruction in a mosque was customary in medieval times.) At the request of the caliph al-Ma'mun he dictated his Kitāb al-Ḥudūd (كتاب الحدود), 'Classifications' (in poetry and grammar), as a project to instruct the students of al-Kisā’ī. Over the sixteen year period it took to complete, a muezzin reader read while al-Farrā’ explained the entire Qur’ān. He continued dictating long after most students had lost interest and only two remained. Instruction without recourse to a text book was a good proof of memory and the mark of a great scholar. Tha'lab makes a point of saying that al-Farrā’ was only once seen with a book and that was his dictation from a manuscript of the chapter ‘Mulāzim’. (Note: ‘Mulāzim’; probably chapter six of Kitāb Al-Ḥudūd.) A neighbour of Al-Farrā’s, named al- Wāqidī (الواقدى), remarked on al-Farrā’ particular use of philosophical terms in his literary dictations. Al-Farrā’ lived most of his life at Baghdād and was very frugal, and even hunger did not concern him. He spent forty days annually at al-Kūfah, his native town, and distributed most of his considerable earnings from teaching among his people.

His father Ziad had his hand cut off in the war with Abī Tharwan and Abū Tharwan the mawla of the Banū Abs. Ibn al-Nadīm lists Al-Farrā's associates as Ibn Qādim (Note: Abū Ja‘far Muḥammad ibn Qādim tutored Al-Mu'tazz as a boy, who disliked him for his disciplinarian teaching style, so when Al-Mu'tazz became caliph in 866 (251 AH) Abū Ja‘far fled into exile. Ibn Qādim had a good grasp of ‘ilal, (causes, or defects). He wrote books titled ‘Sufficiency' about grammar, ‘The Strange in the Ḥadīth’ and ‘Abridgment of Grammar.’) and Salamah ibn Āṣim, who was with him in his final illness, when his mind had gone. Those who quoted him listed by Suyūṭī were; Qais ibn al-Rabī, Mandal ibn ‘Alī al-Kisā’ī, Salamah ibn Āṣim and Muḥammad ibn Jahm al-Samari, who transmitted his books.

Salamah ibn Āṣim said it was al-Ṭuwāl (الطوال) who preserved his only extant poetry in some verses quoted by Abū Ḥanīfah al-Dīnawarī (ابو حنيفة الدونورى):

Oh, governor over a jarīb of land (Note: jarīb, an area equal to 144sq. yards.), with nine doorkeepers, (Note: ḥājib (pl., ḥujjāb), either ‘doorkeepers’ or ‘chamberlain.’ Cf. the free translation in Khallikān, IV, 67.)

Seated in the midst of a ruin, in which he is served by a doorkeeper,

Never before have we heard of the doorkeeper of a ruin;

Eyes shall not disclose me to you at a door,

For one like me does not endure the repulse of doorkeepers.

— Nadīm (al-), 1970

== Works ==
Al-Suyuti recorded eleven works by him, Ibn al-Nadim listed thirteen, while Ibn Khallikan and Yaqut al-Hamawi each attributed seventeen works to him. Some of the listed titles may actually be referring to individual chapters of his larger work, al-Ḥudūd. In total, his writings are said to have amounted to three thousand sheets. Several of his works are now lost, while other survive only in manuscript form.

- Ālat al-Kitāb – The Key of [Understanding Sībawayh's] Kitāb.

Lost Work

- al-Ayyām wa al-Layālī wa-l-shuhūr – The Days, Nights and the Months.

Printed.

- al-Jamʿ wa al-Tathniyah fī al-Qurʾān – Plural and Dual [Forms] in the Qurʾān.

Lost Work

- Kitab al-Ḥudūd – The Book of [Grammatical] Definitions.

It was commissioned by Al-Ma'mun and compiled with the help from the caliph's secretaries around 204 / 819. Al-Ma’mun ordered the work to be kept in his treasury. According to Ibn al-Nadim, it contained 45 chapters; Al-Suyuti counted 46, while Al-Zubaydī recorded 60. A table of contents is cited in Ibn al-Nadīm's Fihrist and a slightly different version is cited by Al-Qifṭī. Lost Work

- Ḥurūf al-Muʿjam – The Letters of the Alphabet.

Lost Work. Cited by Ibn Rashīq.

- al-Fākhir fī al-Amthāl – The Distinguished [Book] of Proverbs.

A manuscript is located in the Fātiḥ Library, Istanbul, (MS no. 4009). Not printed yet

- Faʿala wa Afʿala – [On the Verb Patterns] Faʿala and Afʿala.

Possibly a chapter in al-Ḥudūd. It was cited by Al-Suyuti in al-Muẓhir. Lost Work

- al-Lughāt al-Qurʾān – The Dialects of the Qurʾān.

A partial manuscript survives in Vahid Pasha Manuscript Library (MS no. 721917). It is published in digital library Al-Maktaba al-Shamela. Not printed yet.

- al-Mudhakkar wa al-Muʾannath – Masculine and Feminine [Forms].

Printed

- al-Mushkil al-Ṣaghīr – The Minor Book of Ambiguities.

The work addressed ambiguous Qurʾānic expressions. Lost Work

- al-Mushkil al-Kabīr – The Major Book of Ambiguities.

The work addressed ambiguous Qurʾānic expressions. Lost Work

- al-Maṣādir fī al-Qurʾān – The Verbal Nouns in the Qurʾān.

Lost Work

- Maʿānī al-Qurʾān – Meanings of the Qurʾān.

His most important work. He started it on the suggestion of his friend ʿUmar bin Bukayra and completed it in three years (202–204 / 817–819) dectating it entirely from memory. A refutation of this work was written by Ibn Durustawayh and an abridgement was produced by al-Dīnawārī. Printed multiple times.

- al-Maqṣūr wa al-Mamdūd – The Shortened and Lengthened [Forms].

Also called al-Manqūṣ wa-l-mamdūd. Printed

- Kitab al-Nawādir – The Book of Linguistic Rarities.

Lost Work

- al-Waqf wa al-Ibtidāʾ – The Pause and Resumption [in Qurʾānic Recitation].

Lost Work

- Kitab al-Mulazim – The Book of Necessary Linguistic Constructions

Possibly a chapter heading of al-Ḥudūd

- Kitāb al-Wāw – The Book on [the Letter] Wāw

Lost Work

- Kitāb Yāfiʿ wa-Yafaʿa – The Book on [the Words] Yāfiʿ and Yafaʿa

Yaqut al-Hamawi recorded it as Kitāb Yāfiʿwa-Yāfiʿa, which comprised 50 folios together with Kitab al-Mulazim.

- Kitāb al-Bahāʾ fī mā talḥanu fīhi al-ʿāmma – The Book of Elegance Concerning the Mistakes Made by the Common People

It was written for Abdallah ibn Tahir. Lost Work

- Kitāb Ikhtilāf Ahl al-Kūfa wa al-Baṣra wa Ahl al-Shām fī al-Maṣāḥif – The Book on the Differences between the People of Kūfa, Baṣra, and al-Shām in the Muṣḥafs

Lost Work

- Mushkil al-Lughah – Difficulties of the Language

Lost Work

== See also ==
- List of Iranian scientists and scholars

== Bibliography ==
- Baghdādī (al-), al-Khaṭīb Abū Bakr Aḥmad ibn ‘Alī (1931). Ta'rīkh Baghdād. Cairo: Al-Sa’ādah Press.
- Blachère, R. (2012). "al-Farrāʾ". Encyclopaedia of Islam, Second Edition. Brill Online. doi:10.1163/1573-3912_islam_SIM_2293.
- Flügel, Gustav Leberecht (1872). J. Roediger; A. Mueller (eds.). Al-Fihrist (in Arabic). Leipzig: F.C.W. Vogel.
- Khallikān (Ibn), Aḥmad ibn Muḥammad (1871). Ibn Khallikān's Biographical Dictionary (translation of Wafayāt al-A'yān wa-Anbā'). Vol. IV. Translated by MacGuckin de Slane. London: Oriental Translation Fund of Britain and Ireland. pp. 63–70.
- Nadīm (al-), Abū al-Faraj Muḥammad ibn Isḥāq Abū Ya’qūb al-Warrāq (1970). Dodge, Bayard (ed.). The Fihrist of al-Nadim; a tenth-century survey of Muslim culture. New York & London: Columbia University Press. ISBN 978-0-231-02925-4.
- Suyūṭī, Jalāl al-Dīn ‘Abd Al-Raḥmān (1909). Khānjī, Muḥammad Amīn (ed.). Bughyat al-Wu'āt fī Ṭabaqāt al-Lughawīyīn wa-al-Nuḥāh (in Arabic). Vol. 2. Cairo: Sa’ādah Press. p. 333.
- Zubaydī (al-), Abū Bakr Muḥammad ibn al-Ḥasan (1984). "§60". In Ibrāhīm, Muḥammad (ed.). Ṭabaqāt al-Naḥwīyīn wa-al-Lughawīyīn (in Arabic) (2 ed.). Cairo: Dar al-Ma'arif. pp. 131–3.
