= Abu al-Hasan al-Ahmar =

Arab philologist and grammarian

- أبوالحسن الأحمر
- Born: 8th-century Basra
- Died: c. 810; Baghdad

Academic work
- Era: Abbasid, Islamic Golden Age
- Main interests: philology, Grammar, lexicography
- Notable works: Kitab al-Tafsir (كتاب التفسير); ‘Book of Interpretations’

'Abū al-Ḥasan Alī ibn al-Mubārak(or al-Ḥasan) al-Aḥmar (Arabic: أبو الحسن علي بن المبارك الأحمر) (d. 194 AH) (d. 810 AD) known for short as Abu al-Hasan al-Ahmar or al-Ahmar al-Nahawi (الأحمر النحوي; lit. 'al-Ahmar the Grammarian'), was a renowned Arab philologist and grammarian of the Kufan school. Described as 'The Sheikh of Arabic' by the historian al-Safadi. His knowledge of lexicographical matters are mentioned by many quotations in al-Gharib al-Musannaf (الغريب المصنف; lit. 'The Peculiar in Chapters') of his contemporary Abu Ubayd al-Qasim ibn Salam (770–838).

== Biography ==
Abu al-Hasan was probably born in Basra at an unknown date. At a young age, he left for the Abbasid capital, Baghdad. There, he worked as one of the palace guards of the famous Abbasid caliph, Harun al-Rashid (r. 786–809) While working, he met the grammarian al-Kisai (d. 805), who at the time was the court tutor of Harun's sons, al-Amin and al-Ma'mun. Abu al-Hasan would therefore become a faithful disciple of al-Kisai, and he showed great interest in grammar and philology. He is also known to have been part of the munāẓara (lit. 'Debate') that was held between his master al-Kisai and the prominent grammarian of the time, Sibawayh (d. 796). Abu al-Hasan himself took part in tutoring al-Amin by the appointment of the court tutor, his teacher al-Kisai for a brief period of time.

== Works ==
- Kitab al-Tafsir (كتاب التفسير; Book of Interpretation)
- Yaqin al-Bulagha' (يقين البلغاء; The Certainty of Eloquent Men)
- al-Tasrif (التصريف; Morphology)

== See also ==
- List of pre-modern Arab scientists and scholars
