= Grammarians of Kufa =

Arabic Grammarians of Kufa city under Caliphate period

The Kufan School of Arabic Grammar, also the Grammarians of Kufa, was a school of thought that dominated amongst grammarians in Kufa during the Islamic Golden Age.

Al-Kūfah began as a military base ca. 638 near Ḥīrah on the western branch of the Euphrates river and grew, as had its counterpart at Al-Basrah also grown, from an encampment into a town that attracted the great intellectual elites from across the region. The first grammarian of al-Kūfah was Al-Ru'asi who lived in the eighth century, whereas the earliest scholars of the School at Baṣrah, lived during the seventh century. The great intellectual project that developed out of both schools of philology, created the sciences of Arabic grammar and lexicography. What emerged from an impetus to interpret the sacred texts of the Qu’rān and Ḥadīth, by humanists of al-Baṣrah and al-Kūfah, led to a communal quest for the purest, least corrupt, Arabic source material, for which they turned to the Pre-Islamic oral poetry as recited by the rāwī. The compositions of famous poets were collected, arranged, and committed to writing. The grammarians of al-Baṣrah and al-Kūfah collected the ancient Arabian poetry and arranged the material into “Dīwān” (pl. Dawāwan) according to certain principles; either by classes of individuals, tribal groupings, selected qaṣīdas, or by themes of fragments, and edited into anthologies. Examples of their works are the Mu’allaqāt, and the Mufaḍḍaliyāt by al-Mufaḍḍal al-Ḍabbī.

== Philologists of al-Kūfah found in al-Fihrist of Isḥāq al-Nadīm ==
- Anbārī (al-), Abū Muhammad Qāsim - Abū Muḥammad ibn Muḥammad ibn Bashshār al-Anbārī’ al-Qāsim, was a pupil of al-Farrā’ and Tha‘lab. His son was Abū Bakr Ibn al-Anbārī, (885 - 940), a scholar famed for his memory. (Note: Authorities differ on these dates.)
- A’rābī (Ibn al-) - Abū ‘Abd Allāh Muḥammad ibn Ziyād (ca. 760 – 846). Celebrated linguist of rare phraseology. He died at Sāmarrā.
- ‘Arūḍī (al-) - Abū Muḥammad. a.k.a., Barzakh, or Nazraḥ, (fl. ca. 800), acclaimed author of book on prosody (arud). The scholar of al-Baṣrah, Ibn Durustūyah, wrote a refutation of his book.
- ‘Aṣīdah (Abū) - Aḥmad ibn ‘Ubayd (Allāh) ibn Nāṣiḥ, Abū Ja’far (d. 886/887), of al-Kūfah, tutor to the sons of Caliph Al-Mutawakkil (r. 847-861).
- ‘Āṣim (ibn), Salamah - Abū Muḥammad; a grammarian and associate of al-Farrā’ at al-Kūfah in the early C 9th. His son was the scholar al-Mufaḍḍal ibn Salamah.
- Farrā’ (al-) - Abū Zakarīyā’ Yaḥyā ibn Ziyād (d. 822), from Daylam, (Iran) was an important scholar of al-Kisā’ī, who died aged sixty.
- Ḥā’ik (al-), Hārūn ibn – a.k.a. Hārūn of al-Ḥīrah, a converted Jew from al-Ḥīrah and a disciple of Tha‘lab, a linguist and grammarian of latter C 9th. (Note: Name spelled incorrectly in Flügel edition of al-Fihrist).
- Ḥazunbal (al-) - Abū ‘Abd Allāh Muḥammad ibn ‘Abd Allāh ibn ‘Āṣim al-Tamīmī, C9th scholar and source for material on Abū ‘Amr al-Shaybānī.
- Hishām ibn Mu‘āwīyah al-Ḍarīr (died 824), a blind grammarian and qāri’ (reciter of the Qur’ān) at al-Kūfah.
- Karnabā’ī (al-) - Hishām ibn Ibrāhīm, Abū ‘Alī, from Karnaba near al-Ahwaz an early C. 9th grammarian at al-Kūfah and a pupil of al-Aṣma’ī. *Khaṭṭabī (al-) - Abū Muḥammad ‘Abd Allāh ibn Muḥammad ibn Harb (d. ca. 893 – 896), language student of al-Kūfah, who died at Damascus.
- Khurāsānī (al-), Naṣrān, a teacher of Ibn al-Sikkīt first half C. 9th.
- Kisā’ī (al-) - Abū al-Ḥasan ‘Alī ibn Hamzah of al-Kūfah. Al-Kisā’ī a celebrated grammarian who tutored the sons of the Abbāsid caliph Hārūn al-Rashīd and was an authorized Quranic reader. (d. ca.795/813).
- Kunāsah (Ibn) - Abū Muḥammad ‘Abd Allāh ibn Yaḥyā, a.k.a., ‘Abd al-A‘lā ibn Muḥammad, (fl. ca. 741 - 823); an authority on tribal poetry, he was of the tribe of Asad. Born at al-Kūfah and later moved to Baghdād.
- Mardān (Ibn) - Abū Mūsa ‘Īsā al-Kūfī, C 9th grammarian at al-Kūfah.
- Marzabān (ibn),‘Alī ibn ‘Abd al-‘Azīz - Abū al-Ḥasan (d. ca. 900) lived at Makkah, a Qur’ān reader.
- Mu’ādh al-Harrā’ - Mu’ādh ibn Muslim al-Harrā’, aka ‘’Abū Muslim’’’’ and ‘’Abū ‘Alī’’’’, (ca.722 – 803), was a cloth dealer of Harāt, and a poet.
- Mufaḍḍal (al-) al-Ḍabbī - Ibn Salamah al-Ḍabbī, Abū Ṭālib (d. 903), author of the famous al-Mufaḍḍaliyāt and a renowned scholar of Qur’an and literature from al-Kūfah.
- Naṣr ibn Yūsuf - an 8th-century grammarian and philologist of the school of al-Kūfah.
- Qādim (Ibn) (Note: The Beatty MS has Ibn Qādim, whereas Flügel gives Abū Qādim.) - Abū Ja‘far Muḥammad (Aḥmad). A scholar of al-Kūfah, he taught Tha‘lab in Baghdād and tutored Al-Mu'tazz, the son of the caliph, before 866.
- Qāsim (al-) ibn Ma‘n ibn ‘Abd al-Raḥmān; scholar and Qāḍī (judge) of al-Kūfah (d. 791/792)
- Ru’āsī (al-) - Abū Ja‘far Muḥammad ibn al-Ḥasan ibn Abī Sārah al-Nīlī al-Ru’āsī, wrote the first grammar book in the Abbasid caliphate of Harūn ar-Rashīd (786-809).
- Sa‘dān (Ibn) - Abū Ja‘far Muḥammad ibn Sa‘dān al-Ḍarīr (fl. 778 – 846) a language student and reader of the Qur’ān who lived at Baghdād.
- Sarkhasī (al-) - Abū Ṭalib ‘Abd al-‘Azīz ibn Muḥammad from Sarkhas, Khurāsān, with links to al-Kūfah who taught in the mosque of the Tarjumānīyah (Note: Mosque of the Tarjumānīyah was probably a quarter of West Baghdād. (Dodge, B., “Biographical Index”, p. 1094) in the late C 8th - early C 9th.)
- Ṣa’ūdā’ - Abū Sa’īd Muḥammad ibn Hubayrah al-Asadī (fl. late C. 9th) of al-Kūfah, grammarian and philologist attached to a son of the Caliph al-Mu‘tazz at Baghdād. Yāqūt calls him Sa‘ūrā’.
- Shāmī (al-), Abū Muhammad ‘Abd Allāh (‘the Syrian’) - Muḥammad (Abū) ‘Abd Allāh ibn Muḥammad al-Shāmī, a Syrian pupil of Tha‘lab, in the latter C. 9th.
- Shaybānī (al-) - Abū ‘Amr Isḥāq ibn Mirār (d. ca. 821- 828), lived a long life and categorized the poetry and lore of at least 80 tribes. His son, ‘Amr ibn Abī ‘Amr (d. 845/846), collected and publicised his works.
- Sikkīt (al-), the father of Ya’qūb Ibn al-Sikkīt, was a scholar of literature who had studied under al-Farrā’. He was from Dawraq near al-Ahwaz. The son, Abū Yūsuf Ya‘qūb ibn Isḥāq Ibn al-Sikkīt, was a tutor to the son of Al-Mutawakkil and a celebrated grammarian. (d. 857 – 861).
- Thābit ibn Abī Thābit - ‘Abd al-‘Azīz, Abū Muḥammad (probably in early C. 9th) from al-Kūfah, a scholar of tribal dialects.
- Thābit ibn ‘Amr ibn Ḥabīb and ‘Alī ibn Muḥammad ibn Wahb al-Mash’arī were early C9th disciples of Abū ‘Ubayd al-Qāsim.
- Tha‘lab - Abū al-‘Abbās Aḥmad ibn Yaḥyā (ca. 815 – 904), of Baghdād, a celebrated grammarian and traditionist, who moved from al-Kūfah to Baghdād.
- Ṭūsī (al-) - Abū al-Ḥasan ‘Alī ibn ‘Abd Allāh Ibn Sinān at-Taimi of the Banu Taym, native of Ṭūs, early C9th pupil of Ibn al-A’rābī at al-Kūfah. A narrator of poetry and oral history of the Arab tribes. He compiled the diwan of Ibn al-Tathriya.
- Ṭuwāl (al-) - Abū ‘Abd Allāh Muḥammad ibn Aḥmad ibn ‘Abd Allāh (d.857/858); grammarian of al-Kūfah. (Note: Spelled Ṭuwāl, or Ṭuwwāl.)
- ‘Ubayd (Abū) al-Qāsim ibn Sallām (770 – ca. 838) - the son of a Greek slave born at Herat, studied with al-Aṣma’ī and al-Kisā’ī, and became a judge.
- Zāhid (al-) - Abū ‘Umar Muḥammad ibn ‘Abd al-Wāḥid al-Mutarriz (ca. 870 – 957), an ascetic philologer of Baghdād.

== Sources ==
- Flügel, Gustav (1862). Die grammatischen Schulen der Araber (in Arabic). Leipzig: Brockhaus. p. 128.
- Iṣbahānī (al-), Abū al-Faraj ‘Alī ibn al-Ḥusayn (1868). Kitāb al-Aghāni (in Arabic). Vol. 20. Cairo: Būlāq Press.
- Khallikān (Ibn), Aḥmad ibn Muḥammad (1843). Ibn Khallikān's Biographical Dictionary (translation of Wafayāt al-A'yān wa-Anbā" Ahnā' al-Zamān). Vol. I–II. Translated by Mac Guckin de Slane. Paris & London: W. H. Allen.
- Khallikān (Ibn), Aḥmad ibn Muḥammad (1868). Ibn Khallikān's Biographical Dictionary (translation of Wafayāt al-A'yān wa-Anbā" Ahnā' al-Zamān). Vol. III. Translated by Mac Guckin de Slane. Paris & London: W. H. Allen.
- Khallikān (Ibn), Aḥmad ibn Muḥammad (1871). Ibn Khallikān's Biographical Dictionary (translation of Wafayāt al-A'yān wa-Anbā" Ahnā' al-Zamān). Vol. IV. Translated by Mac Guckin de Slane. Paris: Oriental Translation Fund of Great Britain and Ireland.
- Mas‘ūdī (al-), Abū al-Ḥasan ‘Alī ibn al-Ḥusayn (1877) [1871]. Kitāb Murūj al-Dhahab wa-Ma'ādin al-Jawhar/Les Prairies d'or (in Arabic and French). Vol. 9. Translated by Meynard, C. Barbier de; Courteille, Pavet de. Paris: Imprimerie nationale.
- Nadīm (al-), Ibn Isḥāq (1970). Dodge, B. (ed.). The Fihrist of al-Nadīm A Tenth-Century Survey of Muslim Culture. New York & London: Columbia University Press.
- Nicholson, Reynold A. (1907). A Literary History of the Arabs. London: T. Fisher Unwin.
- Suyūṭī (al-), Jalāl al-Dīn ‘Abd al-Raḥmān (1909). Bughyat al-Wu'āt fī Ṭabaqāt al-Lughawīyīn wa-al-Nuḥāh. Cairo: Sa‘adah Press. p. 404.
- Suyūṭī (al-), Jalāl al-Dīn ‘Abd al-Raḥmān (1964). Ibrāhīm, Muḥammad Abū l-Faḍl (ed.). Bughyat al-Wu'āt fī Ṭabaqāt al-Lughawīyīn wa-al-Nuḥāh (in Arabic). Vol. II. Cairo: Sa‘adah Press.
- Yāqūt, Shihāb al-Dīn ibn ‘Abd Allāh al-Ḥamawī (1927) [1907]. Margoliouth, D. S. (ed.). "Irshād al-Arīb alā Ma'rifat al-Adīb (Yaqut's Dictionary of Learned Men; 7 vols.)". E. J. W. Gibb Memorial Series (in Arabic). VI. Leiden: Brill.
- Yāqūt, Shihāb al-Dīn ibn ‘Abd Allāh al-Ḥamawī (1970) [1966]. Wüstenfeld, F. (ed.). Mu'jam al-Buldān (Jacut's Geographisches Wörterbuch). Vol. 6. Leipzig: Brockhaus.
- Yāqūt, Shihāb al-Dīn ibn ‘Abd Allāh al-Ḥamawī (1965). Wüstenfeld, F. (ed.). Mu'jam al-Buldān (Jacut's Geographisches Wörterbuch). Vol. 6 (Photo- graphic reproduction ed.). Teheran: Maktabat al-Asadī.
- Zubaydī (al-), Abū Bakr Muḥammad ibn al-Ḥasan (1984) [1954]. Ibrāhīm, Muḥammad (ed.). Ṭabaqāt al-Naḥwīyīn wa-al-Lughawīyīn (in Arabic). Cairo: Al-Khanjī.
