= Abu Hanifa Dinawari =

Persian Islamic polymath (died 895)

Personal life
- Born: Early 9th-century Dinawar, Jibal, Abbasid Caliphate
- Died: 895 Dinawar, Jibal, Abbasid Caliphate
- Era: Islamic Golden Age
- Main interest(s): botanist, historian, geographer, metallurgy, astronomer and mathematician
- Occupation: Muslim scholar

Religious life
- Religion: Islam

Abū Ḥanīfa Aḥmad ibn Dāwūd Dīnawarī (Arabic: أبو حنيفة أحمد بن داود الدينوري; died 895) was an Islamic Golden Age polymath: astronomer, agriculturist, botanist, metallurgist, geographer, mathematician, and historian.

== Life ==
Of Persian stock, Dinawari was born in the (now ruined) town of Dinawar in modern-day western Iran. It had some importance due to its geographical location, serving as the entrance to the region of Jibal as well as a crossroad between the culture of Iran and that of the inhabitants on the other side of the Zagros Mountains. The birth date of Dinawari is uncertain; it is likely that he was born during the first or second decade of the 9th century. He was instructed in the two main traditions of the Abbasid-era grammarians of al-Baṣrah and of al-Kūfah. His principal teachers were Ibn al-Sikkīt and his own father. (Note: Flügel translates the al-Fihrist as “son" but the Beatty MS has “father”.) He studied grammar, philology, geometry, arithmetic, and astronomy and was known to be a reliable traditionalist. His most renowned contribution is the Book of Plants, for which he is considered the founder of Arabic botany.

Dinawari's Kitāb al-akhbār al-ṭiwāl (General History), written from a Persian point of view, is possibly the earliest apparent effort to combine Iranian and Islamic history. While historians such as al-Tabari and Bal'ami devoted the introduction of their work to long discourses on the duration of the world, Dinawari attempted to establish the importance of Iranshahr ("land of Iran") as the centre of the world. In his work, Dinawari notably devoted much less space to the Islamic prophet Muhammad compared to that of Iran. Regardless, Dinawari was a devoted Muslim, as indicated by his commentary on the Qur'an. He concluded the history with the suppression of Babak Khorramdin's rebellion in 837, and the subsequent execution of the Iranian general Khaydhar ibn Kawus al-Afshin.

Besides having access to early Arabic sources, Dinawari also made use of Persian sources, including pre-Islamic epic romances. Fully acquainted with the Persian language, Dinawari occasionally inserted phrases from the language into his work.

Dinawari's spiritual successor was Hamza al-Isfahani (died after 961).

== Works ==
The tenth century biographical encyclopaedia, al-Fihrist written by Al-Nadim, lists sixteen book titles by Dinawari:

=== Mathematics and natural sciences ===
1. Kitâb al-kusuf ("Book of Solar Eclipses") (Note: Omitted in al-Fihrist)
2. Kitāb an-nabāt yufadiluh al-‘ulamā' fī ta’līfih (كتاب النبات يفضله العلماء في تأليفه), ‘Plants, valued by scholars for its composition'
3. Kitāb Al-Anwā (كتاب الانواء) 'Tempest' (weather)
4. Kitāb Al-qiblah wa'z-zawāl (Note: Al-qiblah the direction faced in prayer; here perhaps with astronomical meaning. Al-zawāl "sunset", perhaps also the sun’s absence. See “Kibla,” Enc. Islam, II, 985–89.) (كتاب القبلة والزوال) "Book of Astral Orientations"
5. Kitāb ḥisāb ad-dūr (كتاب حساب الدور), "Arithmetic/Calculation of Cycles"
6. Kitāb ar-rud ‘alā raṣd al-Iṣbhānī (كتاب الردّ على رصدٌ الاصفهانى) Refutation of Lughdah al-Iṣbhānī (Note: Flügel after Yāqūt, Irshād, VI (1), 127 n.2, has raṣd, “observation" (Astronomical), but in the Beatty MS “Lughdah” is probably correct. Abū ‘Alī al-Ḥasan al-Iṣbahānī was called "Lughdah".)
7. Kitāb al-baḥth fī ḥusā al-Hind (كتاب البحث في حسا الهند), "Analysis of Indian Arithmetic"
8. Kitāb al-jam’ wa'l-tafrīq (كتاب الجمع والتفريق); "Book of Arithmetic/Summation and Differentiation"
9. Kitāb al-jabr wa-l-muqabila (كتاب الجبر والمقابلة), "Algebra and Equation"
10. Kitāb nuwādr al-jabr (كتاب نوادرالجبر), "Rare Forms of Algebra"

=== Social sciences and humanities ===
1. Ansâb al-Akrâd ("Ancestry of the Kurds"). (Note: Omitted in al-Fihrist)
2. Kitāb Kabīr (كتاب كبير) "Great Book" [in history of sciences]
3. Kitāb al-faṣāha (كتاب الفصاحة), "Book of Rhetoric"
4. Kitāb al-buldān (كتاب البلدان), "Book of Cities (Regions) (Geography)"
5. Kitāb ash-sh’ir wa-shu’arā’ (كتاب الشعر والشعراء), "Poetry and the Poets"
6. Kitāb al-Waṣāyā (كتاب الوصايا), Commandments (wills);
7. Kitāb ma yulahan fīh al’āmma (كتاب ما يلحن فيه العامّة), How the Populace Errs in Speaking;
8. Islâh al-mantiq ("Improvement of Speech") (Note: Omitted in al-Fihrist)
9. Kitāb al-akhbār al-ṭiwāl (كتاب الاخبار الطوال), "General History" (Note: Dodge has "Legends in the Ṭiwāl Meter". Title omitted in Beatty MS. Ṭiwāl i.e. “long”.)

== Editions & translations ==
Dinawari's General History (Al-Akhbar al-Tiwal) has been edited and published numerous times (Vladimir Guirgass, 1888; Muhammad Sa'id Rafi'i, 1911; Ignace Krachkovsky, 1912; 'Abd al-Munim 'Amir & Jamal al-din Shayyal, 1960; Isam Muhammad al-Hajj 'Ali, 2001), but has not been translated in its entirety into a European language. Jackson Bonner has recently prepared an English translation of the pre-Islamic passages of al-Akhbar al-Tiwal.

== Book of Plants ==
Al-Dinawari is considered the founder of Arabic botany for his Kitab al-Nabat (Book of Plants), which consisted of six volumes. Only the third and fifth volumes have survived, though the sixth volume has partly been reconstructed based on citations from later works. In the surviving portions of his works, 637 plants are described from the letters sin to ya. He describes the phases of plant growth and the production of flowers and fruit.

The first part of the Book of Plants describes astronomical and meteorological concepts as they relate to plants, including the planets and constellations, the sun and moon, the lunar phases indicating seasons and rain, anwa, and atmospheric phenomena such as winds, thunder, lightning, snow, and floods. The book also describes different types of ground, indicating which types are more convenient for plants and the qualities and properties of good ground.

Al-Dinawari quoted from other early Muslim botanical works that are now lost, such as those of al-Shaybani, Ibn al-Arabi, al-Bahili, and Ibn as-Sikkit.

== See also ==
- List of Persian scientists and scholars
- Muslim Agricultural Revolution

== Bibliography ==
- Cahen, Claude (2006). Young, M.J.L.; Latham, J.D.; Serjeant, R.B. (eds.). Religion, learning, and science in the ʻAbbasid period (1. publ. ed.). Cambridge: Cambridge University Press. p. 198. ISBN 978-0521028875. "Abu Hanlfah al-DInawarl was a Persian of liberal outlook, who took an interest in botany among other sciences."
- Davaran, Fereshteh (2010). Continuity in Iranian Identity: Resilience of a Cultural Heritage. Routledge. ISBN 978-1138780149.
- Nicholson, Oliver (2018). The Oxford Dictionary of Late Antiquity. Oxford University Press.
- Herzig, Edmund; Stewart, Sarah (2011). Early Islamic Iran. I. B. Tauris. ISBN 978-1780760612.
- Pezeshk, Manouchehr; Khaleeli, Alexander (2017). "al-Dīnawarī, Abū Ḥanīfa". In Madelung, Wilferd; Daftary, Farhad (eds.). Encyclopaedia Islamica Online. Brill Online. ISSN 1875-9831.
