= Al-Tuwal =

9th century Iraqi philologist

Al-Ṭuwāl (الطُّوال) The Grammarian (النحوّى)
- Born: Kūfah
- Other name: Muḥammad ibn Aḥmad ibn ‘Abd Allāh al-Ṭuwal the Grammarian
- Occupation: Professor of philology
- Years active: Abbāsid Era
- Known for: Arabic language grammatical analysis
- Title: Al-Ṭuwāl the Grammarian

Academic background
- Influences: Al-Kisā’ī and Al-Aṣma’ī

Academic work
- Discipline: Arabic philology
- Sub-discipline: Linguistic analysis
- School or tradition: Grammarians of Kufa

Al-Ṭuwāl the Grammarian (الطُّوال النحوّى), surnamed Abū ‘Abd Allāh (أبوعبد الله), or Muḥammad ibn Aḥmad ibn ‘Abd Allāh (محمد بن أحمد بن عبد الله). Al-Ṭuwal the Grammarian was a ninth-century philologist of the School of Kūfah.

== Life ==
He was a disciple of al-Kisā’ī and attended the lectures of al-Aṣma’ī. He moved to Baghdād where Abū 'Umar al-Durī al-Muqrī (أبو عمرو الدّورىّ المقرئ) (Note: Abū ‘Umar ‘Umar Hafṣ ibn al-Aziz ibn Suhbān (768 - 861) came from the Dūr Quarter on the East Bank of Baghdād and was a popular teacher at Sāmarrā. Cf. Ibn Khallikān, Wafayat, p.401, n.1.) was his disciple ('hearer'). Abū al-Abbās Tha’lab (أبو العباس ثعلب) said he was a skillful analyst (Note: bi-ilqā’ (بإلقاء) is translated as “analyzing” but is omitted in Flügel text of Al-Fihrist.) of Arabic grammar. No books of his are known. He died in 857-858 (243 AH).

== See also ==
- List of Arab scientists and scholars
- Encyclopædia Britannica Online

== Bibliography ==
- Nadīm (al), Abū al-Faraj Muḥammad ibn Isḥāq Abū Ya’qūb al-Warrāq (1970). Dodge, Bayard (ed.). The Fihrist of al-Nadim; a tenth-century survey of Muslim culture. New York & London: Columbia University Press.
- Flügel, Gustav Leberecht (1872). J. Roediger; A. Mueller (eds.). Al-Fihrist (in Arabic). Leipzig: F.C.W. Vogel. p. 653.
- Suyūṭī, Jalāl al-Dīn ‘Abd Al-Raḥmān (1909). Khānjī, Muḥammad Amīn (ed.). Bughyat al-Wu'āt fī Ṭabaqāt al-Lughawīyīn wa-al-Nuḥāh (in Arabic). Vol. 1. Cairo: Sa’ādah Press. p. 50.
- Zubaydī (al-), Muḥammad ibn al-Ḥasan (1954). Ibrāhīm, Muḥammad (ed.). Ṭabaqāt al-Naḥwīyīn wa-al-Lughawīyīn (in Arabic). Cairo: al-Khanjī. p. 151, note.
