= Abu Ubaid al-Qasim bin Salam =

Arab philologist

Abu Ubaid

Personal life
- Born: c. 154 AH/770 CE Herat, Abbasid Caliphate
- Died: 224 AH/838 (aged 68) Mecca, Abbasid Caliphate
- Era: Islamic golden age
- Main interest(s): History, Tafsir, Hadith, Fiqh

Religious life
- Religion: Islam
- Denomination: Sunni

Muslim leader
- Influenced by: al-Asmaʿi, Abu ʿUbayda, Sa'id ibn Aws al-Ansari, Abu ʿAmr al-Shaybani, al-Kisa'i, al-Farra and others

Abu Ubaid al-Qasim ibn Sallam al-Khurasani al-Harawi (Arabic: أبو عبيد القاسم بن سلاّم الخراساني الهروي, romanized: Abū ‘Ubayd al-Qāsim ibn Sallām al-Khurāsānī al-Harawī; c. 770–838) was an Arab philologist and the author of many standard books on lexicography, Qur’anic sciences, hadith, and fiqh.

He was born in Herat, the son of a Byzantine slave. He left his native town and studied philology at the Basra school under many famous scholars such as al-Asmaʿi (d. 213/828), Abu ʿUbayda (d. c.210/825), and Abu Zayd al-Ansari (d. 214 or 215/830–1), and at the Kufa school under Abu ʿAmr al-Shaybani (d. c.210/825), al-Kisaʾi (d. c.189/805), and others.

He was the first to develop a recorded science for tajwid, giving the rules of tajwid names and putting it into writing in his book called al-Qirā'āt. He wrote about 25 reciters, including the 7 mutawatir reciters. He made the reality, transmitted through reciters of every generation, a science with defined rules, terms, and enunciation. He wrote extensively on the originally revealed, but then abrogated, verses from the Qur’an.

== Selected works ==
- Kitab al-Amwal (The Book of Revenue)
- Kitab Al-Nāsikh wa-l-mansūkh (The Book of Abrogation)
- Kitab Fada’il-al-Qur’an (The Excellent Qualities of the Holy Quran)
- Kitab Al-Iman
