= Chaldean people =

Chaldean people may refer to:

- Ancient Chaldeans, ancient Semitic people in southern Mesopotamia
- Modern Chaldeans, modern self-identification of Chaldean Catholics

== See also ==
- Chaldean (disambiguation)
