= Mohammad Al Shaibani =

Mohammad Al Shaibani may refer to:

- Mohammed Al Shaibani, government official in Dubai, United Arab Emirates
- Muhammad Shaybani (c. 1451–1510), Uzbek leader
- Muhammad al-Shaybani, Medieval Arab jurist
