= Nabataeans of Iraq =

Islamicate term for native Mesopotamians

The Nabataeans of Iraq or Nabatees of Iraq (Arabic: نبط العراق, romanized: Nabaṭ al-ʿIrāq) was a name used by medieval Islamicate scholars for the rural, Aramaic-speaking, native inhabitants of central and southern Iraq (the Sawād) during the early Islamic period (7th–10th centuries CE). They are not to be confused with the ancient Nabataeans, a northern Arab people who established a kingdom at Petra during the late Hellenistic period (c. 150 BCE – 106 CE), and whom the Islamic-era Arabs seem to have called 'Nabataeans of the Levant' (نبط الشام, Nabaṭ al-Shām).

The Nabataeans of Iraq were strongly associated by their Muslim overlords with agriculture and with a sedentary way of living, as opposed to the nomadic lifestyle of the conquering Arabs. The Arabic term Nabaṭī (also Nabīṭ, plural Anbāṭ) was often used as a derogatory term, identifying anyone who did not speak Arabic and who maintained a rural lifestyle as lacking education and culture, or as being akin to farm animals. Thus conceived of as a kind of 'other' to the noble way of life maintained by the nomadic Arabs, the term also came to be used for the non-Arab rural inhabitants of other places, such as for example for 'Nabataean' Kurds (al-Nabaṭ al-Akrād) or 'Nabataean' Armenians (al-Nabaṭ al-Armāniyyūn).

The term 'Nabataeans of Iraq' appears to have been an exonym applied by the Arabs, not used by the Iraqi population to refer to itself. However, it was not always derogatory in meaning. As a general term for pre-Islamic Mesopotamian people, it was also used in a more positive way by learned authors such as the historian al-Mas'udi (died 956), who identified the ancient Babylonian kings as 'Nabataeans', stating that "these are the Nabataeans and others [...] It is they who erected the buildings, founded the cities, established the administrative divisions, dug the canals, planted the trees, sank the wells, worked the land."

Al-Mas'udi's knowledge of the history of Mesopotamia, being ultimately based on Greek sources, was quite impressive for his time. However, the fact that the Iraqi 'Nabataeans' whom he used as direct informants were speakers of Aramaic, a language best known in his time through its Syriac variant, led him to use the terms 'Nabataean' and 'Syrian' (Suryānī) interchangeably, applying them both to the various Aramaic-speaking Hellenistic kingdoms established in the Near East after the death of Alexander the Great in 323 BCE. Another name which al-Mas'udi sometimes used synonymously with both 'Nabataean' and 'Syrian' is 'Chaldaean' (Kaldānī), a similarly ambiguous term originally referring to the inhabitants of a small kingdom in southeastern Mesopotamia (Chaldea) but which came to designate Mesopotamia as a whole in the writings of Greek authors such as Aristotle (384–322 BCE), as well as in the Bible (both usages of which al-Mas'udi was aware). Since al-Mas'udi also believed the Parthians (whom he called Ardawān, perhaps after the several Parthian kings who carried this name) to have been 'Chaldeans', in his historical imagination the Syriac/Aramaic-speaking 'Nabataeans' or 'Chaldaeans' had ruled over Mesopotamia from the legendary times of Nimrod until the advent of the Sassanids in the 3rd century CE.

The Iraqi Nabataeans themselves, who were mainly peasants, seem to have had little knowledge about their own past. In this regard their case was similar to the Persians and other people with a long history before the advent of Islam, but it was exacerbated by the fact that most Iraqi Nabataeans had long since converted to Christianity, which tended to focus their interest on Christian salvation history rather than on their own pagan heritage. However, among those who had remained pagan there was a greater motivation to vaunt their glorious past as long-time rulers of the land. For example, the Nabataean scholar Ibn Wahshiyya (died c. 930 CE) claimed to be a descendant of the Neo-Assyrian king Sennacherib (r. 704 – 681 BCE), who was also more widely revered by pagan Nabataeans at the time as their illustrious ancestor.

It is also from the pagan peasantry that Ibn Wahshiyya got most of his local information when compiling his Nabataean Agriculture, an influential work containing a mix of folkloric and learned knowledge on agriculture, plants, magic, astrology, and various subjects related to religion and myth. Ibn Wahshiyya claimed to have translated this work from a c. 20,000 old original written in "ancient Syriac" (al-Suryānī al-qadīm), believing it to contain the first seeds of all human knowledge. Syriac, a language that originated in the 1st century CE, was commonly believed in Ibn Wahshiyya's time to have been the language spoken in Paradise and used at the time of creation. Thus, the whole of Mesopotamian history was imagined to have been a product of Aramaic (i.e., 'Syrian' or 'Nabataean') culture. In reality, the Nabataean Agriculture was likely translated from a Syriac work that was first composed on the basis of Greek and Latin agricultural writings and then gradually augmented with local material during the last few centuries before Ibn Wahshiyya's time. Together with al-Mas'udi's historical works, and like the latter written in the context of the Shu'ubiyya movement which sought to preserve and promote the heritage of non-Arab peoples, the Nabataean Agriculture is the product of a conscious attempt to write down what was known at the time about pre-Islamic Mesopotamian, 'Nabataean' culture, a subject for which it remains a valuable source today.

== See also ==
- Abu Amr Ishaq ibn Mirar al-Shaybani (died c. 821–831), a lexicographer and encyclopedist whose mother was 'Nabataean' and who had some knowledge of the language
- Ibn Sayyar al-Warraq, 10th-century author of a cookbook that contained a chapter with 'Nabataean' recipes
- Ibad, Christian Arabs of Hira, sometimes regarded as 'Nabateanized Arabs' or 'Arabized Nabateans'
- Marsh Arabs, the modern inhabitants of southern Iraq, who sometimes claim descent from the 'Nabataeans'
- Sabians, a Quranic epithet claimed by various religious sects, among them a group of Mesopotamian pagans who lived in southern Iraq during the early Islamic period
- Mandaeans, an Eastern Aramaic-speaking ethno-religious community historically dwelling in southern and central Babylonia, now southern Iraq and southwestern Iran. They have been associated with the Nabateans of Southern Iraq and are known for their distinct Gnostic beliefs, with a religious tradition centered around John the Baptist.
