= Deaths of Eminent Men and the Sons of the Epoch =

13th-century literary work by Ibn Khallikan

Wafayat al-A'yan
- Author: Ibn Khallikan
- Language: Arabic
- Subject: History, Biography
- Publication date: 13th century
- Publication place: Iraq

Deaths of Eminent Men and History of the Sons of the Epoch (Arabic: وفيات الأعيان وأنباء أبناء الزمان, romanized: wafayāt al-ʾaʿyān wa-ʾanbāʾ ʾabnāʾ al-zamān), is an eight-volume biographical reference dictionary of Islamic scholarship and literature authored by Ibn Khallikan and completed in 1274.

== Content ==
Ibn Khallikan collected 860 of leading personalities and scholars. This work is considered more comprehensive than any other Arab biographical dictionary. He documented the lives of notable cultural figures, the celebrated writers, aristocrats, scientists, religious and legal scholars, arranged in an alphabetic order. Complementary to the popular religio-political biographies of the Islamic prophet Muhammad and of the caliphs, it is primarily a literary work. The author selected authentic material for his biographies and with his intelligence and scholarship, he decided to write with an elegant language enriched with poetry and anecdotes of Muslim life. His book served as a valuable reference for his contemporaries and carries fragments from earlier biographies that no longer exist.

== Translation ==
An English translation by William McGuckin de Slane, in four volumes, published between 1801 and 1878, runs to over 2,700 pages.

== Reception ==
The British scholar Reynold A. Nicholson called it the "best general biography ever written".

== Influence ==
Ibn Khalikan's work influenced and encouraged two of his contemporary historians to follow his path: Al-Kutabi al-Halabi (d. 764.1326), who finished Ibn Khalikan's work with his work Fatwat al-Watfayat composing of 506 biographies: and Al-Safadi who wrote a book called Al-Wafi bi'l-Wafayat composing around 14,000 biographies. Finally, Al-Dimashqi (d. 726/1326 who authored Nukhbat ad-dahr fi 'aja'ib al-Barr Wal-Bahr.
