= Abu Amr Ishaq ibn Mirar ash-Shaybani =

Lexicographer-encyclopedist of the Kufan School of philology

Abū ‘Amr Isḥaq ibn Mirār ash-Shaybānī (d. 206/821, or 210/825, or 213/828, or 216/831) was a famous lexicographer-encyclopedist and collector-transmitter of Arabic poetry of the Kufan School of philology. Abu Amr was born in Kufa in the first quarter of the second/eighth century. A native of Ramādat al-Kūfah, who lived in Baghdad, he was a mawla (client) under the protection of the Banū Shaybān, hence his nisba. Descended from an Iranian landowning family (dehqān) on his paternal side, his mother was a 'Nabataean' (Aramaic-speaking, rural natives of early Islamic Iraq), and he reportedly knew a little of the 'Nabataean' language (an unattested form of Aramaic). The biographers al-Nadīm and Ibn Khallikān quote a claim by Ibn al-Sikkit's that he lived to the age of one hundred and eighteen and wrote in his own hand up to his death, in 213/828. However this is disputed by a claim that he died in 206/821 aged one hundred and ten, and this latter is deemed credible.

Abū 'Amr's teachers were Rukayn b. Rabī' ash-Shāmī, a transmitter of ḥadīth and al-Mufaddal ad-Dabbi, who developed his love of poetry. His son ‘Amr relates that he collected and classed poems, diwans (collections), from the jahiliyya (pre-Islamic) period from more than eighty Arab tribes. He wrote more than eighty volumes in his own hand and deposited these in the mosque of Kūfah.

The eminent scholars Ibn Hanbal, al-Kasim ibn Sallām, and Ibn as-Sikkit, the author of the Islāh al-Mantik, learned from him.

Of his lexicographical works, often of a very specialized nature, only the Kitāb al-Jīm (Kitab al-Lughat or Kitab al-Huruf), survives.

== Works ==
- The Strange in the Ḥadīth
- On Dialects, or Rare forms Known by the Jīm (the J); Kitāb al-Jīm, or Kitāb al-Hurūf, or Kitab al-Lughat
- The Great Collection of Anecdotes, or Rare Forms, in three manuscript editions, large, small, and medium;
- Treatise on Bees
- The Palm
- Treatise on The Camel
- The Disposition of Man
- Letters
- Commentary on the book “Eloquent Style”
- Treatise on the Horse

== book ==
Al-Jim is one of the first and oldest dictionaries that has been praised continuously and is compiled based on the letters of the alphabet. It seems that Abu Amr's intention in writing this book was to compile unfamiliar and far-fetched words. Al-Jaim's book has explained and interpreted One of the features of this book is that many dialects of different Arab tribes are recorded in it. In addition, the author has given the names of the people from whom he took the materials of the book, the book of Al-Jeem, which is the only remaining work of Abu Amr, this book is in 3 volumes, Ebrahim Abiari (Vol. 1), Abdul Alim Tahawi (Vol. 2). and Abdul Karim Ezbawi (Vol. 3) has been published in Cairo.

== Poets edited by Abū ‘Amr ash-Shaybānī ==
- Al-Ḥuṭay’ah
- Labīd ibn Rabī’ah
- Tamīm ibn Ubayy ibn Muqbil
- Durayd ibn al-Ṣimmah
- ‘Amr ibn Ma’dī Karib
- Al-A’shā al-Kabīr (Maymūn ibn Qays)
- Mutammim ibn Nuwayra
- Al-Zabarqan ibn Badr
- Ḥumayd ibn Thawr al-Rājiz
- Ḥumayd al-Arqaṭ
- Abu al-Aswad al-Du'ali
- Abū al-Najm al-‘Ijlī
- Al-‘Ajjāj al-Rājaz

== Sources ==
- Dodge, Bayard, ed. (1970). The Fihrist of al-Nadim, A Tenth-Century Survey of Muslim Culture. New York & London: Columbia University Press. ISBN 0-231-02925-X.
- Yāqūt (1993). Iḥsān ʿAbbās (ed.). Muʿjam al-udabāʾ. Vol. 2. Beirut. pp. 625–8.
- al-Qifṭī (1973) [1950]. Muḥammad Abū l-Faḍl Ibrāhīm (ed.). Inbāh al-ruwāt. Vol. 1. Cairo. pp. 221–9.
- Ibn Khallikān (1968). Iḥsān ʿAbbās (ed.). Wafayāt al-aʿyān. Vol. 1. Beirut. pp. 201–2.
- al-Ṣafadī (1971). Muḥammad Yūsuf Najm (ed.). al-Wāfī bi-l-wafayāt. Vol. 8. Wiesbaden. pp. 425–6.
- al-Suyūṭī (1964). Muḥammad Abū l-Faḍl Ibrāhīm (ed.). Bughyat al-wuʿāt. Vol. 1. Cairo. pp. 439–40.
- al-Suyūṭī (2005). Ḥasan al-Malkh and Suhā Naʿja (ed.). Tuḥfat al-adīb fī nuḥāt Mughnī l-labīb. Vol. 2. Irbid. pp. 613–7.

== Sources ==
- Versteegh, K. (1997). "al-S̲h̲aybānī". In Bosworth, C. E.; van Donzel, E.; Heinrichs, W. P. & Lecomte, G. (eds.). The Encyclopaedia of Islam, Second Edition. Volume IX: San–Sze. Leiden: E. J. Brill. pp. 394–395. ISBN 978-90-04-10422-8.
