= Khaldi =

Khaldi may refer to:

- Khaldi (god)
- Chalybes (Khaldi), a historical tribe in Anatolia
- Chaldia (Khaldia), a historical location of Anatolia
- Ishmael Khaldi (born 1971), Israeli diplomat

== See also ==
- Chaldean (disambiguation)
- Kaldi, legendary Ethiopian goatherd credited with discovering coffee
