= List of Islamic scholars described as father or founder of a field =

The following is a list of internationally recognized Muslim scholars of medieval Islamic civilization who have been described as the father or the founder of a field by some modern scholars:

- Abu al-Qasim al-Zahrawi: Father of Modern Surgery and the Father of Operative Surgery.
- Ibn al-Nafis: Father of Circulatory Physiology and Anatomy.
- Abbas ibn Firnas: Father of Medieval Aviation.
- Alhazen: Father of Modern Optics.
- Jabir ibn Hayyan: Father of Chemistry
- Ibn Khaldun: Father of Sociology, Historiography and Modern Economics. He is best known for his Muqaddimah.
- Ibn Sina(Avicenna): Widely regarded as the Father of Early Modern Medicine as well as the Father of Clinical Pharmacology. His most famous work is the Canon of Medicine.
- 'Ali ibn al-'Abbas al-Majusi: Also known as Haly Abbas is called Father of Anatomic Physiology. In addition, the section on dermatology in his Kamil as-Sina'ah at-Tibbiyah (Royal book-Liber Regius) has one scholar to regard him as the Father of Arabic Dermatology.
- Al-Biruni: Father of Indology, Father of Comparative Religion and Father of Geodesy for his remarkable description of early 11th-century India under Muslim rule. Georg Morgenstierne regarded him as the " founder of comparative studies in human culture." Al-Biruni is also known as the Father of Islamic Pharmacy.
- Al-Khwarizmi: Most renowned as the Father of Algebra Al-Khwarizmi had such huge influence on the field of mathematics that it is attributed to him the eponymous word 'algorithm' as well as 'algebra'.
- Ibn Hazm: Father of Comparative Religion and "honoured in the West as that of the founder of the science of comparative religion." Alfred Guillaume refers to him the composer of "the first systematic higher critical study of the Old and New Testaments." However, William Montgomery Watt disputes the claim, stating that Ibn Hazm's work was preceded by earlier works in Arabic and that "the aim was polemical and not descriptive."
- Al-Farabi: Regarded as founder of Islamic Neoplatonism and by some as the Father of Logic in the Islamic World.
- Ibn Rushd (Averroes) (1126-1198): Known in west as The Commentator has been described by some as the Father of Rationalism and the Father of Free Thought in Western Europe. Ernest Renan called Averroes the absolute rationalist, and regarded him as the father of freethought and dissent.
- Rhazes: His Diseases in Children has led many to consider him the Father of Pediatrics. He has also been praised as the "real founder of clinical medicine in Islam."
- Muhammad al-Shaybani: Father of Muslim International Law.
- Ismail al-Jazari: Father of Automaton and Robotics.
- Suhrawardi: Founder of the Illuminationist school of Islamic philosophy.
- Al-Tusi: Father of Trigonometry as a mathematical discipline in its own right.
- Seyyed Hossein Nasr: Father of Islamic ecotheology.
- Ahmed Zewail: Father of Femtochemistry.

== See also ==
- List of people considered father or mother of a scientific field
- Islamic Golden Age
- Science in medieval Islam
- Timeline of science and engineering in the Islamic world
