= Akhbar al-Tewal =

Book by Abū Ḥanīfa Dīnawarī

Kitab Akhbar al-tewal (Arabic: الأخبار الطوال) is an Arabic history book by the medieval Persian or Kurdish scholar Abu Hanifa Dinawari. The book is mentioned in many medieval sources and is currently printed as well. It entails a history from Adam until the Islamic period mostly focusing on the West of Asia.

== Content ==
The book has four main parts:

- Ancient Biblical and Koranic history of prophets (e.g., Adam)
- History of Pre-Islami kings (e.g., mythological kings like Jamshid and Sassanid kings)
- Islamic history and rise of Islam including history of Mohammad and caliphs
- History of Umayyad and Abbasid caliphs.

== Language and Style ==
The language of the text is Arabic. Dinawari writes in a concise, straightforward manner. Unlike al-Tabari, who often presents multiple versions of the same event with chains of transmission, Dinawari usually selects a single narrative and tells it continuously. This makes Akhbar al-Tewal more readable as a historical narrative but less explicit about competing traditions.

The book is written from a Persian point of view, is possibly the earliest apparent effort to combine Iranian and Islamic history. While historians such as al-Tabari and Bal'ami devoted the introduction of their work to long discourses on the duration of the world, Dinawari attempted to establish the importance of Iranshahr ("land of Iran") as the centre of the world. In his work, Dinawari notably devoted much less space to the Islamic prophet Muhammad compared to that of Iran. Regardless, Dinawari was a devoted Muslim, as indicated by his commentary on the Qur'an. He concluded the history with the suppression of Babak Khorramdin's rebellion in 837, and the subsequent execution of the Iranian general Khaydhar ibn Kawus al-Afshin.

Besides having access to early Arabic sources, Dinawari also made use of Persian sources, including pre-Islamic epic romances. Fully acquainted with the Persian language, Dinawari occasionally inserted phrases from the language into his work.

== Sources ==
- Herzig, Edmund; Stewart, Sarah (2011). Early Islamic Iran. I. B. Tauris. ISBN 978-1780760612.
