= Abu Bakr az-Zubaydi =

10th century poet, philosopher and scholar of Al-Andalus

Muḥammad ibn al-Ḥasan az-Zubaydī, Abū Bakr (محمد بن الحسن الزبيدي أبو بكر)
- Born: 918 or 928 [306 or 316 A.H.] Seville, Al-Andalus
- Died: 6 September 989 (aged 61) [379 A.H.] Seville, Al-Andalus
- Other names: Abū Bakr az-Zubaydī al-Andalusī, Muḥammad ibn al-Ḥasan az-Zubaydī al-Ishbīlī

Academic work
- Era: Caliphate of Córdoba (Ḥakīm II era)
- Main interests: poetry, philology, fiqh (law), etc.
- Notable works: Ṭabaqāt an-Naḥwīyīn wa-al-Lughawīyīn
- Influenced: Abū al-Walid Muḥammad (d. ca. 1048), son and pupil.

Abū Bakr az-Zubaydī (أبو بكر الزبيدي), also known as Muḥammad ibn al-Ḥasan ibn ‘Abd Allāh ibn Madḥīj al-Faqīh and Muḥammad ibn al-Ḥasan az-Zubaydī al-Ishbīlī (محمد بن الحسن الزبيدي الإشبيلي), held the title Akhbār al-fuquhā and wrote books on topics including philology, biography, history, philosophy, law, lexicology, and hadith.

== Life ==
Az-Zubaydī was a native of Seville, al-Andalus (present-day Spain), whose ancestor, Bishr ad-Dākhil ibn Ḥazm of Yemeni origin, had come with the Umayyads to al-Andalus from Ḥimṣ in the Levant (Syria). Az-Zubaydī moved to Córdoba, the seat of the Umayyad Caliphate, to study under Abū ‘Alī al-Qālī. His scholarship on the philologist Sībawayh’s grammar, Al-Kitāb, led to his appointment as tutor to the son of the humanist caliph Ḥakam II, the crown prince Hishām II. At the Caliph’s encouragement, az-Zubaydī composed many books on philology, and biographies of philologists and lexicographers. He became qāḍī of Seville, where he died in 989.

== Works ==
- Al-Istidrāk ‘alā Sībawayh fī Kitāb al-abniya wa’z-ziyāda ‘alā mā awradahu fīhi muhadhdhab (Rome, 1890) (Baghdād, 1970), (Riyadh, 1987)
- Ṭabaqāt an-Naḥwīyīn wa-al-Lughawīyīn (طبقات النحويين واللغويين) ‘Categories of Grammarians and Linguists’; (973–6) Biographical dictionary of the early philologists and lexicographers of the Basran, Kufan and Baghdād schools; almost contemporaneous with Ibn an-Nadim's Al-Fihrist. Both works bear witness to the emergence of the science of Arabic philology, and to the close intellectual contact between the Abbāsid and Umayyad seats of power at Baghdād and Cordoba, respectively. (Cairo, 1954)
- Akhbār al-fuquhā; al-muta’akhkhirīn min ahl Qurṭuba; History of the jurisconsults of Córdoba
- Amthilat al-abniya fī Kitāb Sībawayh Tafsīr Abī Bakr al-Zubaydī
- Basṭ al-Bāri’
- Al-ghāya fi ‘l-arūḍ
- Ikhtiṣār; Selections from Bukhārī’s Ṣaḥīḥ in Francisco Pons y Boigues
- Istidrāk al-ghalaṭ al-wāqi’ fī Kitāb al-‘Ayn (استدراك الغلط الواقع في كتاب العين)
- Laḥn al-‘awāmm (لحن العوام); dialectical speech errors; ed., R. 'Abd al-Tawwāb, Cairo 1964.
- Mukhtaṣar al-Ayn (مختصر العين) ‘Selections from Al-Ayn of Khalīl ibn Aḥmad’ (before 976)
- Al-Mustadrak min az-ziyāda fī Kitab al-Bāri’ alā Kitāb al-‘Ayn
- Ar-radd ‘alā Ibn Masarra, or Hatk sutūr al-mulḥidīn
- Risālat al-intiṣār li ‘l-Khalīl
- At-Tahdhīb bi-muḥkam at-tartīb (التهذيب بمحكم الترتيب) from the Laḥn al-ʻāmmah
- At-Taqrīz
- Al-wāḍīḥ fī ‘ilm al-‘arabiyya (الواضح في علم العربية); grammar after Sībawayh (Cairo, 1975), ('Ammān, 1976)
- Az-ziyadat ‘alā kitāb 'iṣlaḥ laḥn al-ʻaāmmah bi-al-Andalus (الزيادات على كتاب إصلاح لحن العامة بالأندلس)

== See also ==
- List of Arab scientists and scholars

== Bibliography ==
- Bābānī (al-), Ismāʻīl Bāshā (1955) [1951]. Hadīyat al-ʻārifīn (in Arabic). Vol. ii. Istānbūl: Wikālat al-Maʻārif. p. 51.
- Dhabbī (al-), Aḥmad ibn Yaḥyā ibn Aḥmad ibn 'Amirah (1884). Codera Zaidín, Francisco; Ribera, J (eds.). Bughyat al-multamis fī ta'rīkh rijāl al-Andalus (in Arabic). Baghdād: Maktabat al-mathnā. pp. 56–7.
- Dhahabī (al-), Muḥammad ibn Aḥmad (1958). Tadhkirat al-ḥuffaẓ (in Arabic). Hyderabad: Dairatu’l-Ma’ārif’l-Osmania.
- Dhahabī (al-), Muḥammad ibn Aḥmad (1985). al-'Ibar (in Arabic). Vol. ii. Beirut: Dār al-Kutub al-ʻIlmīyah. pp. 154–5.
- Dhahabī (al-), Muḥammad ibn Aḥmad (1996). "305". Siyar a'lām al-nubalā (in Arabic). Vol. 16. Bayrūt: Al-Resalah. pp. 417–8.
- Faraḍī (Ibn al-), ʻAbd Allāh ibn Muḥammad (2008). Tārīkh cUlamā al-Andalus (in Arabic). Vol. ii. Tunis: Dār Gharib al-Islāmī. pp. 120–1.
- Farḥūn (Ibn), Ibrāhīm ibn ʻAlī (2003). "477". al-Dībāj al-mudhahhab fī maʻrifat aʻyān ʻulamāʼ al-madhhab (in Arabic). Vol. ii. Maktaba al-Thaqafiya al-Diniya. pp. 203–4.
- Fīrūzābādī (al-), Muḥammad ibn Yaʻqūb (2000) [1987]. al-Bulghah fī tarājim aʼimmat al-naḥw wa-al-lughah (in Arabic). Damascus: Dār sʿad-ad-dīn. p. 219.
- Haywood, John A (1960). Arabic Lexicology Its History, and Its Place. Leiden: Brill. pp. 61–5. 12555.
- Ḥājjī Khalīfa, Muṣṭafa ibn 'Abd Allāh (1777). Herbelot, B. d'; Cousin, L.; Galland, A.; Reiske, J.J.; Schultens, H. A.; Visdelou, C. de (eds.). Bibliothèque orientale, ou Dictionnaire universel contenant tout ce qui fait connoître les peuples de l'Orient (Kaşf az-Zunūn) (in French). Vol. iii. La Haye, J. Neaulme & N. van Daalen. p. 619.
- Ḥazm (Ibn), ʿAlī ibn Aḥmad ibn Saʿīd (1948). Lévi-Provençal, Évariste (ed.). Jamharat ansāb (in Arabic). p. 412.
- ‘Imād (Ibn al-Ḥanbalī), ʿAbd al-Ḥayy ibn Aḥmad (1989). Shadharāt al-dhahab fī akhbār man dhahab (in Arabic). Vol. iv. Beirut: Dar Ibn Kathir. pp. 417–9.
- Ishbīlī (Ibn Khayr al-), Muḥammad (2009). Fahrasa Ibn Khayr al-Ishbīlī (in Arabic). Tunis: Dār al-Gharib al-Islāmī. p. 665.
- Khallikān (Ibn), Aḥmad ibn Muḥammad (1972). Wafayāt al-A'yān wa-Anbā' Abnā' al-Zamān (The Obituaries of Eminent Men) (in Arabic). Vol. IV. Beirut: Dār Ṣādar. pp. 372–74.
- Khāqān (Fatḥ ibn), Abū Naṣr al-Qaysī al-Ishbīlī (1983). Maṭmaḥ al-anfus wa-masraḥ al-taʼannus fī mulaḥ ahl al-Andalus (in Arabic). Beirut: Shar Suriyya. pp. 276–9.
- Krotkoff, Georg (1957), "The 'Laḥn al-'awāmm 'of Abū Bakr al-Zubaydī", Bulletin of the College of Arts and Sciences, 2, Baghdād: 247
- Mākūlā ('Alī ibn), Sa'd al-Muluk (1965) [1962]. Ikmāl (in Arabic). Vol. iv. Hyderabad: Ḥaydarābād al-Dakan. pp. 218–21.
- Maqqarī (al), Aḥmad Muḥammad (1968). Nafḥ al-ṭīb min ghuṣh al-Andalus al-raṭīb (in Arabic). Vol. 2–7. Beirut: Dār Sādr.
- Qifṭī (al-), ‘Alī ibn Yūsuf (1986). Inbāh al-rawāt (in Arabic). Beirut: Muʼassasat Kutub al-Thaqāfīyah. pp. 108–9.
- Qifṭī (al-), ‘Alī ibn Yūsuf (1975). Mamarī, Ḥasan; al-Jāsar, Ḥamad (eds.). al-Muḥammadūn min shu'arā (in Arabic). Dimashq: Majmaʻ al-Lughah al-ʻArabīyah bi-Dimashq. pp. 207–9.
- Ṣafadī (al-), Salah al-Dīn (2000). "815". In ʻAdnān al-Baḫīt, Muḥammạd (ed.). Al-Wāfī bi 'l-wafayāt (in Arabic). Beirut: Dar Ehia al-Tourath al-Arabi. pp. 259–60.
- Sa’īd (Ibn), ʻAlī ibn Mūsā (1964) [1955]. Al-Mughrib fī ḥulā 'l-Maghrib (in Arabic). Miṣr: Dār al-Maʻarif. pp. 255–6.
- Sam‘ānī (al-), ʻAbd al-Karīm ibn Muḥammad (1977). Ansāb (in Arabic). Vol. vi. Hyderabad: Dār al-Ma’ārif al-Uthmāniya. pp. 263–5.
- Bonebakker, Seeger (1961) [1960]. "Notes on Some Old Manuscripts of the Adab al-kātib of ibn Qutayba, the Kitāb aṡ-Ṡināʿatayn of Abū Hilāl al-ʿAskarī, and the Maṯal as-sāʾir of Ḍiyāʾ ad-Dīn ibn al-Aṯīr". Oriens. 13/14. Leiden: Brill: 174. JSTOR i271071.
- Sellheim, Rudolf (1955). "Reviewed Work: Ṭabaqāt an-naḥwīyīn wal-luġawīyīn by Az-Zubaidī, Muḥammad Abu l-Faḍl Ibrāhīm". Oriens (in German). 8 (2). Leiden: Brill: 346–348. doi:10.2307/1578904. JSTOR 1578904.
- Sellheim, R (2002), "Al-Zubaydī", Encyclopedia of Islām, vol. xi (New ed.), Leiden: E. J. Brill, pp. 548–9
- Shuhba (Ibn Qāḍī), Abū Bakr ibn Aḥmad (2008). "53". Ṭabaqāt al-naḥwiyyīn wa-'l-lughawiyyīn (in Arabic). Beirut: Dār al-Arabiya. pp. 64–5.
- Suyūṭī (al-), Jalāl al-Dīn ‘Abd al-Raḥmān (1965). Bughyat al-Wuʻāh fī Ṭabaqāt al-Lughawīyīn wa-al-Nuḥāh (in Arabic). Vol. 1. al-Qāhirah: Ṭubiʻa bi-mạṭbaʻat ʻĪsa al-Bābī al-Halabī. pp. 84–5.
- Tha’ālibī (al-), ʻAbd al-Malik ibn Muḥammad (1983). "97". Yatīmat al-dahr fī shuʻarāʼ ahl al-ʻaṣr (in Arabic). Vol. ii. Beirut: Dar al-Kutub al-Ilmiyah. pp. 80–81.
- Yāfi’ī (al-), ʻAbd Allāh ibn Asʻad (1997). Mirʼāt al-janān wa-ʻibrat al-yaqẓān (in Arabic). Vol. ii. Beirut: Dār al-Kutub al-ʻIlmīyah. pp. 307–8.
- Yāqūt, Shihāb al-Dīn ibn ‘Abd al-Ḥamawī (1993). "1036". In Abbās, Ihsan (ed.). Irshād al-Arīb alā Ma'rifat al-Adīb (in Arabic). Beirut: Dār Gharib al-Islām i. pp. 2518–21.
- Yāqūt, Shihāb al-Dīn ibn ‘Abd al-Ḥamawī (1913). Margoliouth, D. S. (ed.). Irshād al-Arīb alā Ma'rifat al-Adīb (in Arabic). Vol. VI (7). Leiden: Brill. pp. 518–22.
- Ziriklī (al-), Khayr al-Dīn (2007). al-Aʻlām, qāmūs tarājim li-ashhar al-rijāl wa-al-nisāʼ min al-ʻArab wa-al-mustaʻribīn wa-al-mustashriqīn (in Arabic). Vol. VI (17 ed.). Bayrūt: Dār al-ʻIlm lil-Malāyīn. p. 82.
- Zubaydī (al-), Muḥammad ibn al-Ḥasan (1890). Guidi, Ignazio (ed.). Kitāb al-Istidrāk 'alā Sībawayh (in Arabic). Rome.
- Zubaydī (al-), Muḥammad ibn al-Ḥasan (2000). Tawwāb (al-), Ramaḍān ‘Abd (ed.). Laḥn al-'awāmm (in Arabic) (2nd ed.). Cairo: Maktabat al-Khānjī. ISBN 977-5046-73-4.
- Zubaydī (al-), Muḥammad ibn al-Ḥasan (1993). Al-Saouri, Abdul Aziz (ed.). Al-ziyadat 'alā kitāb 'iṣlaḥ laḥn al- ʻaāmmah bi-al-Andalus (in Arabic).
- Zubaydī (al-), Muḥammad ibn al-Ḥasan (1954). Ibrāhīm, Muḥammad (ed.). Ṭabaqāt al-Naḥwīyīn wa-al-Lughawīyīn. Cairo: Al-Khanjī.
- Zubaydī (al-), Muḥammad ibn al-Ḥasan (2007) [1993]. Mukhtaṣar al-ʻAyn. Baghdād: Dār al-Shuʼūn al-Thaqāfīyah al-ʻĀmmah.
