= Al-Kisa'i =

8th-century founder of Kufi school of Arabic grammar

Al-Kisā’ī (الكسائي)
- Born: Al-Kūfah, Irāq
- Died: 804; Al-Rayy, Iran
- Other names: Abū al-Ḥasan ‘Alī ibn Ḥamzah ibn ‘Abd Allāh ibn ‘Uthman, (أبو الحسن على بن حمزة بن عبد الله بن عثمان); Bahman ibn Fīrūz (بهمن بن فيروز); Abū ‘Abd Allāh (أبو عبد الله).

Academic background
- Influences: Al-Ru’āsī, Al-Khalil ibn Ahmad al-Farahidi, Yunus ibn Habib, et al.

Academic work
- Era: Abbāsid Caliphate
- School or tradition: Grammarians of Kufa
- Main interests: philology, Arabic language, Bedouin poetry, idioms Quran
- Influenced: Hisham ibn Muawiyah and Al-Farrā'

Al-Kisā’ī (Note: Arabic: (الكسائي)) (Note: Full name: Abū al-Ḥasan ‘Alī ibn Ḥamzah ibn ‘Abd Allāh ibn Bahman ibn Fīrūz (أبو الحسن على بن حمزة بن عبد الله بن بهمن بن فيروز)) (d. ca. 804 or 812) was a Persian polymath and founder of the Kufan School of Arabic grammar. He directly served caliph Harun al Rashid as the Abbasid court tutor for two future caliphs. He is also called one of the ‘Seven Readers’ of the seven canonical Qira'at. (Note: Of the seven canonical transmitters, Ibn Amir ad-Dimashqi was the oldest and al-Kisa'i was the youngest.)

== Life ==
A Persian born in al-Kūfah, he learned grammar from al-Ru’āsī (Note: Abū Ja'far Muḥammad ibn al-Ḥasan ibn Abī Sārah al-Nīlī al-Ru’āsī (fl. time of Hārūn al-Rashīd), wrote first book on grammar. See Yāqūt Irshād VI (6), 480; Nadīm (al-), 76, 141-2, 145, 1084.) and a group of other scholars. It is said that al-Kisā’ī took this moniker from the particular kind of mantle he wore called a kisā’. (Note: Probably a short cloak as distinct from a ḥulal or ‘cloak’. Cloaks and mantles differentiated regional styles. see Khallikān, II, 238; Nadīm (al-) 144, n10)

Al-Kisā’ī entered the court of the Abbāsid caliph Hārūn al-Rashīd at Baghdād as tutor to the two princes, al-Ma’mūn and al-Amīn. His early biographer Al-Nadim relates Abū al-Ṭayyib's written account that Al-Rashīd held him in highest esteem. When the caliph moved the court to al-Rayy as the capital of Khurāsān, al-Kisā’ī moved there but subsequently became ill and died. During his illness al-Rashīd paid him regular visits and deeply mourned his death. It seems he died in 804 (189 AH) on the day that the hanīfah official of Al-Rashīd, Muḥammad al-Shaybānī (Note: Muḥammad ibn al-Ḥasan al-Shaybānī, Abū ‘Abd Allāh of Wāsiṭ, a judge under Hārūn al-Rashīd who died at Al-Rayy in 804. Enc. Islām IV, 271.) also died. It is also said he shared his date of death with the judge Abū Yūsuf in 812 (197 AH). When al-Kisā’ī died al-Farrā' was elected to teach in his stead, according to the account of Ibn al-Kūfī. (Note: Abū al-Ḥasan ‘Alī ibn Muḥammad ibn ‘Ubayd ibn al-Zubayr al-Asadī ibn al-Kūfī (ca. 868-960) was a scholar and calligrapher. See Khatib al-Baghdādī XII, § 81, 6489; Yāqūt Irshād, VI (5), 326; Nadīm (al-), pp. 6, 145, 151-8, 162, 173-4, 192, 864, 1033.)

=== Rival Schools ===
A famous anecdote relates a grammatical contest in Baghdad between the leaders of the two rival schools, with al-Kisā’ī representative of Al-Kufah, and Sibawayh of the Baṣrans. The debate was organized by the Abbasid vizier Yahya ibn Khalid , or according to some sources the caliph himself Harun, and became known as al-Mas'ala al-Zunburīyah (The Question of the Hornet). At issue was the Arabic phrase: كنتُ أظن أن العقربَ أشد لسعة من الزنبور فإذا هو هي\هو إياها I always thought that the scorpion is more painful than the hornet in its sting, and so it is (lit. translation). At issue was the correct declension of the last word in the sentence. Sibawayh proposed:

... fa-'ida huwa hiya (فإذا هو هي), literally ... sure-enough he she

meaning "so he (the scorpion, masc.) is she (the most painful one, fem.)"; In Arabic syntax the predicative copula of the verb to be or is, has no direct analogue, and instead employs nominal inflexion. Al-Kisa'i argued that the following form is also correct :

... fa-'ida huwa 'iyyaha(فإذا هو إياها), literally ... sure-enough he her

meaning "he is her". (Note: The difference has been compared to that in English between, for example, It is she and It is her, still a point of contention today.)

In Sibawayh's theoretical argument the accusative form can never be the predicate. However, when al-Kisa'i was supported in his assertion by four Bedouin -Desert Arab, whom he had supposedly bribed or they had perhaps supported him due to his closeness with the caliph- that the form huwa 'iyyaha, is also correct, his argument won the debate. Such was Sibawayh's bitterness in defeat, he left the court to return to his country where he died sometime later at a young age. Al-Kisa'i was accosted by one of Sibawayh's students after the fact and asked 100 grammatical questions, being proved wrong by the student each time. Upon being told the news about Sibawayh's death, al-Kisa'i approached the Caliph Harun al-Rashid and requested that he be punished for having a share in "killing Sibawayh."

== Legacy ==
Hishām ibn Mu'āwīyah (Note: Hishām ibn Mu'āwīyah al-Darīr (d.824) a grammarian and Qur'ānic reciter of Kufa who was blind. See Ibn Khallikan) and Yaḥya al-Farrā' were two notable students. The primary transmitters of his recitation method were Abū al-Ḥārith ibn Khālid al-Layth (d.845) and Al-Duri (Note: Abū ‘Umar ‘Umar Hafṣ ibn al-‘Aziz ibn Suhbān Al-Durī (d.861) from Baghdad was a popular teacher at Samarra.) (Note: Al-Duri was a transmitter for the method of Abu 'Amr ibn al-'Ala', the namesake of another one of the seven canonical recitations.)

Al-Naqqāsh (Note: Al-Naqqāsh, ‘Alī ibn Murrah, surnamed Abū al-Ḥasan, one of the people of Baghdād, the author also of Kitāb al-Ḥamzah’ and ‘The Eight Readers in Addition to the Seven,’ after Khalaf ibn Hishām al-Bazzār.) wrote Al-Kitāb al-Kisā’ī.and Bakkār (Note: Bakkār ibn Aḥmad ibn Bakkār, surnamed Abū ‘Īsā (d. 963), a Qur’ānic reader in Baghdād, author of The Reading of Ḥamzah.) wrote The Reading of al- Kisā’ī.

== Works ==
His list of works are:

=== Surviving works ===
- Mā Talḥanu fīhi al-ʿAwāmm (Errors in the Speech of the Common People)

A treatise on common linguistic mistakes and colloquial deviations from standard Arabic, regarded as the earliest surviving work devoted to this subject. It was first published by German Orientalist Carl Brockelmann in Zeitschrift der Deutschen Morgenländischen Gesellschaft with commentary Theodor Nöldeke. In 1926, it was edited by the Indian scholar ʿAbd al-ʿAzīz al-Maimānī and published in Cairo, and in 1982, it was critically edited and published by the Egyptian linguist Ramaḍān ʿAbd al-Tawwāb.

- Mutashābih al-Qurʾān (also known as Mushtabihāt al-Qurʾān; Similar Verses of the Qurʾān)

A work devoted to the verbal and structural similarities between Qurʾānic verses (mutashābih al-Qurʾān). According to al-Suyūṭī, it may be the earliest work composed in this genre.

The work is known under several titles, including Mutashābih al-Qurʾān, al-Mutashābih fī al-Qurʾān, Mushtabihāt al-Qurʾān al-ʿAẓīm, and Mā Tashābaha min Alfāẓ al-Qurʾān wa-Tanāẓara min Kalimāt al-Furqān. Fuat Sezgin suggested that these titles may reflect two distinct textual traditions. A versification of the work was written by Shams al-Dīn al-Sakhāwī (d. 1497).

Modern editions include those prepared by Sabīḥ al-Tamīmī (Tripoli, 1402/1982; reissued 1994), Muḥammad Muḥammad Dāwūd (Cairo, 1418/1998), Muḥammad b. ʿĪd (Ṭanṭā, 1427/2006), Muḥammad Ḥasan Āl Yāsīn (Amman, 1428/2008), and Aḥmad ʿAdnān Ṣāliḥ al-Ḥamdānī (Baghdad, 2014).

=== Lost works ===
- Maʿānī al-Qurʾān (Meanings of the Qurʾān)

Al-Kisāʾī's most famous work, transmitted by his student al-Dūrī. A chain of transmission (isnād) for the work is quoted by al-Azharī in Tahdhīb al-Lughah. It served as a direct source for al-Azharī and for al-Thaʿlabī's al-Kashf wa-l-Bayān.

According to a report, the rival grammarian al-Akhfash al-Akbar accused al-Kisāʾī of basing the work on a book that he had previously composed for his own use. By contrast, al-Dūrī highly praised the work, reportedly remarking that even after reading it ten times, one remained in need of returning to it again.

A modern reconstruction was undertaken by the Egyptian scholar ʿĪsā Shaḥātah ʿĪsā in 2014, who collected quotations attributed to the Maʿānī from approximately 120 sources and arranged them according to the order of the Qurʾān. The reconstruction was assessed by Weipert as providing few significant new insights and as not substantially improving knowledge of the original work's content, structure, or extent.

- Kitāb al-Qirāʾāt ("Book of the Qurʾānic Readings")

A work on the Qira'at of the Qurʾān. It is cited by al-Azharī in Tahdhīb al-Lughah, who quoted a chain of transmission (isnād) for the work.

- Kitāb al-ʿAdad (Book of [Verse] Enumeration)

A work on the enumeration of Qurʾānic verses according to the Kufan tradition of verse-counting.

- Ikhtilāf al-ʿAdad (Differences in [Verse] Enumeration)

A companion work to Kitāb al-ʿAdad dealing with disagreements among the various traditions of Qurʾānic verse enumeration. Ibn al-Jazarī gives its title as al-ʿAdad wa-Ikhtilāfuhum Fīh.

- Ikhtilāf Maṣāḥif Ahl al-Madīnah wa-Ahl al-Kūfah wa-Ahl al-Baṣrah (Differences between the Codices of the People of Medina, Kufa, and Basra)

A work documenting textual differences among the codices of Medina, Kufa, and Basra. The text survives in its entirety within Kitāb al-Maṣāḥif of Ibn Abī Dāwūd al-Sijistānī, where it is transmitted with a chain of transmission (isnād).

- Ajzāʾ al-Qurʾān (Divisions of the Qurʾān)

A work on the division of the Qurʾān into sections (ajzāʾ).

- Maqṭūʿ al-Qurʾān wa-Mawṣūluh (Separated and Conjoined Forms in the Qurʾān)

A work on the orthographic conventions governing word separation and conjunction in Qurʾānic writing.

- al-Hāʾāt al-Maknīyyu bihā fī al-Qurʾān (The Pronominal Hāʾ Forms Used Indirectly in the Qurʾān)

A specialized study of pronominal hāʾ forms used indirectly or euphemistically in the Qurʾānic text. al-Qifṭī records it under a variant title, Hāʾāt al-Kināyah fī al-Qurʾān.

- Mukhtaṣar fī al-Naḥw (Abridgement of Grammar)

A grammatical treatise and reportedly the most widely received of al-Kisāʾī’s works in the Andalusian tradition. Several Andalusian scholars are said to have composed commentaries on it. The grammarian Jūdī al-Naḥwī, a direct student of al-Kisāʾī, is reported to have transmitted the work to al-Andalus.

- Kitāb al-Ḥurūf (Book of Particles)

A work on Arabic particles (ḥurūf) and their usage.

- Kitāb al-Maṣādir (Book of Verbal Nouns)

A grammatical work dealing with verbal nouns (maṣādir) and their formation.

- Kitāb al-Hijāʾ (Book of Orthography)

A work on Arabic orthography and spelling conventions.

- al-Nawādir al-Kabīr (The Major Rare Expressions)

The largest of the three Nawādir compilations and the most extensively cited. al-Azharī quotes a chain of transmission (isnād) for the work in Tahdhīb al-Lughah. According to Fuat Sezgin, it circulated in three distinct recensions, including one transmitted via al-Farrāʾ. It served as a direct source for al-Azharī’s Tahdhīb al-Lughah, al-Ṣaghānī’s al-Takmilah and al-ʿUbāb, and is frequently cited in Tāj al-ʿArūs. Abū Miḥshal’s Kitāb al-Nawādir also drew heavily upon it. A passage is additionally preserved in quotation in Abū Ḥayyān al-Tawḥīdī’s al-Baṣāʾir wa-l-Dhakhāʾir.

- al-Nawādir al-Awsaṭ (The Middle Rare Expressions)

A middle-sized compilation within the Nawādir corpus.

- al-Nawādir al-Aṣghar (The Minor Rare Expressions)

The smallest of the three Nawādir works. Ibn al-Anbārī refers to it under the synonym title al-Nawādir al-Ṣaghīr.

- Ashʿār al-Muʿāyāt wa-Ṭarāʾiquhā (Riddle Poetry and Its Methods)

A work on the genre of Arabic riddle poetry. Ibn al-Nadīm records a variant corrupted title as Ashʿār al-Muʿānāh.

- al-Āthār fī al-Qirāʾāt (Transmitted Reports on the Readings)

Possibly a distinct work or an alternative title for Kitāb al-Qirāʾāt, or for a section thereof.

- Dīwān (Poetic Fragment Collection)

Recorded in the Fihrist as comprising approximately ten folios. Some verses are preserved in quotation in Muʿjam al-Udabāʾ and al-Durr al-Farīd. Tradition describes his poetic output as small but of good quality, although Yāqūt and Ibn Khallikān note that his expertise in poetry was limited.

- Kitāb al-Ḥudūd fī al-Naḥw (Book of Grammatical Definitions)

A grammatical work on definitions and technical terminology in Arabic grammar (naḥw). A manuscript was formerly held in Leipzig (Rifāʿīyah 354), though its current location is unknown. Its relationship to al-Kisāʾī’s Mukhtaṣar fī al-Naḥw also remains unclear.

== See also ==
- List of Arab scientists and scholars
- Encyclopædia Britannica Online

== Bibliography ==
- Flügel, Gustav Leberecht (1871). J. Roediger; A. Mueller (eds.). Al-Fihrist (in Arabic and German). Vol. 1. Leipzig: F.C.W. Vogel. p. 21.
- Flügel, Gustav Leberecht (1872). J. Roediger; A. Mueller (eds.). Al-Fihrist (in Arabic). Vol. 2. Leipzig: F.C.W. Vogel.
- Khallikān (Ibn), Aḥmad ibn Muḥammad (1843). Ibn Khallikān's Biographical Dictionary (translation of Wafayāt al-A'yān wa-Anbā'). Vol. I. Translated by MacGuckin de Slane. London: Oriental Translation Fund of Britain and Ireland. p. 401, n.1.
- Khallikān (Ibn), Aḥmad ibn Muḥammad (1843b). Ibn Khallikān's Biographical Dictionary (translation of Wafayāt al-A'yān wa-Anbā'). Vol. II. Translated by MacGuckin de Slane. London: Oriental Translation Fund of Britain and Ireland. pp. 237–9.
- Khallikān (Ibn), Aḥmad ibn Muḥammad (1868). Ibn Khallikan's Biographical Dictionary (translation of Wafayāt al-A'yān wa-Anbā' Abnā' al-Zamān). Vol. III. Translated by McGuckin de Slane, William. London: W. H. Allen.
- Nadīm (al-), Abū al-Faraj Muḥammad ibn Isḥāq Abū Ya’qūb al-Warrāq (1970). Dodge, Bayard (ed.). The Fihrist of al-Nadim; a tenth-century survey of Muslim culture. New York & London: Columbia University Press. pp. 79, 84, 112, 143, 144, 158, 191, 361, 365, 504. ISBN 978-0-231-02925-4.
- Mas'ūdī (al-), Abū al-Ḥasan ‘Alī ibn al-Ḥusayn (1871). Kitāb Murūj al-Dhahab wa-Ma'ādin al-Jawhar (Les Prairies d'or) (in Arabic and French). Vol. VI. Translated by Meynard, C Barbier de; Courteille, Pavet de. Paris: Imprimerie nationale. pp. 302, 319.
- Suyūṭī, Jalāl al-Dīn ‘Abd Al-Raḥmān (1909). Khānjī, Muḥammad Amīn (ed.). Bughyat al-Wu'āt fī Ṭabaqāt al-Lughawīyīn wa-al-Nuḥāh (in Arabic). Vol. 2. Cairo: Sa’ādah Press. pp. 162–4.
- Zubaydī, Muḥammad ibn al-Ḥasan (1984). Ibrāhīm, Muḥammad (ed.). Ṭabaqāt al-Naḥwīyīn wa-al-Lughawīyīn (in Arabic) (2 ed.). Cairo: Dar al-Ma'arif. pp. 127–30.
