= Ferdinand Wüstenfeld =

German orientalist (1808–1899)

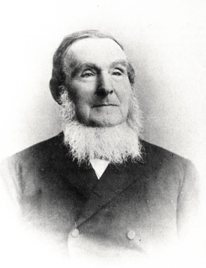
Heinrich Ferdinand Wüstenfeld

Heinrich Ferdinand Wüstenfeld (31 July 1808 – 8 February 1899) was a German orientalist, known as a literary historian of Arabic literature, born at Münden, Hanover.

He studied theology and oriental languages at Göttingen and Berlin. He taught at Göttingen, becoming a professor there (1842–90). He published many important Arabic texts and valuable works on Arabic history.

== Writings and translations ==
- Navavi, Liber concinnitatis nominum (1832)
- Dahabi, liber classium virorum qui karani et traditionum cognitione excellerunt (1833–34)
- Abulfeda, Tabulse quoedam geographica? (1835)
- Ibn Challikan, Vitae illustrium virorum (1835–50)
- Geschichte der Arabischen Ärzte und Naturforscher (1840)
- Navavi, Tahdhib al-Asma, Biographical dictionary of illustrious men (4 bd, 1842–47)
  - The biographical dictionary of illustrious men, chiefly at the beginning of Islamism; now first ed. from the collation of two mss. at Göttingen and Leiden (1842)
- Al-Maqrizi, Geschichte der Kopten (1846)
- Zakariya al-Qazwini, ‘Aja'ib al-makhluqat, Zakarija Ben Muhammed Ben Mahmud el-Cazwini's Kosmographie (2 vols, 1849)
- Ibn Coteiba, Handbuch der Geschichte (1850)
- Genealogische Tabellen der arabischen Stämme und Familien (1852)
- Register zu den genealogischen Tabellen der arabischen Stämme und Familien (1853)
- Ibn Dorejd, Kitab ul-Ishtiqaq, Genealogisch-etymologisches Handbuch (2 bd, 1854)
- Vergleichungstabellen der mohammedanischen und christlichen Zeitrechnung (1854)
- Ibn Hischam, Das Leben Mohammeds (4 bd. 1857-60)
  - Das Leben Muhammed's nach Muhammed Ibn Ishâk; (1858), Volume: v.01 pt.01
  - Das Leben Muhammed's nach Muhammed Ibn Ishâk; (1859), Volume: v.01 pt.02
  - Das Leben Muhammed's nach Muhammed Ibn Ishâk; (1860), Volume: 02
- Geschichte der Stadt Medina (1860)
- Chroniken der Stadt Mekka (4 bd, 1857–61)
- Jakut, Geographisches Wörterbuch (6 bd, 1866–73)
- Bahrein und Jemàma. Nach Arabischen Geographen beschrieben (1874)
- Die Statthalter von Agypten (1876)
- Qalqashandī, Aḥmad ibn ʻAlī (1879). Die Geographie und Verwaltung von Ägypten. Translated by Ferdinand Wüstenfeld. Dieterich.
- Das Heerwesen der Muhammedaner (1880)
- Geschichte der Fatimiden-Chalifen. Nach arabischen Quellen (1881) reprinted 1976
- Die Geschichtschreiber der Araber und ihre Werke. (1882)
- Die Çufiten in Süd-Arabien im XI. (XVII.) Jahrhundert (1882) (1883)
- Der Imam el-Schäfii und seine Anhänger (1889–91)
