= Al-Hutay'ah =

Pre-Islamic Arabian poet

Al-Ḥuṭayʾah
- الحطيئة
- Born: c. End of the 6th century CE; Najd
- Died: c. 670s
- Known for: Satirical Arabic poetry
- Works: Diwan al-Hutay'ah

Al-Ḥuṭayʾah (Arabic: الحطيئة) full name Jarwal ibn 'Aws al-Absi, was an Arab poet of pre-Islamic Arabia, who later converted to Islam. He was known for his extravagant satire and contributions to Arabic poetry. Aside from satire, Al-Hutay'ah also wrote poems with romance, praise, pride and freedom as themes; all of which have been published in the modern era.

== Biography ==
=== Lineage ===
His full name is Jarwal ibn 'Aws ibn Malik ibn Makhzum al-Absi. The lineage of Al-Hutay'ah is traced from there to the tribe of Qays which is descendants from the Arabian patriarch Adnan., his mother was an Nubian slave named Al-daraa

=== Pre-Islamic life ===
Al-Hutay'ah was a pioneer of pre-Islamic Arabic poetry and was known for being extreme in making fun of others in his poetry to the point where some of his contemporaries disliked him for that. The Abbasid historian and poet Abu al-Faraj al-Isfahani narrated in his Kitab al-Aghani that Al-Hutay'ah was a very eloquent poet with a bad reputation and was regarded to be evil and shameless by his pre-Islamic contemporaries.

=== After Islam ===
Al-Hutay'ah reportedly converted to Islam in the 7th century but later apostatized and then returned to Islam after the Ridda Wars for the rest of his life. There is a fable that he had an argument with a Sahaba, al-Zabarqan ibn Badr, and the Sahaba sent him to prison under orders of the Rashidun caliph Umar ibn al-Khattab. He was later released on a promise that he would maintain his good conduct and not make fun of other Muslims. The date of death of Al-Hutay'ah is unknown with a few historians speculating he died in circa the 670s.

== Poetry ==
=== Satire ===
Satirical poetry directed towards others was a speciality of Al-Hutay'ah. He would even make fun of himself. One such example was where he narrated about his reflection in the water.

Today I see a face for myself, for Allah has created it. What an ugly face, and how ugly is the one bearing it!

He also made fun of his father:

You are a good sheikh; you are a disgrace. You are a bad old man in the eyes of the noble ones. You accumulate hostility, may Allah not protect you from the doors of foolishness and misguidance!

=== Narrative poetry ===
Al-Hutay'ah composed poems in narrative poetry format. An example of this is his poem about generousity.

Three-folded abdominal bandages, in a wilderness where no one knows its inhabitants. My brother is lonely and isolated from friends, he sees misery in her from his ferocity, Na'ma. And he singled out an old man in the crowd opposite her, three kindred spirits you'd think they had. Barefoot and naked, they did not eat bread of the millet, for they have not known the taste of righteousness since they were created.

=== Themes ===
Aside from satire, Al-Hutay'ah wrote poems with themes that were romantic, praiseful or relating to freedom and joy.

== Published works ==
A collection of the poems of Al-Hutay'ah, known as the Diwan al-Hutay'ah, have been published in modern age. The 9th-century philologist, Yaqub Ibn as-Sikkit, wrote an annotated version of the Diwan and added a commentary to explain the meaning of the poems and the literary devices that were used in them.

== See also ==
- List of Arabic-language poets
