= Al-Ru'asi =

Abu Ja'far Muhammad ibn Abi Sara Ali Al-Ru'asi (Arabic: أبو جعفر محمد بْن أَبِي سارة الرُّؤاسيّ; died 187AH/802CE) was an early convert from Judaism to Islam and a scholar of the Arabic language. He is considered to be the founder of the Kufan school of Arabic grammar, as well as the first person to write about Arabic morphology and phonology. He was a student of Abu 'Amr ibn al-'Ala' and an associate of Al-Khalil ibn Ahmad al-Farahidi.

It has been suggested that Sibawayhi, the ethnically Persian Arabic grammar, borrowed heavily from the works of al-Ru'asi for the latter's infamous Kitab though there is no textual evidence to support this. We do know of a linguistic exegesis of the Qur'an complete with a glossary which was penned by al-Ru'asi, but it is no longer extant. Although he is regarded as the founder of the Kufan school, very few details are known about al-Ru'asi's life or his views on specific matters of dispute in Arabic grammar and he is rarely quoted by later grammarians.

== See also ==
- List of converts to Islam
