= Muhammad al-Shaybani =

Arab jurist and a disciple of Abu Hanifa (749/50–805)

Shaykh al-Islam; Muḥammad ibn al-Ḥasan al-Shaybānī

Personal life
- Born: 749 Wāsiṭ, Iraq
- Died: 805 (aged 55–56) Shahr-e-Ray, Abbasid Caliphate
- Era: Islamic Golden Age
- Region: Abbasid Caliphate
- Main interest: Islamic Jurisprudence
- Notable idea: Evolution of Islamic Jurisprudence
- Relatives: Al-Farra' (Cousin)

Religious life
- Religion: Islam
- Jurisprudence: Hanafi

Muslim leader
- Influenced by: Abu Hanifa
- Influenced: Hanafis

Abū ʿAbd Allāh Muḥammad ibn al-Ḥasan ibn Farqad al-Shaybānī (Arabic: أبو عبد الله محمد بن الحسن بن فرقد الشيباني; 749/750–805), commonly known as Imam Muḥammad al-Shaybānī, was an Arab Muslim jurist, legal theorist, and a leading authority of the Hanafi school of Islamic jurisprudence. He was one of the foremost students of Abu Hanifa and played a decisive role in preserving, systematizing, and transmitting Hanafi legal doctrine.

Al-Shaybānī later studied under Malik ibn Anas in Medina, which allowed him to engage directly with differing legal methodologies and contributed to the early development of comparative jurisprudence within Sunni Islam. His legal writings represent some of the earliest surviving systematic works of Islamic law and form a cornerstone of the classical Hanafi tradition.

He is particularly noted for his contributions to Siyar, the branch of Islamic law dealing with relations between Muslim and non-Muslim polities, warfare, treaties, and diplomacy, and is therefore regarded by modern scholars as a foundational figure in the development of Islamic international law.

== Early years ==
Muḥammad b. al-Ḥasan was born in Wāsiṭ, Iraq, in 750; soon, however, he moved to Kufa, the home town of Abū Ḥanīfa, and grew there. Though he was born to a soldier, he was much more interested in pursuing an intellectual career than a military one. Shaybani began studying in Kufa as a pupil of Abu Hanifa. When al-Shaybani was 18 (in 767), however, Abu Hanifa died after having taught him for only two years.

Shaybani then began training with Abū Yūsuf, his senior, and the leading disciple of Abu Hanifa. He also had other prominent teachers as well: Sufyan al-Thawrī and al-Awzāʿī. he also later visited Medina, and studied for two to three years with Malik b. Anas, founder of the Maliki school of fiqh. He taught in Kufa at age twenty (c. 770 CE)

== In Baghdad ==
Al-Shaybānī moved to Baghdad, where he continued his learning. He was so respected that Caliph Harun al-Rashid appointed him qadi (judge) of his capital city Raqqa (so, after 796 CE). Al-Shaybānī was relieved of this position in 803. He returned to Baghdad and resumed his educational activities. It was during this period he exerted his widest influence. He taught Muhammad ibn Idris ash-Shafi`i, the most prestigious of his pupils. Even later, when ash-Shafi'ī disagreed with his teacher and wrote the Kitāb al-Radd ʿalā Muḥammad b. al-Ḥasan ("Refutation of Muḥammad b. al-Ḥasan [al-Shaybānī]"), he still maintained immense admiration for his teacher.

Al-Rashid re-instated al-Shaybānī in a judicial position. The latter accompanied the caliph to Khorasan, where he served as qadi until his death in 805 at Rey. He died the same day and the same place as the eminent Kufan philologist and grammarian al-Kisāʾī. Thus, al-Rashid remarked that he "buried law and grammar side by side."

== Works ==
Al-Shaybani wrote Introduction to the Law of Nations ,(he also write Jami Al Jabir, Jami Al Saghir and more) at the end of the 8th century, a book which provided detailed guidelines for the conduct of jihad against unbelievers, as well as guidelines on the treatment of non-Muslim subjects under Muslim rule. Al-Shaybani wrote a second more advanced treatise on the subject, and other jurists soon followed with a number of other multi-volume treatises. They dealt with both public international law as well as private international law.

These early Islamic legal treatises covered the application of Islamic ethics, Islamic economic jurisprudence and Islamic military jurisprudence to international law, and were concerned with a number of modern international law topics, including the law of treaties; the treatment of diplomats, hostages, refugees and prisoners of war; the right of asylum; conduct on the battlefield; protection of women, children and non-combatant civilians; contracts across the lines of battle; the use of poisonous weapons; and devastation of enemy territory. The Umayyad and Abbasid Caliphs were also in continuous diplomatic negotiations with the Byzantine Empire on matters such as peace treaties, the exchange of prisoners of war, and payment of ransoms and tributes.

Al-Shaybani's siyar aims to answers questions like, "when is fighting justified", "who is the target of fighting" and "how is fighting conducted". For Al-Shaybani, a just cause of war was to spread the Islamic empire, either through increasing the territory of the Muslim states, or taking other states as clients. Other just causes included putting down rebellions (Muslim, dhimmi or apostate), punishing brigandry, and ensuring safety of lives and property from violence. Only those who presented a direct military threat were legitimate targets for deadly force. Thus the killing of women, children, old men, disabled, insane was prohibited. Captives in war are distinguished based on combatant status: male captives may be spared or killed, depending on what the commander deems is the best option. Al-Shaybani also explored the use of weapons (such as "hurling machines") which may inadvertently kill noncombatants. He opined it was permissible to use them so long as care was taken to aim at the combatants and effort was made to avoid killing noncombatants. Al-Shaybani's opinions in siyar were influential in the Hanafi school of thought, but diverged from Shafi'i opinions in several matters.

== Creed ==
Al-Shaybani explicitly negated the notion of confining Allah to a specific place. As As Abu al-Abbas al-Tathifi al-Tabari al-Hanafi, a prominent Hanafi jurist reports, Muhammad ibn al-Hasan stated in his book The Proofs Against the People of Medina: "Indeed, God Almighty is in every place, in the sense of management and creation." This indicates that Allah's presence is understood in terms of His authority, knowledge, and creative power, rather than spatial location. Since Al-Shaybani employed ta'wil (interpretation) when addressing divine attributes, he does not fit within the Athari framework, which avoids interpretive explanations. In this regard, his approach shows similarities to the Maturidi and Ash'ari positions, which also emphasize divine transcendence while interpreting attributes in a non-literal manner.

Similarly, in another narration, Muhammad ibn al-Hasan said: "Allah has not created any being independent of Him, but His Exaltedness is in authority and power. Our Lord has not established Himself in a manner imagined by the believer, neither by moving upward nor by ascending." This reinforces the view that Allah's attributes and presence are to be understood in terms of His authority and power, not physical location or motion.

== Early Islam scholars ==
Early Islamic scholars

Muhammad, The final Messenger of God (570–632) the Constitution of Medina, taught the Quran, and advised his companions
Abdullah ibn Masud (died 653) taught	Ali (607–661) fourth caliph taught	Aisha, Muhammad's wife and Abu Bakr's daughter taught	Abd Allah ibn Abbas (618–687) taught	Zayd ibn Thabit (610–660) taught	Umar (579–644) second caliph taught	Abu Hurairah (603–681) taught
Alqama ibn Qays (died 681) taught	Husayn ibn Ali (626–680) taught	Qasim ibn Muhammad ibn Abi Bakr (657–725) taught and raised by Aisha	Urwah ibn Zubayr (died 713) taught by Aisha, he then taught	Said ibn al-Musayyib (637–715) taught	Abdullah ibn Umar (614–693) taught	Abd Allah ibn al-Zubayr (624–692) taught by Aisha, he then taught
Ibrahim al-Nakha’i taught	Ali ibn Husayn Zayn al-Abidin (659–712) taught	Hisham ibn Urwah (667–772) taught	Ibn Shihab al-Zuhri (died 741) taught	Salim ibn Abd-Allah ibn Umar taught	Umar ibn Abdul Aziz (682–720) raised and taught by Abdullah ibn Umar
Hammad ibn Abi Sulayman taught	Muhammad al-Baqir (676–733) taught	Farwah bint al-Qasim Jafar's mother
Abu Hanifa (699–767) wrote Al Fiqh Al Akbar and Kitab Al-Athar, jurisprudence followed by Sunni, Sunni Sufi, Barelvi, Deobandi, Zaidiyyah and originally by the Fatimid and taught	Zayd ibn Ali (695–740)	Ja'far bin Muhammad Al-Baqir (702–765) Muhammad and Ali's great great grand son, jurisprudence followed by Shia, he taught	Malik ibn Anas (711–795) wrote Muwatta, jurisprudence from early Medina period now mostly followed by Maliki Sunnis in North Africa, and taught	Al-Waqidi (748–822) wrote history books like Kitab al-Tarikh wa al-Maghazi, student of Malik ibn Anas	Abu Muhammad Abdullah ibn Abdul Hakam (died 829) wrote biographies and history books, student of Malik ibn Anas
Abu Yusuf (729–798) wrote Usul al-fiqh	Muhammad al-Shaybani (749–805)	al-Shafi‘i (767–820) wrote Al-Risala, jurisprudence followed by Shafi'i Sunnis and Sufis, and taught	Ismail ibn Ibrahim	Ali ibn al-Madini (778–849) wrote The Book of Knowledge of the Companions	Ibn Hisham (died 833) wrote early history and As-Sirah an-Nabawiyyah, Muhammad's biography
Isma'il ibn Ja'far (719–775)	Musa al-Kadhim (745–799)	Ahmad ibn Hanbal (780–855) wrote Musnad Ahmad ibn Hanbal jurisprudence followed by Hanbali Sunnis and Sufis	Muhammad al-Bukhari (810–870) wrote Sahih al-Bukhari hadith books	Muslim ibn al-Hajjaj (815–875) wrote Sahih Muslim hadith books	Dawud al-Zahiri (815–883/4) founded the Zahiri school	Muhammad ibn Isa at-Tirmidhi (824–892) wrote Jami` at-Tirmidhi hadith books	Al-Baladhuri (died 892) wrote early history Futuh al-Buldan, Genealogies of the Nobles
Ibn Majah (824–887) wrote Sunan ibn Majah hadith book	Abu Dawood (817–889) wrote Sunan Abu Dawood Hadith Book
Muhammad ibn Ya'qub al-Kulayni (864- 941) wrote Kitab al-Kafi hadith book followed by Twelver Shia	Muhammad ibn Jarir al-Tabari (838–923) wrote History of the Prophets and Kings, Tafsir al-Tabari	Abu al-Hasan al-Ash'ari (874–936) wrote Maqālāt al-islāmīyīn, Kitāb al-luma, Kitāb al-ibāna 'an usūl al-diyāna
Ibn Babawayh (923–991) wrote Man La Yahduruhu al-Faqih jurisprudence followed by Twelver Shia	Sharif Razi (930–977) wrote Nahj al-Balagha followed by Twelver Shia	Nasir al-Din al-Tusi (1201–1274) wrote jurisprudence books followed by Ismaili and Twelver Shia	Al-Ghazali (1058–1111) wrote The Niche for Lights, The Incoherence of the Philosophers, The Alchemy of Happiness on Sufism	Rumi (1207–1273) wrote Masnavi, Diwan-e Shams-e Tabrizi on Sufism
Key: Some of Muhammad's Companions	Key: Taught in Medina	Key: Taught in Iraq	Key: Worked in Syria	Key: Travelled extensively collecting the sayings of Muhammad and compiled books of hadith	Key: Worked in Persia

== See also ==
- Abu Hanifa
- Abu Yusuf
- Sharia
- List of Islamic scholars described as father or founder of a field

== Bibliography ==
- Chaumont, E. (1997). "al-S̲h̲aybānī". In Bosworth, C. E.; van Donzel, E.; Heinrichs, W. P. & Lecomte, G. (eds.). The Encyclopaedia of Islam, Second Edition. Volume IX: San–Sze. Leiden: E. J. Brill. doi:10.1163/1573-3912_islam_COM_1051. ISBN 978-90-04-10422-8.
- Mahmassani, Sobhi. The Philosophy of Jurisprudence in Islam, translated by Farhat J. Ziadeh. Leiden: Brill, 1961.
- Schacht, Joseph. The Origins of Muhammadan Jurisprudence. Oxford: Clarendon Press, 1975.
- Weeramantry, Judge Christopher G. (1997), Justice Without Frontiers: Furthering Human Rights, Brill Publishers, ISBN 90-411-0241-8
- Bashir, K R. Islamic International Law: Historical Foundations and Al-Shaybani's Siyar, Edward Elgar. Publication Date: 2018 ISBN 978 1 78811 385 4
- Kelsay, John (2003). "Al-Shaybani and the Islamic Law of War". 2 (1). Journal of Military Ethics.
