= Chaldean =

Chaldean (also Chaldaean or Chaldee) may refer to:

== Language ==
- an old name for the Aramaic language
- Biblical Aramaic, which accounts for a small portion of the Bible
  - Chaldean misnomer, a historical incorrect term for Biblical Aramaic
- Suret, a modern Aramaic language spoken by Chaldean Catholics

== People ==
- Ancient Chaldeans, ancient Semitic people in southern Mesopotamia
- Modern Chaldeans, Assyrian people who are adherents of the Chaldean Catholic Church

== Places ==
- Chaldea, an ancient region whose inhabitants were known as Chaldeans
- Neo-Babylonian Empire, also called the Chaldean Empire
- Chaldean Town, a neighborhood of Detroit, Michigan, U.S.

== Religion ==
- Chaldean Catholic Church, Eastern Rite Catholic Church in full communion with the Catholic Church
- Chaldean Rite, the East Syriac Rite of the Chaldean Catholics
- Chaldean Oracles, texts widely used by Neoplatonist philosophers from 3rd to 6th centuries AD; referred to by some Christian church fathers
- Chaldean Syrian Church, title used for the Assyrian Church of the East in India

== Other ==
- Chaldean (horse) (foaled 2020), Thoroughbred racehorse

== See also ==
- Khaldi (disambiguation)
