= Ibn Durustawayh =

Persian grammarian and scholar (872–958)

Abū Muḥammad ʿAbdallāh ibn Jaʿfar (ibn Muḥammad) ibn Durustawayh ibn al-Marzubān al-Fārisī al-Fasawī al-Naḥwī, best known as Ibn Durustawayh (872 – May 958), was a Persian grammarian, lexicographer and student of the Quran and hadith. He was born in the Persian town of Fasa to Jaʿfar b. Durustawayh (died c. 896), and died in Baghdad.

== Sources ==
- Bernards, Monique (2020). "Ibn Durustawayh". In Fleet, Kate; Krämer, Gudrun; Matringe, Denis; Nawas, John; Rowson, Everett (eds.). Encyclopaedia of Islam (3rd ed.). Brill Online. ISSN 1873-9830.
- Bonebakker, Seeger A. (1997). "EBN DOROSTAWAYH, ABŪ MOḤAMMAD ʿABD-ALL". In Yarshater, Ehsan (ed.). Encyclopædia Iranica. Vol. VIII/1: Ebn ʿAyyāš–Economy V. London and New York: Routledge & Kegan Paul. p. 13. ISBN 978-1-56859-050-9.
