= William McGuckin de Slane =

Irish orientalist (1801–1878)

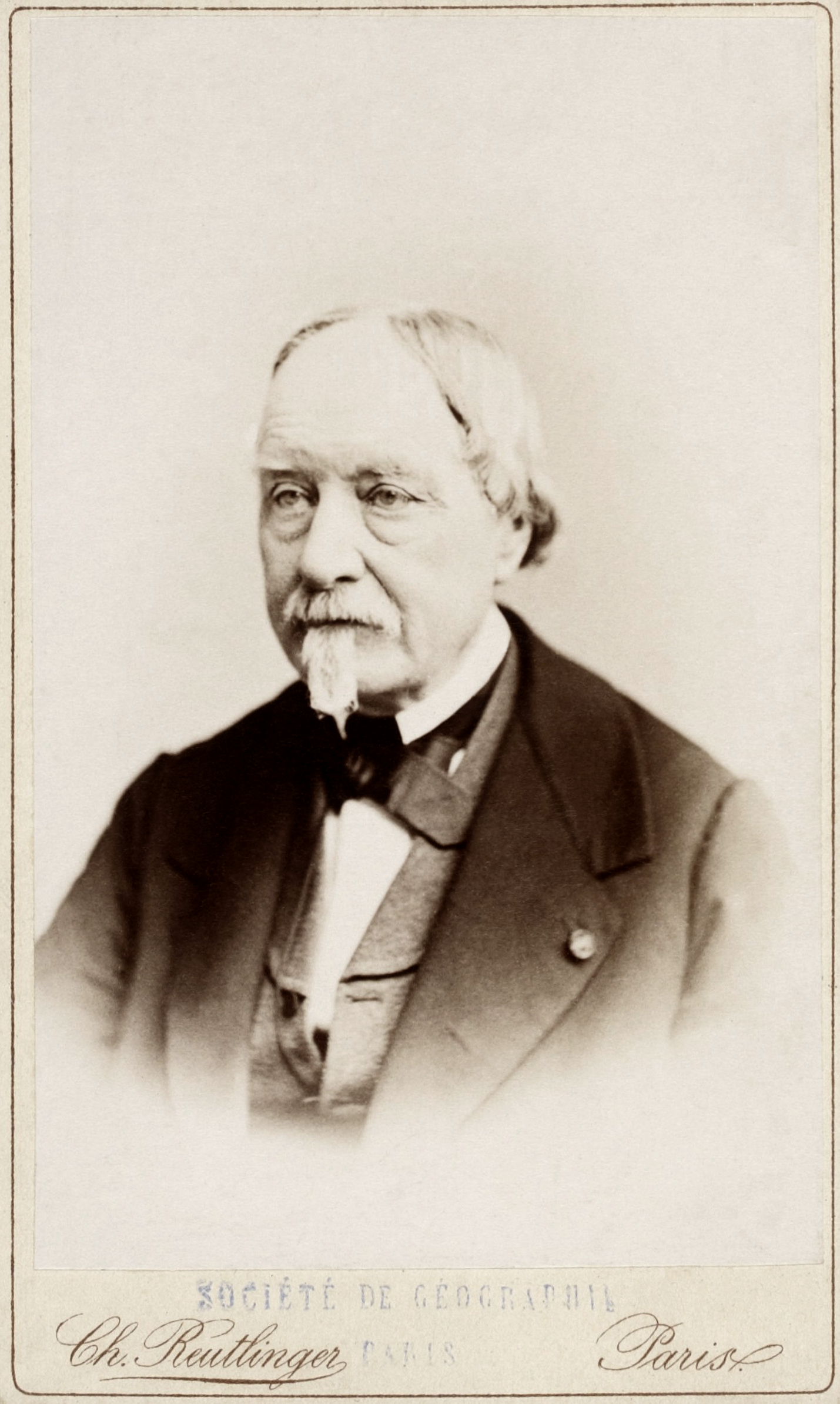
- de Slane photographed by Charles Reutlinger (1873)
- Born: William McGuckin; 12 August 1801; Belfast, Ireland
- Died: 4 August 1878 (aged 76); Passy, Paris, France
- Citizenship: French (1838–)
- Education: Trinity College Dublin
- Occupations: Orientalist; philologist; academic; Interpreter
- Spouse(s): Angadrème Sophie Félicité de la Barre de Mérona (m. 1826; died 1833) Anne Elise Sutton de Clonard
- Children: 5

William McGuckin (Note: Alternatively spelt as Mac Guckin or MacGuckin) (12 August 1801 – 4 August 1878), known as Baron de Slane, was an Irish orientalist, philologist, academic and Principal Interpreter to the French African Army.

== Biography ==
De Slane was born in Belfast, the son of James McGuckin and Euphemia Hughes. After graduating from Trinity College Dublin, in 1822 he moved to Paris and studied oriental languages under Silvestre de Sacy.

In 1828 he was admitted to the Société Asiatique, a French learned society. The society financed Joseph Toussaint Reinaud and de Slane to prepare a critical edition of Abu'l-Fida (أبو الفداء)'s Arabic geography, Taqwīm al-Buldān (تقويم البلدان) – "Locating the Lands" (1321). This was published in 1840.

Between 1843 and 1846 he was sent on a mission by the French Government to catalogue important documents in the libraries of Algiers and Constantine. During this time he also served as an Interpreter of Arabic in the French African Army and in 1846 he was appointed as Principal Interpreter for the French African army. He served as Professor of Arabic at the École de langues orientales in Paris and from 1849 also taught Turkish. He was also commissioned by the Bibliothèque Nationale to catalogue their Arabic manuscripts.

On 30 October 1826 he married Angadrème Sophie Félicité de la Barre de Mérona. She died seven years later on 24 September 1833. He then married Anne Elise Sutton de Clonard and together they had five children. De Slane was awarded French citizenship on 31 December 1838. He died aged 76 in Passy, France on 4 August 1878.

In France he was awarded following honours:

- Chevalier of the Legion of Honour, 24 September 1846
- Officer of the Legion of Honour, 26 December 1852
- Officer of the Instruction Publique
- Officer of the Order of Saints Maurice and Lazarus, awarded by King of Sardinia
- Elected Member, 1862, of the Institut de France
- Founding Member of the Association Historique Algérienne

== Selected publications ==
Arabic text of Abu'l-Fida's Takwin al-Buldan, one volume, 1840

- Reinaud, Joseph Toussaint; de Slane, Baron Mac Guckin, eds. (1840). Géographie d'Aboulféda; texte arabe publié d'après les manuscrits de Paris et de Leyde aux frais de la Société Asiatique (in French and Arabic). Paris: Imprimerie Royale.

Translation of a section of Ibn Battuta's rihla, 1843

- de Slane, Baron (1843). "Voyage dans la Soudan par Ibn Batouta". Journal Asiatique. Series 4 (in French). 1 (March): 181–240.

Translation of Ibn Khallikan's biographical dictionary, four volumes, 1843–1871

- Ibn Khallikan (1842). Ibn Khallikan's Biographical Dictionary, Translated from the Arabic. Vol. I. Translated by Baron Mac Guckin de Slane. Paris: Oriental Translation Fund of Great Britain and Ireland. OCLC 1184199260.
- Ibn Khallikan (1843). Ibn Khallikan's Biographical Dictionary, Translated from the Arabic. Vol. II. Translated by Baron Mac Guckin de Slane. Paris: Oriental Translation Fund of Great Britain and Ireland. OCLC 832287342.
- Ibn Khallikan (1868). Ibn Khallikan's Biographical Dictionary, Translated from the Arabic. Vol. III. Translated by Baron Mac Guckin de Slane. Paris: Oriental Translation Fund of Great Britain and Ireland. OCLC 1204465708.
- Ibn Khallikan (1871). Ibn Khallikan's Biographical Dictionary, Translated from the Arabic. Vol. IV. Translated by Baron Mac Guckin de Slane. Paris: Oriental Translation Fund of Great Britain and Ireland. OCLC 1204583307.

Arabic text of Ibn Khaldun's Histoire des Berbères, 2 volumes, 1847–1851

- Ibn-Khaldoun (1847). Histoire des Berbères et des dynasties musulmanes de l'Afrique septentrionale (Arabic text, Volume 1) (in Arabic and French). Baron de Slane, editor. Algers: Imprimerie du Gouvernment.
- Ibn-Khaldoun (1851). Histoire des Berbères et des dynasties musulmanes de l'Afrique septentrionale (Arabic text, Volume 2) (in Arabic and French). Baron de Slane, editor. Algers: Imprimerie du Gouvernment.

Translation of Ibn Khaldun's Histoire des Berbères, 4 volumes, 1852–1856

- Ibn Khaldoun (1852). Histoire des Berbères et des dynasties musulmanes de l'Afrique septentrionale (Volume 1) (in French). Baron de Slane, translator. Algers: Imprimerie du Gouvernment.
- Ibn Khaldoun (1854). Histoire des Berbères et des dynasties musulmanes de l'Afrique septentrionale (Volume 2) (in French). Baron de Slane, translator. Algers: Imprimerie du Gouvernment.
- Ibn Khaldoun (1856). Histoire des Berbères et des dynasties musulmanes de l'Afrique septentrionale (Volume 3) (in French). Baron de Slane, translator. Algers: Imprimerie du Gouvernment.
- Ibn Khaldoun (1856). Histoire des Berbères et des dynasties musulmanes de l'Afrique septentrionale (Volume 4) (in French). Baron de Slane, translator. Algers: Imprimerie du Gouvernment.

Translation of Al-Bakri, 1859, one volume

- El-Bekri (1859). Description de l'Afrique septentrionale. Mac Guckin de Slane, translator and editor. Paris: Imprimerie Impériale. Revised edition with corrections (1913), Tangiers: Adolphe Jourdan.

Translation of Ibn Khaldun's Muqaddimah (Prolegomena), three volumes, 1863-1868

- Ibn Khaldoun (1863). Les prolégomènes d'Ibn Khaldoun (Volume 1) (in French). de Slane, editor and translator. Paris: Imprimerie Impériale.
- Ibn Khaldoun (1865). Les prolégomènes d'Ibn Khaldoun (Volume 2) (in French). de Slane, editor and translator. Paris: Imprimerie Impériale.
- Ibn Khaldoun (1868). Les prolégomènes d'Ibn Khaldoun (Volume 3) (in French). de Slane, editor and translator. Paris: Imprimerie Impériale.
- de Slane, Baron (1845). Rapport adressé à M. le ministre de l'instruction publique; suivi du Catalogue des manuscrits arabes les plus importants de la bibliothèque d'Alger et de la bibliothèque de Cid-hammouda à Constantine (in French). Paris: P. Dupont.
- de Slane, Baron (1883–1895). Département des Manuscrits: Catalogue des manuscrits arabes (in French). Paris: Bibliothèque nationale.
