= Gustav Leberecht Flügel =

German orientalist (1802–1870)

Gustav Leberecht Flügel (February 18, 1802 – July 5, 1870) was a German orientalist.

== Life ==
After attending high school in his native city Flügel studied theology and philosophy in Leipzig. He soon discovered his passion for oriental languages, which he studied in Vienna and Paris. In 1832 he became a professor at the Fürstenschule (Ducal or Princely school) of St. Afra in Meissen. However, he resigned in 1850 on health grounds. From 1851 he worked at the Fürstenbibliothek in Vienna on the cataloguing of Arabic, Turkish and Persian manuscripts. In December 1857 he became a corresponding member of the Russian Academy of Sciences in Saint Petersburg and, in 1859, a full member of the Saxon Academy of Sciences. In 1864 he was admitted as a foreign member of the Bavarian Academy of Sciences.

Flügel 's main work was the creation of a bibliographic and encyclopaedic lexicon of Haji Khalfa, with Latin translation (London and Leipzig, 1835-1858). Particular importance was attached to his edition of the Qur’ān, printed in Leipzig (1834 and 1893) by the printer and publisher Carl Christoph Traugott Tauchnitz. This made a reliable Quranic text available for the first time to European science. In the following years, almost all translations into European languages were based on Flügel's edition.

He died at Dresden.

== Family ==
Flügel was married. His son Josef died in 1910 at Oberlandesgerichtsrat in Dresden.

== Works, Translations, Critical Essays and Articles ==
- The Quran, (Leipzig, 1834 and 1893)
- Bibliographical and Encyclopaedic Lexicon - (Arabic title Kaşf az-Zunūn by Hadi Khalfa; Arabic with parallel Latin translation in 7 vols., London and Leipzig, 1835–1858). Flügel's magnum opus.
- Dissertatio de Arabicis Scriptorum Graecorum Interpretibus, in Memoriam Anniversariam Scholae Regiae Afranae. (Meisen, Klinkicht, 1841)
- Concordantiae Corani Arabicae (Leipzig, Bredtil, 1842, 1875 and 1898)
- Kitab al-Fihrist by Isḥāq al-Nadīm, ed. Flügel (Leipzig, Vogel, 1871) Published posthumously.
- Zur Frage über die Romane und Erzahlungen der Mohammedanischen Völkerschaften, Zeitschrift Der Deutschen Morganländischen Gesellschaft, XXII (1868), 731–38.
- Babek, seine Abstammung und Erstes Auftreten, ibid., XXI (1869), 1-42.

== Publications ==
- Lexicon bibliographicum et encyclopaedicum (Translation of "Al-Kashf Az-Zunun" by Kâtip Çelebi) (Vol.,1; Leipzig, 1835) (Vol.,2; Leipzig, 1837) (Vol.,3; London, 1842) (Vol.,4; London, 1845) (Vol.,5; London, 1850) (Vol.,6; London, 1852)
- Corani Textus Arabicus (Leipzig, 1834, various reprints down to 1922)
- Concordantiae Corani arabicae (Leipzig, 1842 and 1898)
- Mani, Seine Lehren und Seine Schriften (Mani, his teachings and his writings) (Leipzig, 1862)
- Die Grammatischen Schulen der Araber (The Grammar Schools of Arabic) (London, 1862)
- Ibn Kutlulbugas Krone der Lebensbeschreibungen (Leipzig, 1862)
- Kitab al-Fihrist (published posthumously)
