= Ibn Khallikan =

Muslim historian (1211–1282)

Shams al-Dīn Abū Al-ʿAbbās Aḥmad Ibn Muḥammad Ibn Khallikān
- ابن خلكان
- Title: Chief Judge

Personal life
- Born: 22 September 1211 Erbil
- Died: 30 October 1282 (aged 71) Damascus, Mamluk Sultanate
- Region: Middle East
- Notable work: Deaths of Eminent Men and History of the Sons of the Epoch

Religious life
- Religion: Islam
- Denomination: Sunni
- Jurisprudence: Shafi'i
- Creed: Ash'ari

Shams al-Din Aḥmad bin Muḥammad bin Ibrāhīm bin Abū Bakr ibn Khallikān (Note: Also known as Abū ʾl-ʿAbbās S̲h̲ams al-Dīn al-Barmakī al-Irbilī al-S̲h̲āfiʿī (Arabic: أبو العباس شمس الدين البرمكي الأربلي الشافعي)) (Arabic: أحمد بن محمد بن إبراهيم بن أبي بكر ابن خلكان; 22 September 1211 – 30 October 1282), better known as Ibn Khallikān, was a renowned Islamic historian who compiled the celebrated biographical encyclopedia of Muslim scholars and important men in Muslim history, Deaths of Eminent Men and the Sons of the Epoch (Arabic: وفيات الأعيان وأنباء أبناء الزمان, romanized: wafayāt al-ʾaʿyān wa-ʾanbāʾ ʾabnāʾ al-zamān). Due to this achievement, he is regarded as the most eminent writer of biographies in Islamic history.

== Life ==
Ibn Khallikān was born in Erbil on 22 September 1211 (11 Rabīʿ al-Thānī 608 AH). He was an Arabic biographer from an Arab family that claimed descent from the Barmakids. However, Ibn Khallikān's family has also been described to be of Kurdish origin, specifically from the Kurdish Zarzārī tribe, as the family name ("Ibn Khallikān") originated from a village near Erbil and was formed "according to the Kurdish manner" (ʿalā ṭarīq al-nisba al-kurdiyya).

His primary studies took him from Erbil, to Aleppo and to Damascus, before he took up jurisprudence in Mosul and then in Cairo, where he settled. He gained prominence as a jurist, theologian and grammarian. An early biographer described him as "a pious man, virtuous, and learned; amiable in temper, in conversation serious and instructive. His exterior was highly prepossessing, his countenance handsome and his manners engaging."

He married in 1252 and was assistant to the chief judge in Egypt until 1261, when he assumed the position of chief judge in Damascus. He lost this position in 1271 and returned to Egypt, where he taught until being reinstated as judge in Damascus in 1278. He retired in 1281 and died in Damascus on 30 October 1282 (Saturday, 26th of Rajab 681).

== Bibliography ==
- Ibn Khallikan (1842–1871). Ibn Khallikan's Biographical Dictionary, Translated from the Arabic (4 vols.). Translated by Baron Mac Guckin de Slane. Paris: Oriental Translation Fund of Great Britain and Ireland.
