= Atharism =

School of theology in Sunni Islam

Atharism (Arabic: الأثرية, romanized: al-ʾAthariyya / al-aṯariyyah [æl ʔæθæˈrɪj.jæ], "of athar") is a school of theology in Sunni Islam which developed from circles of the Ahl al-Hadith, a group that rejected rationalistic theology in favor of strict textualism in interpreting the Quran and the hadith.

Adherents of Athari theology believe the zahir (apparent) meaning of the Quran and the hadith are the sole authorities in matters of aqida and Islamic jurisprudence; and that the use of rational disputation is forbidden, even if in verifying the truth. Atharis oppose the use of metaphorical interpretation regarding the anthropomorphic descriptions and attributes of God (ta'wil) and do not attempt to conceptualize the meanings of the Quran by using philosophical principles since they believe that their realities should be consigned to God and Muhammad alone (tafwid). In essence, they assert that the literal meaning of the Quran and the ḥadīth must be accepted without a "how" (i.e. "Bi-la kayfa").

Athari theology emerged among hadith scholars who eventually coalesced into a movement called Ahl al-Ḥadīth under the leadership of Ahmad ibn Hanbal (780–855). In matters of faith, they were pitted against Mu'tazilites and other theological Islamic currents and condemned many points of their doctrine as well as the philosophical methods they used. Atharism is the school of theology used by Hanbalis.

== Terminology ==
Several terms are used to refer to Athari theology or Atharism. They are used inconsistently, and some of them have been subject to criticism.

The designation Traditionalist Theology is derived from the word "tradition" in its technical meaning as translation of the Arabic term ḥadīth. This term is found in a number of reference works. It has been criticized by Marshall Hodgson (who preferred the term Hadith folk) for its potential for confusion between the technical and common meanings of the word "tradition". Oliver Leaman also cautions against misinterpreting the terms "traditionalists" and "rationalists" as implying that the former favored irrationality or that the latter did not use the ḥadīth. Some authors reject the use of these terms as labels for groups of scholars and prefer to speak of "traditionalist" and "rationalist" tendencies instead. Racha el Omari has applied the designation traditionalist theology in a way that includes both Ashʿarism and Māturīdism.

Athari (from the Arabic word athar, meaning "remnant" or "effect") is another term that has been used for traditionalist theology. The term Traditionism has also been used in the same sense, although Binyamin Abrahamov reserves the term "traditionists" for scholars of the Hadith, distinguishing it from traditionalism as a theological current. The term "Ahl al-Ḥadīth" ("People of the Tradition") is used by some authors in the same sense as Athari, while others restrict it to the early stages of this movement, or use it in a broader sense to denote particular enthusiasm towards the ḥadīth literature.

Since the overwhelming majority of Muslim scholars in the Hanbali school of jurisprudence has adhered to the Athari creed (ʿaqīdah), many sources refer to it as "Hanbali theology", although Western scholars of Islamic studies remark that it would be incorrect to consider Atharism and Hanbalism as synonymous, since there have been Hanbalite scholars who have explicitly rejected and opposed the Athari theology. However, others note that some Shafiʽi scholars also belonged to this theological school, while some Hanbalites in law adopted a more rationalist school in theology. Moreover, extreme forms of traditionalism had not been confined within Hanbalism, and is also part of Maliki, Shafi'i and Hanafi schools. Some authors refer to traditionalist theology as "classical Salafism" or "classic Salafiyyah" (from salaf, meaning "(pious) ancestors"). Henri Lauzière has argued that, while the majority Hanbali creed was sometimes identified as "Salafi" in classical-era sources, using the corresponding nouns in this context is anachronistic.

It is also known as Traditionalist theology or Scripturalist theology. (Note: "Athari or traditionalist theological school.. defines the attributes and nature of God based on the literal interpretation of the scripture": Pall, Zoltan (2018). "Introduction". Salafism in Lebanon: Local and Transnational Movements. New York, NY: Cambridge University Press. p. 16. ISBN 978-1-108-42688-6.; Abrahamov (2016, pp. 263–279)) it emerged as a school of theology in the late 8th century CE from the scholarly circles of Ahl al-Hadith, an early Islamic religious movement that rejected the formulation of Islamic doctrine derived from rationalistic Islamic theology (kalām) in favor of strict textualism in interpreting the Quran and the ḥadīth. The name derives from "tradition" in its technical sense as a translation of the Arabic word athar. Its adherents are referred to by several names such as "Ahl al-Athar", "Ahl al-Hadith", etc.

== History ==
=== Origins ===
Muslim historians and jurists theorized that the companion Zubayr ibn al-Awwam was one of the earliest traditionalist and textualist scholars who influenced later Athari scholasticism. Zubair's method of proto-textualism precedently influenced the scholars of Ahl al-Ḥadīth. This was characterized by their approach to literal adherence to the texts of the Quran and ḥadīth, while largely rejecting the Qiyas (analogy) methodology of Ahl al-Ra'y (scholars of logic). This strict view expressed by az-Zubayr regarding the exegetical interpretation of the Quran was recorded in his primary biographies compiled by Islamic scholars. These include the statements of az-Zubayr such as his advice to one of his children to never argue about the text of the Quran with logic. According to az-Zubayr, the interpretations of the Quran should be strictly bound with the traditional understanding of the ḥadīth and sunnah. Such anti-rationalistic, traditionalistic, and ḥadīth-oriented views were also shared by many influential scholars in history that reached the rank of mujtahid mūtlaq (advanced scholars who founded their own madhhab) such as the Shafiʽite scholar Ibn Kathir, Hanbalite scholar Ibn Taymiyyah, Ibn Hazm, al-Bukhari, and also scholars from the Jariri and Zahiri schools.

Another companion who was known to hold this textualist stance was 'Abdullah ibn Umar. When enquired by a group of his Tabi'in disciples regarding his views on the Qadariyah, Ibn 'Umar responded with subtle takfīr (excommunication from Islam) towards the Qadariyah for their rejection of qadar (predestination). He also condemned their usage of analogical method (Qiyas). According to contemporary scholars, the reason for the condemnation of the Qadariyah by Ibn 'Umar was the similarity between their doctrines and those of Zoroastrianism and Manichaeism due to their respective dualistic cosmologies, which are in line with one ḥadīth that recites: "Qadariyah were Magi of this Ummah".

Another notable early Atharist is Amir al-Sha'bi, who unlike his colleague Ibrahim al-Nakha'i, who relied primarily on Qiyas (analogic deduction) in his scholastic method, al-Shaʿbī strongly relied primarily on scriptural traditions (Atharism). He also tried to convince other scholars that Qiyās was not a valid argument. Al-Sha'bi was recorded to have said: "Beware of Qiyās. For when you use it, you make what is halal to be haram and what is haram to be halal."

=== Formation ===
Atharism materialized as a formal distinct school of thought towards the end of the 8th century CE among Muslim scholars of the ḥadīth who held the Quran and the authentic ḥadīth to be the only acceptable sources in matters of law and creed. Alongside Malik ibn Anas, Islamic scholar Ibn Idris al-Shafi'i is widely regarded among the earliest leaders of the Athari school. In the debates between rationalists and the traditionalists, al-Shafi'i was able to successfully uphold the superiority of the ḥadīth over other devices (such as rational arguments, local traditions, customs, ra'y, etc. ) as the source of theological knowledge and Quranic interpretation. From this school would emerge a vigorous traditionalist movement against the Ahl al-Ra'y and its various manifestations. The doctrines of these early Shafi'ite theologians would be revived in the treatises of later Hanbali scholars.

At first these scholars formed minorities within existing religious study circles, but by the early 9th century CE they coalesced into a separate traditionalist scholastic movement, commonly called Ahl al-Ḥadīth, under the leadership of Ahmad ibn Hanbal. (Note: Although the Hanbalis were fervent advocates of Athari creed, the school maintained broad appeal across the Sunni World throughout history: R. Halverson, Jeffry (2010). "2: The Demise of 'Ilm al-Kalam". Theology and Creed in Sunni Islam: The Muslim Brotherhood, Ash'arism, and Political Sunnism. New York, NY: Palgrave Macmillan. pp. 34–35. ISBN 978-0-230-10279-8. "The Atharis are often erroneously subsumed under the Hanbalite school of law.. The Hanbalite madhhab, in contrast, largely maintained the traditionalist or Athari position.. the imaginative, narrative-centered, emotive piety of the Atharis must have retained broad appeal in the Sunni Muslim world, albeit within a range of gradations and accompanied by a good deal of religio-cultural accretions or retentions as well."; Bishara, Azmi (2022). "1: What is Salafism?". On Salafism: concepts and contexts. Stanford, California, USA: Stanford University Press. p. 2. ISBN 9781503630352. LCCN 2021061200. "In the writings of the early generations of Hanbalis in the tenth and eleventh centuries CE, they commonly referred to themselves as Ahl al-Athar (People of Narration). The close association of this term with the Hanbali school meant that the Hanbalis themselves came to be known as Aṣḥāb al-Āthār or Athariyyūn (Narrativists). The Athariyyūn followed the example of al-salaf al-ṣāliḥ (the righteous ancestors), namely the companions of the Prophet and the following generations of ("sincere" or "faithful") successors") Another major leader of the traditionalist camp during this era was Dawud ibn Khalaf, the founder of the Zahirite (literalist) school. Under the leadership of these two scholars, the Atharite camp gained ascendancy. In legal matters, these traditionalists criticized the use of personal opinion (ra'y) common among the Hanafite jurists of Iraq as well as the reliance on living local traditions by Malikite jurists of Medina. They emphasised the superiority of Scriptural proofs, denouncing the role of 'Aql (human intellect) and also rejected methods of jurisprudence not based on literal reading of scriptures. Unlike mainstream traditionalists, Dawud would go as far as to declare all forms of Qiyas (analogical reasoning) to be completely invalid. In matters of faith, traditionalists were pitted against Mu'tazilites and other theological currents, condemning many points of their doctrines as well as the rationalistic methods they used in defending them.

Traditionalists were also characterized by their avoidance of all state patronage and by their social activism. They attempted to follow the injunction of "commanding good and forbidding evil" by preaching asceticism and launching vigilante attacks to break wine bottles, musical instruments and chessboards. In 833, the caliph al-Ma'mun tried to impose Mu'tazilite theology on all religious scholars and instituted an inquisition (mihna) which required them to accept the Mu'tazilite doctrine that the Quran was created and therefore not co-eternal with God, which implicitly made it subject to interpretation by caliphs and scholars. Ibn Hanbal led traditionalist resistance to this policy, affirming under torture that the Quran was uncreated and hence co-eternal with God. Although Mu'tazilism remained state doctrine until 851, the efforts to impose it only served to politicize and harden the theological controversy. The failure of the Mihna campaign symbolised the total defeat of the Mu'tazilites and the doctrinal triumph of the persecuted traditionalists, who had gained popular support. Apart from the universal condemnation of the doctrine of Qur'anic createdness; 'Aql (human intellect) was denied any independent role in religious interpretations and driven compliant to Wahy (Revelation) in Sunni hermeneutical paradigm.

=== Emergence of Kalām ===
The next two centuries saw an emergence of broad compromises in both law and creed within Sunni Islam. In jurisprudence, Hanafi, Maliki, Shafi'i, and Hanbali schools all gradually came to accept both the traditionalist reliance on the Quran and ḥadīth and the use of controlled reasoning in the form of qiyas. In theology, al-Ashʿarī (874–936) found a middle ground between Mu'tazilite rationalism and Hanbalite literalism, using the rationalistic methods championed by Mu'tazilites to defend most tenets of the traditionalist doctrine. A rival compromise between rationalism and traditionalism emerged from the work of al-Māturīdī (d. c. 944), and one of these two schools of theology was accepted by members of all the Sunni schools of jurisprudence, with the exception of most Hanbalite and some Maliki and Shafi'i scholars, who ostensibly persisted in their rejection of kalām, although they often resorted to rationalistic arguments themselves, even while claiming to rely on the literal text of the Islamic scriptures.

=== Traditionalist response ===
Although the traditionalist scholars who rejected the Ashʿarī-Māturīdī synthesis were in the minority, their emotive, narrative-based approach to faith remained influential among the urban masses in some areas, particularly in Abbasid Baghdad. Its popularity manifested itself repeatedly from the late 9th to 11th centuries, when crowds shouted down preachers who publicly expounded rationalistic theology. After the caliph al-Mutawakkil suspended the rationalist inquisition, Abbasid caliphs came to rely on an alliance with traditionalists to buttress popular support. In the early 11th century, the caliph al-Qadir made a series of proclamations that sought to prevent public preaching of rationalistic theology. In turn, the Seljuq vizier Nizam al-Mulk in the late 11th century encouraged Ashʿarite theologians in order to counterbalance caliphal traditionalism, inviting a number of them to preach in Baghdad over the years. One such occasion led to five months of rioting in the city in 1077.

=== Modern and contemporary era ===
While Ashʿarism and Māturīdism are often called the Sunni "orthodoxy", Athari theology has thrived alongside it, laying rival claims to be the orthodox Sunni faith. In the modern era it has had a disproportionate impact on Islamic theology, having been appropriated by Wahhabi and other traditionalist Salafi currents and spread well beyond the confines of the Hanbali school of jurisprudence. The works of 19th century Sunni Yemeni theologian Muhammad Al-Shawkani (d. 1839 C.E/ 1255 A.H) has contributed heavily to the revival of traditionalist theology in the contemporary era.

Traditionalist scripturalism also exerts significant influence within the Hanafi school of jurisprudence, such as the Hanafite scholar Ibn Abi al-Izz's sharh (commentary) on al-Tahawi's creedal treatise Al-Aqida al-Tahawiyya. This treatise would become popular amongst the adherents of the later Salafiyya movement, who regard it as a true representation of the Hanafi creed free from the influence of Māturīdī theology. Numerous contemporary Salafi scholars have produced supercommentaries and annotations on the sharh, including Abd al-Aziz ibn Baz, Muhammad Nasiruddin al-Albani, and Saleh al-Fawzan, and it is taught as a standard text at the Islamic University of Madinah.

== Beliefs ==
Athari doctrine is grounded on the following propositions:

- Strict compliance to the sources of Islamic law; i.e., Qur'an, Sunnah and 'Ijma (scholarly consensus)
- Uniformity of foundational creedal principles extracted from these sources
- Deference to qualified scholars of hadith capable of deriving rulings from hadith
- Strong hostility towards various forms of bid'ah (religious innovations)

=== On Taqlid ===
The traditionalists' attitudes towards religious principles led them to differentiate two similar terms: Taqlid and Ittiba. Taqlid which was the practice of blindly following scholars and their opinions (ra'y) without scriptural proofs, was harshly condemned. On the other hand, Atharis understood Ittiba as following the prophetic teachings by using the scriptural evidences supplied by the scholars. Many traditionalists like Ahmad ibn Hanbal (d. 855), a major scholar who articulated Ijtihad and rejected Taqlid, would use scriptural proofs from the Quran and sunnah but also in some cases rational proofs.

The Athari denunciations of Taqlid would reach its zenith in the writings of the 8th/14th-century theologians Ibn Taymiyya (d. 1328 C.E/ 728 A.H) and Ibn Qayyim al-Jawziyya (d. 1350 C.E/751 A.H). According to Ibn Taymiyya, those who depart from the clear texts of Qur'an and Hadith to prefer the opinions of other individuals belong to the "Age of Ignorance" (Jahiliyyah) and deserve to be punished. In one of his fatwas sternly condemning the practice of blind Taqlid, Ibn Taymiyya declares:

One who requires taqlīd of a particular imām must be asked to repent, and if he refuses, he is to be killed.

=== On reason ===
While they promoted strict adherence to the Quran, the ḥadīth, the sunnah, and ijma, and consensus Atharis did not neglect the use of reason. According to the traditionalists, rational arguments serve as proofs of the divine revelation. Despite the traditionalist criticism of the rationalist Islamic theologians, reason plays an important role in Athari theology.

According to the medieval Sunni theologian and Hanbalite scholar Ibn Taymiyyah (d. 1328), straying away from tradition and adopting rationalist approaches creates disputes among Muslims. Hence, Ibn Taymiyyah advocated the doctrine of early Athari theologians, which emphasizes the stability of the tradition. Summing up the traditionalist attitude toward rational argumentation, Ibn Taymiyyah wrote:

The preference of rational arguments over traditional ones is impossible and unsound. As for the preference of the traditional proofs, it is possible and sound... that is on account of the fact that being known through reason or not is not an inherent attribute (ṣifa lāzima) of a thing but rather a relative one (min al-umūr al-nisbiyya al-iḍāfiyya), for Zayd may know through his reason what Bakr does not know, and a man may know at a certain time through his reason what he will not know at another time.

=== On Quran ===
Athari theologians believe that every part of the Quran is uncreated (ghair makhluq). It is reported that Ahmad ibn Hanbal (d. 855) said: "The Qur'an is God's Speech, which He expressed; it is uncreated. He who claims the opposite is a Jahmite, an infidel. And he who says, 'The Qur'an is God's Speech,' and stops there without adding 'uncreated,' speaks even more abominably than the former."

=== On kalām ===
For Atharis, the validity of human reason is limited, and rational proofs cannot be trusted or relied upon in matters of belief, which makes kalām a blameworthy innovation. Rational proofs, unless they are Qur'anic in origin, are considered nonexistent and wholly invalid. However, that was not always the case since a number of Atharis delved into kalām, whether or not they described it as such.

Examples of Atharis who wrote books against the use of kalām and human reason include the Hanbalite Sufi scholar Khwaja Abdullah Ansari and the Hanbalite jurist Ibn Qudama. Ibn Qudama harshly rebuked kalām as one of the worst of all heresies. He characterized its theologians, the mutakallimūn, as innovators and heretics who had betrayed and deviated from the simple and pious faith of the early Muslims. He wrote, "The theologians are intensely hated in this world, and they will be tortured in the next. None among them will prosper, nor will he succeed in following the right direction..."

=== On attributes of God ===
Atharis staunchly affirm the existence of the attributes of God and consider all of them to be equally eternal. They accept the relevant verses of the Quran and the ḥadīth as they are without subjecting them to rational analysis or elaboration. According to Atharis, the real meanings of the attributes of God should be consigned to God alone (tafwid). According to this method, one should adhere to the text of the Quran and believe that it is the truth, without trying to explain it through a figurative explanation.

Ahmad ibn Hanbal reportedly stated: "His Attributes proceed from Him and are His own, we do not go beyond the Qur'an and the traditions of the Prophet and his Companions; nor do we know the how of these, save by the acknowledgment of the Apostle and the confirmation of the Qur'an."

Ibn Qudamah al-Maqdisi stated: "For we have no need to know the meaning which Allah intended by His attributes; no course of action is intended by them, nor is there any obligation attached to them. It is possible to believe in them without the knowledge of their intended sense."

Anthropomorphism was commonly alleged against Athari theologians by their critics, including the Hanbalite scholar and theologian Ibn al-Jawzi. In some cases, Athari scholars espoused extreme anthropomorphic views, but they do not generally represent the Athari theology as a whole.

=== On iman (faith) ===
The Atharis hold that iman (faith) increases and decreases in correlation with the performance of prescribed rituals and duties, such as the five daily prayers. They believe that iman resides in the heart, in the utterance of the tongue, and in the action of the limbs.

=== Categorisation of tawhid ===
Ibn Taymiyyah seems to have been the first to introduce this distinction.

Not all adherents of the Athari school support the splitting of Tawhid into three parts, as done by Muhammad ibn Abd al-Wahhab and thus believe it is an innovation.

== Criticism ==
The 16th-century Ash'arite scholar Ibn Hajar al-Haytami denounced Athari theological views as associated with the doctrine of Ibn Taymiyyah.

== See also ==
- List of Atharis

== Sources ==
- Ali Shah, Zulfiqar (2012). Anthropomorphic Depictions of God: The Concept of God in Judaic, Christian, and Islamic Traditions: Representing the Unrepresentable. International Institute of Islamic Thought (IIIT). ISBN 978-1565645752.
- Alwani, Taha Jabir Fayyad; DeLorenzo, Yusuf Talal; Al-Shikh-Ali, A. S. (2003). Source Methodology in Islamic Jurisprudence Uṣūl Al Figh Al Islāmī. International Institute of Islamic Thought. ISBN 978-1-56564-404-5.
- Al-Dhahabi (1996). al-Arna'ut, Shu'ayb (ed.). Siyar aʿlām an-nubalāʾ (in Arabic). Beirut: Muʾassasat ar-Risāla.
- Abrahamov, Binyamin (1996). Anthropomorphism and Interpretation of the Qur'an in the Theology of Al-Qasim Ibn Ibrahim: Kitab Al-Mustarshid. Leiden: E.J. Brill. ISBN 9004104089.
- Agwan, A. R.; Singh, N. K. (2000). Encyclopedia of the Holy Qur'an. Global Vision Publishing House. ISBN 8187746009.
- Belo, Catarina (2014). "Theology". In Ibrahim Kalin (ed.). The Oxford Encyclopedia of Philosophy, Science, and Technology in Islam. Oxford: Oxford University Press. ISBN 978-0-19-981257-8.
- Berkey, Jonathan Porter (2003). The Formation of Islam: Religion and Society in the Near East, 600-1800 (Kindle ed.). Cambridge University Press.
- Berkey, Jonathan Porter (2010). "Islam". In Robert Irwin (ed.). The New Cambridge History of Islam. Vol. 4: Islamic Cultures and Societies to the End of the Eighteenth Century. Cambridge University Press.
- Blankinship, Khalid (2008). Tim Winter (ed.). The early creed. Vol. The Cambridge Companion to Classical Islamic Theology (Kindle ed.). Cambridge University Press.
- Brown, Jonathan A.C. (2009). Hadith: Muhammad's Legacy in the Medieval and Modern World (Kindle ed.). Oneworld Publications.
- Brown, Jonathan A.C. (2009b). "Salafism". Oxford Bibliographies. Oxford: Oxford University Press.
- Burrell, David B.; Cogliati, Carlo; Soskice, Janet M.; Stoeger, William R., eds. (2010). Creation and the God of Abraham. Cambridge University Press. ISBN 9781139490788.
- Campo, Juan Eduardo (2009). Encyclopedia of Islam. Infobase Publishing. ISBN 978-1-4381-2696-8.
- El Omari, Racha (2013). "Theology". In Gerhard Böwering, Patricia Crone (ed.). The Princeton Encyclopedia of Islamic Political Thought. Princeton University Press.
- El Shamsy, Ahmed (2008). Tim Winter (ed.). The social construction of orthodoxy. Vol. The Cambridge Companion to Classical Islamic Theology (Kindle ed.). Cambridge University Press.
- Esposito, John L., ed. (2014). "Ahl al-Hadith". The Oxford Dictionary of Islam. Oxford: Oxford University Press. ISBN 978-0-19-512558-0.
- Halverson, Jeffry R. (2010). Theology and Creed in Sunni Islam: The Muslim Brotherhood, Ash'arism, and Political Sunnism. Palgrave Macmillan. ISBN 9781137473578.
- Hodgson, Marshall G. S. (2009). The Venture of Islam, Volume 1: The Classical Age of Islam (Kindle ed.). University of Chicago Press.
- Hoover, Jon (April 2014). "Ḥanbalī Theology". In Sabine Schmidtke (ed.). The Oxford Handbook of Islamic Theology. Oxford: Oxford University Press. doi:10.1093/oxfordhb/9780199696703.013.014. ISBN 9780199696703.
- Ibrahim, Hassan Ahmed (2006). "Shaykh Muḥammad Ibn ʿAbd Al-Wahhāb and Shāh Walī Allāh: A Preliminary Comparison of Some Aspects of Their Lifes and Careers". Asian Journal of Social Science. 34 (1): 103–119. doi:10.1163/156853106776150126. JSTOR 23654402.
- Isaacs, Rico; Frigerio, Alessandro (2018). Theorizing Central Asian Politics: The State, Ideology and Power. Springer. ISBN 9783319973555.
- Laoust, Henri (1986). "Hanabila". In P. Bearman; Th. Bianquis; C.E. Bosworth; E. van Donzel; W.P. Heinrichs (eds.). Encyclopaedia of Islam. Vol. 3 (Second ed.). Brill.
- Lapidus, Ira M. (2014). A History of Islamic Societies (Kindle ed.). Cambridge University Press. ISBN 978-0-521-51430-9.
- Lauzière, Henri (2015). The Making of Salafism: Islamic Reform in the Twentieth Century. Columbia University Press. ISBN 9780231540179.
- Leaman, Oliver (2008). Tim Winter (ed.). The developed kalām tradition. Vol. The Cambridge Companion to Classical Islamic Theology (Kindle ed.). Cambridge University Press.
- Leaman, Oliver (2009). "Ahl al-Ḥadīth". In John L. Esposito (ed.). The Oxford Encyclopedia of the Islamic World. Oxford: Oxford University Press. ISBN 978-0-19-530513-5.
- Lucas, Scott C. (2005). "Theology". In Josef W. Meri (ed.). Medieval Islamic Civilization: An Encyclopedia. Routledge.
- Lucas, Scott C. (2006). "The Legal Principles of Muhammad B. Ismāʿīl Al-Bukhārī and Their Relationship to Classical Salafi Islam". Islamic Law and Society. 13 (3): 290–292, 303. doi:10.1163/156851906778946341.
- Mason, Herbert W. (1973). Herbert W. Mason; Ronald L. Nettler; Jacques Waardenburg (eds.). Humaniora Islamica. Vol. 1. Mouton. ISBN 9782719306079.
- Melchert, Christopher (2006). Ahmad Ibn Hanbal. Oneworld Publ.
- Shahin, Emad el-Din (2009). "Salafīyah". In John L. Esposito (ed.). The Oxford Encyclopedia of the Islamic World. Oxford: Oxford University Press. ISBN 978-0-19-530513-5.
- Spevack, Aaron (2014). The Archetypal Sunni Scholar: Law, Theology, and Mysticism in the Synthesis of al-Bajuri. SUNY Press. ISBN 978-1-4384-5371-2.
- Spevack, Aaron (2016). "Egypt and the Later Ashʿarite School". In Sabine Schmidtke (ed.). The Oxford Handbook of Islamic Theology. Oxford University Press. pp. 534–546. ISBN 9780199696703.
- Stewart, Devin (2002). "Muḥammad b. Dāwūd al-Ẓāhirī's Manual of Jurisprudence: Al-Wuṣūl ilā maʿrifat al-uṣūl". Studies in Islamic Legal Theory. 15: 99–158. doi:10.1163/9789047400851_009. ISBN 9789047400851.
- Taufiq, Muhammad (2019). Filsafat Hukum Islam dari teori dan implementasi. Duta Media Publishing. ISBN 9786237161479.
- Waines, David (2003). An Introduction to Islam. Cambridge University Press. ISBN 0521539064.
