= Kharaj =

Type of Islamic tax

Kharāj (Arabic: خراج; IPA: [xa.raːd͡ʒ]) is a type of individual Islamic tax on agricultural land and its produce, regardless of the religion of the owners, developed under Islamic law.

With the first Muslim conquests in the 7th century, the kharaj initially was synonymous with jizyah and denoted a lump-sum duty levied upon the lands of conquered provinces, which was collected by hold-over officials of the defeated Byzantine Empire in the west and the Sassanid Empire in the east; later and more broadly, kharaj refers to a land-tax levied by Muslim rulers on their non-Muslim subjects, collectively known as dhimmi. Muslim landowners, on the other hand, paid ushr, a religious tithe on land, which carried a lower rate of taxation, and zakat. Ushr was a reciprocal 10% levy on agricultural land as well as merchandise imported from states that taxed Muslims on their products.

Changes soon eroded the established tax base of the early Arab Caliphates. Additionally, a large, but unsuccessful, expedition against the Byzantine Empire undertaken by the Umayyad caliph Sulayman in 717 brought the finances of the Umayyads to the brink of collapse. Even before Sulayman's ascent to power, the powerful governor of Iraq, al-Hajjaj ibn Yusuf, attempted to raise revenues by demanding from Muslims a full rate of taxation, but that measure met with opposition and resentment. To address these problems, Sulayman's successor Umar II worked out a compromise in which, beginning from 719, land from which kharaj was paid could not be transferred to Muslims; instead, they could lease such land, but in that case they would be required to pay kharaj from it. With the passage of time, the practical result of that reform was that kharaj was levied on most land without regard for the cultivator's religion. The reforms of Umar II were finalized under the Abbasids and would thereafter form the model of tax systems in the Islamic state. From that time on, kharaj was also used as a general term describing all kinds of taxes: for example, the classic treatise on taxation by the 9th century jurist Abu Yusuf was called Kitab al-Kharaj, i.e. The Book On Taxation. The content of Yusef’s writings outlined the framework that governments should follow in order to enact fiscal policy in accordance with traditional Islamic teachings. It helped influence economists going forward on how to analyze economic policies through an Islamic Lens. Yusef’s guidelines for tax policies are still studied by modern economists and Islamic finance professionals as instruction for how to operate a business or view financial practices in accordance with the Qur’an. The Kitab al-Kharaj also serves as a solid basis for both Muslims and non-Muslims to learn more about what it means to follow economic practices in accordance with the teachings of Islam.

20th-century Russian orientalist, A. Yu. Yakubovski, compares the land tax system of Persian Sassanids with that of the post-Islamic Caliphate era:

A comparison between pre-Islamic documents and those of the Islamic period reveals that conquering Arabs increased the land taxation without exception. Thus, raising taxes of each acre of wheat field to four dirhams and each acre of barley field to two dirhams, whereas during reign of Khosro Anushiravan it used to be a single dirham for each acre of wheat or barley field. During the later stage of the Umayyad Caliphate, landowners were paying from one fourth to one third of their land produce to the state as kharaj.

In the Ottoman Empire, kharaj evolved into haraç, a form of poll tax on non-Muslim subjects. It was superseded by cizye.
