= Ibn Abi Layla =

Early Muslim jurist and qadi of Kufa

- بن أبي ليلى

Qadi of Kufa
- In office c. 733–765
- Succeeded by: Abd Allah ibn Isa ibn Abd al-Rahman ibn Abi Layla

Personal life
- Born: 693 Umayyad Caliphate
- Died: 765 (aged 72) Abbasid Caliphate
- Parent: Abd al-Rahman ibn Abi Layla

Religious life
- Religion: Islam

Senior posting
- Teacher: Ata ibn Abi Rabah, Amir al-Sha'bi

Muhammad ibn Abd al-Rahman ibn Abi Layla (Arabic: محمد بن عبد الرحمن بن أبي ليلى, romanized: Muḥammad b. ʿAbd al-Raḥmān b. Abī Laylā; 693 – 765), also known as Ibn Abi Layla, was an early Muslim jurist who served as the qadi (judge) of Kufa from c. 733 until his death. Considered to be one of the leading figures of the ahl al-ra'y, he was a contemporary of fellow Kufan jurist Abu Hanifa, the eponym of the Hanafi school of law.

== Biography ==
Ibn Abi Layla was born in 693 to a scholarly family. His father, Abd al-Rahman, who died when Ibn Abi Layla was young, was a prominent Kufan tabi'i who fought alongside Ali at the Battle of the Camel and participated in the revolt of Ibn al-Ash'ath; his grandfather, Abu Layla, was a companion of Muhammad. Ibn Abi Layla's principal teachers of fiqh were al-Sha'bi and al-Hakam ibn Utayba, and for some time he audited the lectures of Ata ibn Abi Rabah. He was appointed as the qadi of Kufa by the Umayyads, although exactly when is uncertain; 733 and 741 have been suggested as possible years. His students included al-Kisa'i, Waki' ibn al-Jarrah and Sufyan ibn ʽUyaynah. He died in 765 and was succeeded by his nephew, Abd Allah ibn Isa ibn Abd al-Rahman, as qadi. Adherents to his doctrine still existed as late as the time of al-Shafi'i.

According to Hanafi sources, Abu Hanifa and Ibn Abi Layla would hold public debates, and the former would criticise the latter during his lessons. The Hanafi jurist Abu Yusuf originally attended the study circles of Ibn Abi Layla before leaving to join those of Abu Hanifa. The legal treatise Ikhtilāf Abī Ḥanīfa wa-Ibn Abī Laylā, which can be reasonably attributed to Abu Yusuf, details 263 points of law on which Abu Hanifa and Ibn Abi Layla disagreed. In the treatise, Ibn Abi Layla rarely adduces hadith or the opinions of Muhammad's companions to argue a case, instead largely relying on his own ra'y.

== See also ==
- Ikhtilaf Abi Hanifa wa Ibn Abi Layla
