= Ahl al-Hadith =

8th-century Islamic school of thought

Ahl al-Hadith (Arabic: أَهْل الحَدِيث, romanized: Ahl al-Ḥadīth, lit. 'people of hadith') is an Islamic school of Sunni Islam that emerged during the 2nd and 3rd Islamic centuries of the Islamic era (late 8th and 9th century CE) as a movement of hadith scholars who considered the Quran and authentic hadith to be the only authority in matters of law and creed. They were known as "Athari" for championing traditionalist theological doctrines which rejected rationalist approaches and advocated a strictly literalist reading of Scriptures. Its adherents have also been referred to as traditionalists and sometimes traditionists (from "traditions", namely, hadiths). The traditionalists constituted the most authoritative and dominant bloc of Sunni orthodoxy prior to the emergence of mad'habs (legal schools) during the fourth Islamic century.

In jurisprudence, Ahl al-Hadith opposed many of their contemporary jurists who based their legal reasoning on informed opinion رَأْي (raʼy) or living local practice عُرْف (ʽurf), who were referred to, often derogatorily, as Ahl ar-Ra'y. The traditionalists condemned the practice of taqlid (following scholarly opinions or ra'y without asking for scriptural proofs) and advocated ittiba (adherence to scholarly traditions by asking for proofs from the Quran and Sunnah and taking only their literal meaning). In turn, the Ahl al-Hadith upheld ijtihad (scholarly legal reasoning) by adhering to Scriptures.

In matters of faith, Ahl al-Hadith were pitted against the Mu'tazilites and other theological currents, condemning many points of their doctrines as well as the excessive rationalistic methods Mu'tazilites used in defending and justifying themselves. The most prominent leader of the movement was ʼAḥmad Ibn Ḥanbal. Subsequently, other Islamic legal schools gradually came to accept the reliance on the Quran and hadith advocated by the Ahl al-Hadith movement as valid, while al-Ash'ari (874-936) used rationalistic argumentation favored by Mu'tazilites to defend most of the same tenets of the Ahl al-Hadith doctrine, carrying on the legacy provided by Ibn Kullab. In the following centuries, the term ahl al-hadith came to refer to those scholars of the Hanbali and Zahiri schools; who rejected rationalistic theology (kalam) and held on to the creed of Ahmad Ibn Hanbal and especially Imam Zahiri. This theological school, which is also known as traditionalist theology, has been championed in recent times by the Salafi movement. The term ahl al-hadith is sometimes used in a more general sense to denote a particularly enthusiastic commitment to hadith and to the views and way of life of the Muhammad's contemporaries and the early generations of believers.

== Terminology ==
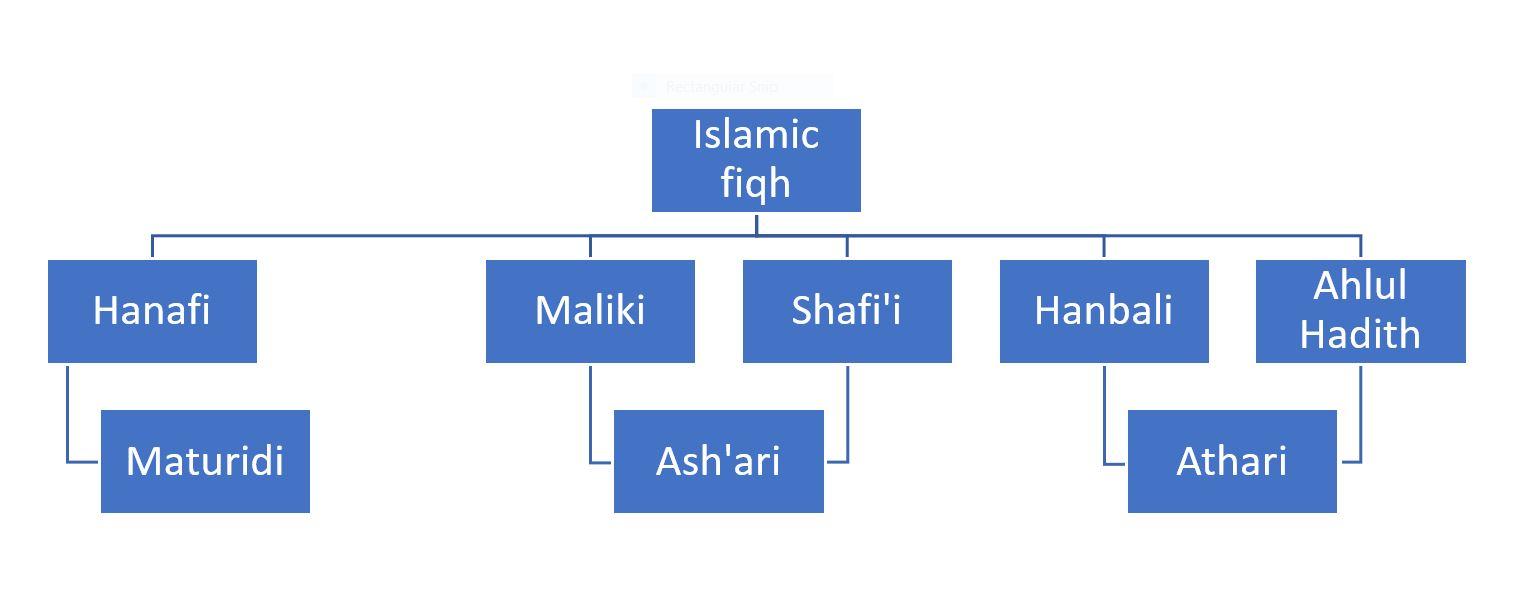
Islamic schools of Jurisprudence

Ahl al-Ḥadith (or Așḥāb al-Ḥadiṯh (Arabic: أَصْحَاب الحَدِيث, lit. 'The adherents of the tradition') or the ʼAṯariyyūn (Arabic: أَثَرِيُّون, lit. 'The Traditionalists')) were often approvingly termed Ahl al-Sunnah (Arabic: أَهْل السُّنَّة, lit. 'The people of [Prophetic] traditions'), referring to their claim of representing orthodox (that is, entirely tradition-based) Sunni Islam, while they were known pejoratively as al-Ḥashwiyya (Arabic: الحَشْوِيَّة, lit. 'The verbose'), referring to the overabundance of narratives and traditions in their works and compilations. In theological polemics, they were often included under the label al-Mujassimūn (Arabic: المُجَسِّمُون, lit. 'The anthropomorphists'), referring to how their depictions of the Islamic God were received by their ideological rivals, especially the Mu'tazilites, who asserted the absolute incorporeality of God in Islam.

== History ==
Muslim historians and jurists theorized that a Sahabi (Companion of the Prophet) named Zubayr ibn al-Awwam was one of the earliest traditionalist, and textualist scholar who influenced later era Athari scholars. Scholarship of jurisprudential history highlighted that Zubair's methodology of proto-textualism had greatly impacted the scholars of Ahl al-Hadith who were characterized by their approach to hold a strictly textualist understanding of Quran and Hadith, while mostly rejecting the Qiyas (analogy) method of Ahl al-Ra'y (scholars of Logic). Zubayr's strict views on exegetical field of Qur'anic interpretation were recorded in his primary biographies preserved by contemporary Muslim scholars, such as the saying of az-Zubayr when he advised one of his children to never argue about the Qur'anic texts with logic. The interpretation of Qur'an, according to az-Zubayr, should be strictly bound with understanding the tradition of Hadith and Sunnah.

Such anti-rationalist, traditionalist and hadith oriented views were also shared by many influential scholars throughout history, many of whom reached the rank of absolute Mujtahid (scholars who allowed to open their own Madhhab due to their knowledge vastness) such as the Shafiite Ibn Kathir, Hanbalite Ibn Taymiyyah, Ibn Hazm, Bukhari independent Madhhab, and also scholars from Jariri, and Zahiri Maddhabs.

Another companion of the prophet who was known to hold this textualist stance was Abdullah ibn Umar. When asked by a group of his Tabi'in disciples regarding his views on the Qadariyah sect, Ibn 'Umar responded with takfir (excommunication from Islam) on the Qadariyah group for their reasoning to reject qadar. Ibn 'Umar further condemned those Qadariyah and warned his disciples from their analogical methodology. According to contemporary scholars, the reason of Ibn Umar condemned the Qadariyya was because they were similar to Zoroastrianism and Manichaeism due to their dualism philosophy, which aligned with Hadiths (Prophetic traditions) that stated "Qadariyah were Magi of this Ummah".

The Ahl al-Hadith movement emerged toward the end of the 8th century CE among scholars of hadith who held the Qur'an and authentic hadith to be the only acceptable sources of law and creed. At first these scholars formed minorities within existing religious study circles but by the early 9th century had coalesced into a separate movement under the leadership of Ahmad ibn Hanbal. In legal matters, these scholars criticized the use of personal scholarly opinion (ra'y) common among the Hanafi jurists of Iraq as well as the reliance on living local traditions by Malikite jurists of Medina. They also rejected the use of qiyas (analogical deduction) and other methods of jurisprudence such Hiyal (legal deductions) when it gave precedence to Ra'y (individual opinion) over Hadith and was not based on literal reading of scripture. Ahl al-Hadith strongly opposed the practice of Taqlid, which depended on the opinions of past Imams. They prescribed Ijtihad, which relied on the usage of hadiths. The scholars of the Ahl al-Hadith did not standardise themselves into an official mad'hab (legal school) and held diverse juristic approaches.

In matters of faith, they were pitted against Mu'tazilites and other theological currents, condemning many points of their doctrines as well as the rationalistic methods they used in defending them. Ahl al-Hadith were also characterized by their avoidance of all state patronage and by their social activism. They attempted to follow the injunction of "commanding good and forbidding evil" by preaching absolute asceticism and at times even launching vigilante attacks to break wine bottles, musical instruments, and chessboards.

=== Convergence of legal schools ===
The next two centuries witnessed a broad convergence of legal methodologies which gave rise to the classical theories of Sunni jurisprudence (uṣūl al-fiqh), which, despite long disputes, share formal similarities. Hanafi and Maliki jurists gradually came to accept the primacy of the Quran and hadith advocated by the Ahl al-Hadith movement, restricting the use of other forms of legal reasoning to interpretation of these scriptures. This "traditionalizing" of legal reasoning is exemplified in the work of Malik's student Al-Shafi'i, which laid the foundation of the Shafi'i legal school. In turn, Hanbali jurists, who led the traditionalist movement and initially opposed the use of qiyas, gradually came to accept it as long as its application was strictly founded on scriptural sources.

During the 14th century, the Ahl al-Hadith school underwent a religious renewal and crystallisation through the polemics and scholarly treatises of the medieval Hanbali polymath and proto-Salafist theologian Ahmad ibn Taymiyyah.

== Creed ==
The self-understanding of traditionalists is, that their basic views and doctrines can be traced back to the teachings of the Islamic prophet before what they saw as the unacceptable blending of Islamic orthodoxy with the opinions of men رَأْي (raʼy) and the customs of peoples, leading to heterodoxy, or heresy. They condemned the synthesis of "philosophies" (that is, un-Islamic ideas) with the doctrines of the religion as taught by the Islamic prophet and elucidated by his companions, and thus they called for the subordination of all religious disputes to the literal interpretation of the Islamic Scriptures and the prophetic traditions, while also valuing reports of the opinions of earlier generations of believers over later jurists and judges, as the earlier Muslims were held to be professors of orthodoxy. Many of them, including Ahmad ibn Hanbal, the eponymous founder of the Hanbali school of law, nonetheless did not hesitate to reject and criticize the reported opinions and actions of the Islamic prophet's contemporaries, such as Abu Umamah al Bahili's reported greeting of Christians, when they were deemed to be clashing with orthodoxy. The attribution of orthodoxy and non-orthodoxy to figures, however, varies greatly between different religious polemics, especially with regard to the Hanafi school and its eponymous originator, Abu Hanifa. Although Ahmad ibn Hanbal's son, Abdullah, ascribed to his father the condemnation of Abu Hanifa multiple times in his compendium Kitāb al-Sunnah, a number of medieval and modern traditionalists consider the eponyms of the four major and one minor Sunni schools of Islamic law (Abu Hanifa, Malik ibn Anas, Al-Shafiʽi, Zahiri and Ahmad ibn Hanbal) to have all been adherents of "Ahl al-Hadith".

Scholars of the Ahl al-Hadith strongly condemned the doctrines of Kalam (speculative theology) and its various schools such as Ash'arism and Mu'tazilism; accusing them of deviating from the Qur'an and Hadith. They believed that Tawhid (Islamic monotheism) is to be understood strictly on the basis of Qur'an and Hadith, shunning Kalam and affirming the Scriptures Bila Kayfa, "without asking how". Ahl al-Hadith held that the zahir (literal; apparent) meaning of the Qur'an and the hadith have sole authority in matters of faith and that the use of rational disputation is forbidden even if it verifies the truth. They did not attempt to conceptualize the meanings of the Qur'an rationally, especially those related to the attributes of Allah, accepting them without asking "how" (bi-la kaifa), and asserted that their realities should be consigned to God alone (tafwid).

They believed that every part of the Qur'an, including its Arabic letters, are uncreated (ghayr makhluq); since they held the Speech of God to be an Eternal Divine Attribute. Ahl al-Hadith also held that iman (faith) increases and decreases in correlation with the performance of prescribed rituals and duties, such as the five daily prayers.

=== Theological controversies ===
In 833 the caliph al-Ma'mun tried to impose Mu'tazilite theology on all religious scholars and instituted an inquisition (mihna) which required them to accept the Mu'tazilite doctrine that the Qur'an was a created object, which implicitly made it subject to interpretation by caliphs and scholars. Ibn Hanbal led traditionalist resistance to this policy, affirming under torture that the Quran was uncreated and hence coeternal with God. Although Mu'tazilism remained state doctrine until 851, the efforts to impose it only served to politicize and harden the theological controversy. This controversy persisted until Abu al-Hasan al-Ash'ari (874-936) found a middle ground between Mu'tazilite rationalism and Hanbalite literalism, using the rationalistic methods championed by Mu'tazilites to defend most tenets of the Ahl al-Hadith doctrine.

A rival compromise between rationalism and traditionalism emerged from the work of al-Maturidi (d. c. 944), and one of these two schools of theology was accepted by members of all Sunni madhhabs, with the exception of most Hanbalite and some Shafi'i scholars, who persisted in their rejection of kalam, although they often resorted to rationalistic arguments themselves, even while claiming to rely on the literal text of scripture. Although the scholars who rejected the Ash'ari and Maturidi synthesis were in the minority, their emotive, narrative-based approach to faith remained influential among the urban masses in some areas, particularly in Abbasid Baghdad.

=== Contemporary Era ===
While Ash'arism and Maturidism are generally called the Sunni "orthodoxy", the traditionalist school has thrived alongside it, laying rival claims to be the orthodox Sunni creed. In the modern era it has had a disproportionate impact on Islamic theology, having been advocated by Wahhabi and other Salafi currents and spread beyond the confines of the Hanbali school of law. The classical theologian Taqi al-Din Ibn Taymiyya (d. 1328 C.E/ 728 A.H), played the most influential role in formalising the creedal and doctrinal positions of Ahl al-Hadith through his numerous treatises. Ibn Taymiyya became the most important classical scholar for adherents of the Salafiyya movement and his theological treatises are the primary classical scholarly references taught in Salafi seminaries.
