= Ibn al-Athir =

Islamic historian and geographer (1160–1232/3)

Izz ad-Dīn Abū al-Hasan Ibn al-Athīr
- علي عز الدین بن الاثیر الجزري
- Title: Al-Hafiz; Izz ad-Din

Personal life
- Born: May 12, 1160 CE, Jazirat Ibn Umar, present-day Cizre, Seljuk Empire
- Died: 630 AH (1232/1233 CE), Mosul, Ayyubid dynasty
- Era: Islamic golden age
- Main interest(s): Hadith, History
- Notable work(s): The Complete History and The Lions of the Forest and the knowledge about the Companions

Religious life
- Religion: Islam
- Denomination: Sunni
- Jurisprudence: Shafi'i
- Creed: Ash'ari

Muslim leader
- Influenced by: Al-Shafi'i Abu Hasan al-Ash'ari Ibn Asakir
- Influenced: Abu'l-Fida

Abū al-Ḥasan ʿAlī ibn Muḥammad ibn Muḥammad ash-Shaybānī, better known as ʿAlī ʿIzz ad-Dīn Ibn al-Athīr al-Jazarī (Arabic: علي عز الدین بن الاثیر الجزري; 1160–1233) was a Hadith expert, historian, and biographer of Arab descent who wrote in Arabic and was from the Ibn Athir family. At the age of 21, he settled with his father in Mosul to continue his studies, devoting himself to the study of history and Islamic tradition.

== Biography ==
Ibn al-Athir belonged to the Shayban lineage of the large and influential Arab tribe Banu Bakr, which lived across upper Mesopotamia and gave its name to the city of Diyar Bakr. He is also described to have been of Kurdish origin.

In the analysis of Sharafnama , historian Naji Ma'ruf notes that its author, Emir Sharaf Khan Bidlisi, explicitly identified a number of scholars and families of Arab origin, stating their lineage without ambiguity. However, in the Arabic translation of the work, these same individuals are often presented in a way that may lead readers to assume they were Kurds, despite the original text confirming their Arab heritage. According to Ma'ruf, Arabs constitute more than half of the figures mentioned in Sharafnama, even though the work primarily concerns the history of Kurdish states and emirates. As an example, Ma'ruf cites the historian Ibn al-Athir al-Jazari and his brothers Diyā' ad-Dīn Ibn Athir and Majd ad-Dīn Ibn Athir, who, according to all major Arabic biographical sources, were Arabs of the Banu Shayban tribe. In the translator’s footnotes to the Arabic edition, Ibn al-Athir is described as Kurdish, a claim that is unfounded and contrary to Sharaf Khan's own statements.

As above mentioned, Ibn al-Athir was the brother of Majd ad-Dīn Ibn Athir and Diyā' ad-Dīn Ibn Athir. al-Athir lived a scholarly life in Mosul, often visited Baghdad, and for a time traveled with Saladin's army in Syria. He later lived in Aleppo and Damascus. His chief work was a history of the world, al-Kamil fi at-Tarikh (The Complete History).

== Death ==
Ibn al-Athir died in 1232/1233 and was buried in a cemetery in Mosul, at the district of Bab Sinjar. His tomb was built in the 20th century and was located in the middle of a road, after the cemetery was cleared for modernization. It became a site of an erroneous legend, which identified it as a tomb of a female mystic. However, the government later installed a marble stele to indicate that it was Ibn al-Athir's tomb. His tomb was also regarded in local Yazidi folklore as being the grave of a girl who married the Emir of Mosul but died of poisoning.

The tomb of Ibn al-Athir was bulldozed by members of Islamic State of Iraq and the Levant in June of 2014.

== Works ==
- Al-Kāmil fī al-tārīkh (الكامل في التاريخ): "The Complete History"; 11 volumes
- al-Usd al-ghābah fi ma‘rifat al-ṣaḥābah: "The Lions of the Forest and the knowledge about the Companions"
- Al-Qawl al-Jamil fi 'Ilm al-Jarh wa at-Ta'dil
- Al-Tārīkh al-bāhir fī al-Dawlah al-Atābakīyah bi-al-Mawṣil
- Al-Lubāb fī tahdhīb al-ansāb

== See also ==
- List of Kurdish scholars
- List of Muslim historians
- List of Islamic scholars
- List of Ash'aris and Maturidis
- Varangian
