= Asian Sunnis =

Asian Sunnis may refer to:

- Ahl al-Hadith
- Barelwi
- Deobandi
