= Muhammad Rawas Qal'aji =

Syrian writer, Hanafi Salafi jurist

- محمد رواس قلعه جي
- Born: Muhammad Rawas Qal'aji; 1934; Aleppo, Syria
- Died: April 23, 2014 (aged 79–80); Saudi Arabia
- Resting place: Sulaibikhat Cemetery, Kuwait
- Education: Damascus University, Al-Azhar University
- Occupations: Faqih, Professor, Researcher
- Writing career
- Language: Arabic
- Period: 1958–2014
- Genres: Fiqh, Islamic jurisprudence, Lexicography
- Notable works: Encyclopedia of the Fiqh of the Salaf series Dictionary of Islamic Legal Terminology
- Literary movement: Hanafi, Salafi

Muhammad Rawas Qal'aji (Arabic: محمد رواس قلعه جي; 1934 – April 23, 2014) was a prominent Syrian jurist, scholar of Islamic jurisprudence, and prolific author. (Note: His surname is alternatively transliterated in English academic publications as Qala'aji, Kalaaji, or Kala'ji.) He was particularly renowned for his extensive work in systematizing the legal opinions of the Salaf (the early generations of Muslims), making them accessible to modern researchers and practitioners. Trained in the Hanafi school of law but maintaining a strong methodological inclination toward the Salafi approach of evidence-based jurisprudence, (Note: While formally trained in Hanafi jurisprudence, Qal'aji adopted the methodology of Ahl al-Hadith in verifying the authenticity of legal texts, which allowed his works to be widely accepted across different Islamic schools of thought.) Qal'aji's contributions bridged the gap between classical Islamic legal heritage and contemporary academic needs.

== Early life and education ==
Muhammad Rawas Qal'aji was born in 1934 in the city of Aleppo, Syria, a historic center of Islamic scholarship, into a family that valued literature and religious sciences. His formal religious education began at the prestigious Al-Khasrawiyya Sharia School (the Sharia Secondary School of Aleppo), where he studied under some of the city's most distinguished scholars. Most notably, he was a student of the historian and traditionist Muhammad Raghib al-Tabbakh.

During his formative years in Aleppo, he also studied under Sheikh Abdul Wahab Sukkar and Sheikh Muhammad al-Salqini. Upon completing his secondary education, he moved to Damascus to enroll in the Faculty of Sharia and Law at Damascus University. It was here that he came under the mentorship of the Moroccan scholar Muhammad al-Muntasir al-Kattani, who recognized Qal'aji's academic potential and appointed him as an assistant. Al-Kattani was instrumental in directing Qal'aji's interest toward the jurisprudence of the early generations (Fiqh al-Salaf). During his undergraduate years, Qal'aji also balanced his studies with teaching Islamic education in secondary schools across Damascus and Daraa, and he earned a diploma in journalism to enhance his skills in academic writing and periodical publication. He graduated from Damascus University in 1958 with a degree in Sharia and Law.

== Academic and professional career ==
Following his graduation, Qal'aji worked as a teacher in various Syrian cities, including Deir ez-Zor and Idlib, before returning to his hometown of Aleppo. During this period, he was active in curriculum development for Sharia schools, authoring textbooks on rhetoric and public speaking.

In pursuit of higher academic credentials, he enrolled at Al-Azhar University in Cairo, Egypt. He focused his research on the legal thought of the early Tabi'un, specifically the jurist Ibrahim al-Nakha'i. He obtained both his Master's and Doctorate from Al-Azhar, completing his PhD in 1975.

Qal'aji's professional career was marked by significant contributions to major Islamic institutional projects. In 1967, he was invited by the Kuwaiti Ministry of Awqaf and Islamic Affairs to serve as a researcher for the Kuwaiti Encyclopedia of Fiqh (al-Mawsu'ah al-Fiqhiyyah), a monumental project aimed at codifying Islamic law. He worked under the supervision of his former teacher, the renowned jurist Mustafa al-Zarqa.

He later transitioned to academia in Saudi Arabia, where he served as a professor at the King Fahd University of Petroleum and Minerals in Dhahran for four years, followed by a long tenure at King Saud University in Riyadh. After reaching the mandatory retirement age in Saudi Arabia, he returned to Kuwait to teach at Kuwait University and later served as a consultant for the Ministry of Awqaf. He eventually returned to Aleppo to spend his final years in his birthplace.

== Scholarly contributions ==
Qal'aji is best known for his "Encyclopedia of the Fiqh of the Salaf" (Mawsu'at Fiqh al-Salaf). This series was a groundbreaking effort to extract the legal rulings and opinions of the Sahaba (Companions of the Prophet) and the Tabi'un (the following generation) from primary sources such as Hadith collections and classical compendiums. He organized these opinions alphabetically and thematically, mirroring the structure of modern legal codes. This work is considered essential for scholars of comparative Fiqh (al-Fiqh al-Muqaran). (Note: The entire encyclopedia series took Qal'aji over three decades to compile and consists of dozens of volumes, representing one of the most comprehensive modern academic efforts to document the legal opinions of early Muslim figures.)

Additionally, his co-authored work, the Dictionary of Islamic Legal Terminology (Mu'jam Lughat al-Fuqaha), remains a standard reference for translating and understanding technical Arabic legal terms in English.

== Death ==
Muhammad Rawas Qal'aji died in the early hours of Wednesday, April 23, 2014 (23 Jumada al-Akhira 1435 AH), while in Saudi Arabia. His body was transported to Kuwait, where he was buried in the Sulaibikhat Cemetery.

== Selected bibliography ==
=== Original works ===
- Contemporary Financial Transactions (1999)
- Dictionary of Islamic Legal Terminology (Arabic-English, co-authored, 1985)
- Encyclopedia of the Fiqh of Ibn Taymiyyah
- The Simplified Encyclopedia of Fiqh
- Our Leader and Theirs: Between Machiavelli and Umar ibn al-Khattab

=== Encyclopedia of the Fiqh of the Salaf series ===
This series includes individual encyclopedias dedicated to the jurisprudence of:

- Abu Bakr
- Umar ibn al-Khattab
- Uthman ibn Affan
- Ali ibn Abi Talib
- Abdullah ibn Mas'ud
- Abdullah ibn Abbas
- Abdullah ibn Umar
- Ibrahim al-Nakha'i
- Al-Hasan al-Basri
- Sufyan al-Thawri
- Zayd ibn Thabit
- Ibn Jarir al-Tabari
- Abu Hurairah
- Umar ibn Abd al-Aziz
- Al-Layth ibn Sa'ad
- Al-Awza'i

=== Edited works (Tahqiq) ===
- Al-Mukhtar fi 'Ilaj Amrad al-'Ayn by Ammar al-Mawsili (co-edited with Zafir al-Wafai)
- Sifat al-Safwa by Ibn al-Jawzi
- Dala'il al-Nubuwwah by Abu Nu'aym al-Isfahani
