= Kitab al-Kharaj =

Kitab al-Kharaj (The Book of Taxation) is an book on Islamic jurisprudence, public finance, and legal administration written by the 8th-century Islamic jurist Abu Yusuf, a student of Abu Hanifa. It was written at the request of Abbasid Caliph Harun al-Rashid to provide guidelines for fiscal policy, judicial governance and land administration in accordance with Islamic jurisprudence across the Caliphate.
