= Hammad ibn Abi Sulayman =

Early Muslim jurist from Kufa

- حماد بن أبي سليمان

Personal life
- Died: 738 Kufa, Umayyad Caliphate

Religious life
- Religion: Islam

Muslim leader
- Students: Abu Hanifa
- Influenced by: Ibrahim al-Nakha'i, al-Sha'bi

Hammad ibn Abi Sulayman (Note: (Arabic: حماد بن أبي سليمان, romanized: Ḥammād ibn Abī Sulaymān) (died 738 CE) was an early Kufan Muslim jurist who is best known for being the principal teacher of Abu Hanifa, the eponym of the Hanafi school of law.

== Biography ==
The extant biographical information about Hammad is limited. It is known that he was a mawla (client) of the family of Abu Musa al-Ash'ari, a companion of Muhammad. His father was wealthy, allowing Hammad to dedicate himself solely to his legal studies. He became the student of Ibrahim al-Nakha'i in Kufa, who appears to have been his sole mentor in fiqh, although he also studied under al-Sha'bi and met Hasan al-Basri, Said ibn al-Musayyib and the companion Anas ibn Malik. He began issuing legal verdicts during al-Nakha'i's lifetime and inherited his halaqa (study circle) following his death in 714.

The jurisprudence of Hammad focused on ra'y and understanding the underlying causes ('illah) of rulings, following al-Nakha'i in this regard. Various accounts describe crowds mocking Hammad for his use of legal analogy (qiyas).

Abu Hanifa attended the halaqa of Hammad for eighteen to twenty years and eventually, due to his ability, was afforded the privilege of sitting directly in front of Hammad. The isnad of Abu Hanifa – Hammad – al-Nakha'i is regarded as the "golden Kufan chain". Hammad died in Kufa in 738. Abu Hanifa led his halaqa thereafter, and named his son Hammad in tribute to his teacher.
