= Abu Yusuf =

Arab Muslim Scholar and jurist (died 798)

- Title: Head Student of Imam Abu Hanifa

Personal life
- Born: 729 Kufa, Umayyad Caliphate
- Died: 798 (aged 68–69) Baghdad, Abbasid Caliphate
- Era: Islamic Golden Age
- Region: Iraq
- Main interest: Islamic Jurisprudence
- Notable idea: Evolution of Islamic Jurisprudence
- Notable works: Kitab al-Kharaj; Ikhtilaf Abi Hanifa wa Ibn Abi Layla

Religious life
- Religion: Islam
- Denomination: Sunni
- Jurisprudence: Hanafi

Muslim leader
- Influenced by: Abu Hanifa, Ibn Abi Layla
- Influenced: Hanafis Maturidis

Yaʿqūb ibn Ibrāhīm al-Anṣārī (Arabic: يَعْقُوبُ بْنُ إِبْرَاهِيمَ الْأَنْصَارِيُّ, lit. 'Jacob, son of Abraham, the Ansari': ; 729–798), commonly known as Abū Yūsuf (Arabic: أَبُو يُوسُفَ, lit. 'Father of Joseph'), was a prominent Muslim jurist and one of the foremost authorities of the early Hanafi school of Islamic law. He was the leading student of Abu Hanifa and played a decisive role in consolidating, systematizing, and spreading Hanafi jurisprudence throughout the Abbasid Caliphate.

Abū Yūsuf also studied under Malik ibn Anas in Medina, which exposed him to alternative legal methodologies and influenced his juristic reasoning. He was appointed as the first Qadi al-Qudat (Chief Justice) under the Abbasid caliph Harun al-Rashid, a position through which he significantly expanded the official adoption of Hanafi law within the state judiciary.

Abū Yūsuf is particularly known for his work Kitab al-Kharaj, written at the request of the caliph, which addresses taxation, public finance, and governance in accordance with Islamic legal principles and remains one of the earliest systematic treatises on Islamic fiscal law.

== Biography ==
Abu Yusuf lived in Kufa and Baghdad, in what is now Iraq, during the 8th century. His genealogy has been traced back to Sa'd ibn Habta, a youth in Medina in the time of the Islamic prophet Muhammad, and his birth date is estimated based on the date of his death to be around 113/729CE.

Based on anecdotal stories, Abu Yusuf was raised poor but with a ferocious appetite for knowledge. His mother disapproved of his academic desires, insisting that he master some trade (the art of tailoring, according to some source) so as to help make ends meet. While it cannot be fully verified, stories suggest that he complied with his mother's wishes, but also kept up his academic studies. His talent and commitment was eventually recognized by Abu Hanifa who became his mentor with Abu Yusuf as his star pupil. He is portrayed as an incredibly studious individual who was unceasing in his pursuit for knowledge and legal understanding. While much of what is known of his early childhood relies on sometimes contradictory anecdotal evidence, it has been verified that he studied religious law and traditions in Kufa and Medina under a number of scholars including Abu Hanifa, Malik b. Anas, al-Layth b. Sa'd and others. Under the guidance of Abu Hanifa, Abu Yusuf achieved incredible success and helped develop and spread the influence of the Hanafi school of Islamic law.

Abu Yusuf lived in Kufa until he was appointed Qadi in Baghdad. It is unclear whether he was appointed by al-Mahdi, al-Hadi, or Harun al-Rashid. According to one story, Abu Yusuf was able to provide sound advice pertaining to religious law to a government official who rewarded him generously and recommended him to the caliph, Harun al-Rashid. He continued to provide satisfactory legal opinions to the caliph who drew him into his inner circle and eventually appointed him Qadi. While this version of events is probable, it is not necessarily authentic and cannot be independently verified. What is known is that Abu Yusuf became a close acquaintance of Abbasid caliph, Harun al-Rashid, who eventually granted him the title of Grand Qadi, or Qadi 'l-qudat; the first time such a title had been conferred upon someone in Islamic history. While at the time it was meant as an honorific title, the Caliph frequently consulted Abu Yusuf on legal matters and financial policy and even bestowed upon him the ability to appoint other Qadis in the empire. This made the position of Grand Qadi analogous to a modern-day chief justice. Abu Yusuf held the position of Grand Qadi until his death in 182/798CE.

== Literary works ==
During his lifetime, Abu Yusuf created a number of literary works on a range of subjects including Islamic jurisprudence, international law, narrations of collected traditions (ahadith), and others. The Kitāb al-Fihrist, a bibliographic compilation of books written in the 10th century by Ibn al-Nadim, mentions numerous titles authored by Abu Yusuf. With one exception, none of these works listed in the Fihrist have survived. The exception is his book entitled Kitāb al-Kharāj, a treatise on taxation and financial issues facing the empire written at the request of the caliph, Harun al-Rashid. The Islamic empire was at the height of its power at the time of his writing and in his treatise, he sought to advise the caliph on how to appropriately conduct financial policies in accordance with religious law. While the caliph took some suggestions and ignored others, the overall effect was to limit the ruler's discretion over the tax system. A selection of other works credited to him that do not appear in the Fihrist have also survived. The Kitab al-Athar is a collection of Kufian traditions (ahadith) which he narrated. Kitab Ikhtilaf Abi Hanifa wa Ibn Abi Layla is a comparison of the opinions between the legal authorities, Abu Hanifa and Ibn Abi Layla. Kitab al-Radd ‘Ala Siyar al-Awza’i is a "reasoned refutation with broad systematic developments," of the opinions regarding the laws of war of the famous Syrian scholar, al-Awza’i. Some excerpts from his various other works that have not survived in their totality were incorporated in texts written by his disciples and were passed on through succeeding generations. For example, excerpts from Abu Yusuf's book, Kitabal-Hiyal (Book of Legal Devices) were incorporated in the book, Kitabal-Makharidj fi 'l-Hiyal written by his disciple, Muhammad al-Shaybani.

== Doctrine and methodology ==
As a disciple of Abu Hanifa, Abu Yusuf's doctrine largely presupposes that of his mentor. His writings and prominent political positions helped advance the Hanafi school of Islamic law throughout the Islamic empire. While most of his legal opinions (fatwas) were firmly rooted in the doctrine and methodology espoused by his former teacher, there are some points on which he diverged and revealed his own legal thought.

Abu Yusuf's greatest legacy is in affirming and advancing the Hanafi legal school as the predominant source of legal thought in the Islamic empire and providing a legal framework for defining and restricting caliphal authority in regard to fiscal policy. As the chief jurist for Abbasid Caliph Harun al-Rashid, he wrote the book Kitab al-Kharaj. This book outlined Abu Yusuf's ideas on taxation, public finance, and agricultural production. He discussed proportional tax on produce instead of fixed taxes on property as being superior as an incentive to bring more land into cultivation. He also advocated forgiving tax policies which favor the producer and a centralized tax administration to reduce corruption. Abu Yusuf favored the use of tax revenues for socioeconomic infrastructure, and included discussion of various types of taxes, including sales tax, death taxes, and import tariffs.

== List of works ==
- Kitab al-Kharaj, his most famous work, is a treatise on taxation and fiscal problems of the state prepared for the caliph.
- Usul al-fiqh - the earliest known work of principles of Islamic jurisprudence. A portion of his works were devoted to international law.
- Kitab ul-Aathar, a collection of traditions (ahadith) he narrated.
- Ikhtilaf Abi Hanifa wa Ibn Abi Layla, one of the early works on comparative fiqh
- Kitab al-Radd ‘Ala Siyar al-Awza’i, a refutation of the famous Syrian jurist and tradition, al-Awza’i on the law of war.

== Early Islam scholars ==
Early Islamic scholars

Muhammad, The final Messenger of God (570–632) the Constitution of Medina, taught the Quran, and advised his companions
Abdullah ibn Masud (died 653) taught	Ali (607–661) fourth caliph taught	Aisha, Muhammad's wife and Abu Bakr's daughter taught	Abd Allah ibn Abbas (618–687) taught	Zayd ibn Thabit (610–660) taught	Umar (579–644) second caliph taught	Abu Hurairah (603–681) taught
Alqama ibn Qays (died 681) taught	Husayn ibn Ali (626–680) taught	Qasim ibn Muhammad ibn Abi Bakr (657–725) taught and raised by Aisha	Urwah ibn Zubayr (died 713) taught by Aisha, he then taught	Said ibn al-Musayyib (637–715) taught	Abdullah ibn Umar (614–693) taught	Abd Allah ibn al-Zubayr (624–692) taught by Aisha, he then taught
Ibrahim al-Nakha’i taught	Ali ibn Husayn Zayn al-Abidin (659–712) taught	Hisham ibn Urwah (667–772) taught	Ibn Shihab al-Zuhri (died 741) taught	Salim ibn Abd-Allah ibn Umar taught	Umar ibn Abdul Aziz (682–720) raised and taught by Abdullah ibn Umar
Hammad ibn Abi Sulayman taught	Muhammad al-Baqir (676–733) taught	Farwah bint al-Qasim Jafar's mother
Abu Hanifa (699–767) wrote Al Fiqh Al Akbar and Kitab Al-Athar, jurisprudence followed by Sunni, Sunni Sufi, Barelvi, Deobandi, Zaidiyyah and originally by the Fatimid and taught	Zayd ibn Ali (695–740)	Ja'far bin Muhammad Al-Baqir (702–765) Muhammad and Ali's great great grand son, jurisprudence followed by Shia, he taught	Malik ibn Anas (711–795) wrote Muwatta, jurisprudence from early Medina period now mostly followed by Maliki Sunnis in North Africa, and taught	Al-Waqidi (748–822) wrote history books like Kitab al-Tarikh wa al-Maghazi, student of Malik ibn Anas	Abu Muhammad Abdullah ibn Abdul Hakam (died 829) wrote biographies and history books, student of Malik ibn Anas
Abu Yusuf (729–798) wrote Usul al-fiqh	Muhammad al-Shaybani (749–805)	al-Shafi‘i (767–820) wrote Al-Risala, jurisprudence followed by Shafi'i Sunnis and Sufis, and taught	Ismail ibn Ibrahim	Ali ibn al-Madini (778–849) wrote The Book of Knowledge of the Companions	Ibn Hisham (died 833) wrote early history and As-Sirah an-Nabawiyyah, Muhammad's biography
Isma'il ibn Ja'far (719–775)	Musa al-Kadhim (745–799)	Ahmad ibn Hanbal (780–855) wrote Musnad Ahmad ibn Hanbal jurisprudence followed by Hanbali Sunnis and Sufis	Muhammad al-Bukhari (810–870) wrote Sahih al-Bukhari hadith books	Muslim ibn al-Hajjaj (815–875) wrote Sahih Muslim hadith books	Dawud al-Zahiri (815–883/4) founded the Zahiri school	Muhammad ibn Isa at-Tirmidhi (824–892) wrote Jami` at-Tirmidhi hadith books	Al-Baladhuri (died 892) wrote early history Futuh al-Buldan, Genealogies of the Nobles
Ibn Majah (824–887) wrote Sunan ibn Majah hadith book	Abu Dawood (817–889) wrote Sunan Abu Dawood Hadith Book
Muhammad ibn Ya'qub al-Kulayni (864- 941) wrote Kitab al-Kafi hadith book followed by Twelver Shia	Muhammad ibn Jarir al-Tabari (838–923) wrote History of the Prophets and Kings, Tafsir al-Tabari	Abu al-Hasan al-Ash'ari (874–936) wrote Maqālāt al-islāmīyīn, Kitāb al-luma, Kitāb al-ibāna 'an usūl al-diyāna
Ibn Babawayh (923–991) wrote Man La Yahduruhu al-Faqih jurisprudence followed by Twelver Shia	Sharif Razi (930–977) wrote Nahj al-Balagha followed by Twelver Shia	Nasir al-Din al-Tusi (1201–1274) wrote jurisprudence books followed by Ismaili and Twelver Shia	Al-Ghazali (1058–1111) wrote The Niche for Lights, The Incoherence of the Philosophers, The Alchemy of Happiness on Sufism	Rumi (1207–1273) wrote Masnavi, Diwan-e Shams-e Tabrizi on Sufism
Key: Some of Muhammad's Companions	Key: Taught in Medina	Key: Taught in Iraq	Key: Worked in Syria	Key: Travelled extensively collecting the sayings of Muhammad and compiled books of hadith	Key: Worked in Persia

== See also ==
- Islamic scholars
- Great Qadi
- Muhammad al-Shaybani
- Sharia
- List of Islamic scholars described as father or founder of a field

== Sources ==
- Hosseini, Hamid S. (2003), "Contributions of Medieval Muslim Scholars to the History of Economics and their Impact: A Refutation of the Schumpeterian Great Gap", in Biddle, Jeff E.; Davis, Jon B.; Samuels, Warren J. (eds.), A Companion to the History of Economic Thought, Malden, Massachusetts: Blackwell, pp. 28–45, doi:10.1002/9780470999059.ch3, ISBN 0-631-22573-0
