= Amir al-Sha'bi =

Historian

Amir ibn Sharahil al-Sha'bi عامر بن شراحيل الشعبي
- Title: Imam

Personal life
- Born: c. 641 CE Kufa, Iraq
- Died: c. 723 (aged 81–82) Kufa, Iraq
- Era: Rashidun-Umayyad
- Notable works: Prophetic biography; Fatwa regarding inheritance for Hermaphrodite
- Occupation: Caliphate official; Ulama; Qadi; Teacher

Religious life
- Religion: Islam
- Creed: Atharism
- Movement: Tabi'un

Muslim leader
- Influenced by: Ibn Abbas
- Influenced: Caliph Abd al-Malik ibn Marwan; Ibn Abi Layla; Ibn Sirin; Hanafi school scholars such as Abu Hanifa, Abu Yusuf, and Al-Sarakhsi; Shafi'i school scholars; Hanbali school scholars such as Ibn Qudamah

Abū ʿAmr ʿĀmir ibn Sharāḥīl ibn ʿAbd al-Kūfī al-Shaʿbī (Arabic: أبو عمرو عامر بن شراحيل بن عبد الكوفي الشعبي), 641–723, commonly known as Imam al-Sha'bi or al-Sha'bi, was an Arab historian and jurist of the tabi'un, born during the rule of Umar ibn al-Khattab.

As a prominent figure in Kufa, al-Sha'bi was heavily involved in the political struggle in Iraq between Abd Allah ibn al-Zubayr, Mukhtar al-Thaqafi, Al-Hajjaj ibn Yusuf, and Ibn al-Ash'ath.

Al-Sha’bi was appointed among the first jurists of leading Islamic law, including ʽAbd al-Razzaq al-Sanʽani and Ibn Abi Shaybah. Al-Sha'bi seems to have been interested in reconstructing chronologies of historical events. Accounts attributed to him primarily concern themselves with conquests in eastern provinces of the caliphate, and one deals with the chronology of the life of Muhammad.

Al-Sha'bi was known for his moderate view who denouncing extremism during the time of political upheavals.

== Biography ==
ʿĀmir al-Shaʿbī belonged to the Banū Hassān ibn ʿAmr which was also known as Banu Sha'bi, a division of a tribe from Himyarite Kingdom that traced their ancestry to a clan chief named Hassān ibn ʿAmr Dhū al-Shaʿbain. However, the branch of Banū Hassān ibn ʿAmr which al-Shaʿbī belonged to had already joined the tribe of Banu Hamdān in Yemen before al-Sha'bi was born. Thus, causing the al-Sha'bi clan to be nicknamed as "lesser Hamdāni" (šaʿb Hamdān aṣ-ṣuġrā).

In 637, al-Shaʿbī's father, Sharāḥīl ibn ʿAbd al-Kūfī, fought in the Battle of Jalula in Iraq, where he meet al-Sha'bi's mother who was captured in this battle and was given to Sharāḥīl as reward of his service. The early education of Amir al-Sha'bi was not much known, except by his own admission that he studied under the disciples of Abd Allah ibn Mas'ud and studying Arithmetic under al-Hārith al-Aʿwar, a disciple of Ali, fourth caliph of Rashidun Caliphate. Physically, al-Sha'bi was described as skinny.

Ibn Qutaybah recorded that during the Second Fitna, al-Sha'bi initially served as secretary to the governors of Kufa appointed by Abd Allah ibn al-Zubayr, ' Abdallāh ibn Yazīd al-Khatami (684–685) and 'Abdallāh ibn Mutī' al-'Adawī (685). However, later, al-Sha'bi and his father changed allegiance to Mukhtar al-Thaqafi. During this period, al-Sha'bi was paid by al-Mukhtar and participated in his military operations. However, as the al-Mukhtār's movement became more radical, al-Sha'bi grew disillusioned with al-Mukhtar, thus he parted way with al-Mukhtar, and began to criticize the Shia movements under al-Mukhtar.

Later, Al-Sha'bi later gained huge reputation that caliph ʿAbd al-Malik ibn Marwan entrusted him with the education of his children.

Later, Al-Sha'bi began his career as judge in Kufa after al-Hajjaj ibn Yusuf entered Kufa in 694 as Emir of Iraq. Furthermore, al-Hajjaj made al-Sha'bi as the administrator and leader of two tribe in Kufa, Banu Sha'bi and Banu Hamdan. This happened during the tenure of Ziyad ibn Abihi as governor of the Kufa. Ibn Sirin met al-Sha'bi first time during his tenure in Kufa.

In 699, however, al-Sha'bi joined the revolt of Ibn al-Ash'ath. He marched within the ranks of Quran memorizers under Ibn al-Ash'ath against al-Hajjaj and also attended the Battle of Deir al-Jamajim. After the rebellion collapsed and Ibn al-Ash'ath defeated, al-Sha'bi went into hiding for fear of reprisal from al-Hajjaj. When he learned that al-Hajjaj promised amnesty for those who joined the army of Qutayba ibn Muslim in Khorasan province, al-Sha'bi traveled east on a donkey. He followed the military campaign under Qutayba's command as far as Fergana, until Qutayba recognized him and employed him as his secretary. However, al-Hajjaj learned this and demanded Qutayba to send al-Sha'bi to his presence. Qutayba then had him brought to Wasit. After al-Sha'bi professing his repentance for his role in the rebellion, he was pardoned by al-Hajjaj. An important role in al-Hajjaj's rehabilitation was played by al-Hajjaj's foster brother and secretary Yazid ibn Abi Muslim, and a son of al-Hajjaj, where the two of them continues to beg the pardon for al-Sha'bi.

At some point of his lifetime, there were emergence of four political-religious extreme movements; consisted of Qadariyah, Murji'ah, Kharijites, and Shiite. Al-Sha'bi was recorded being strongly condemned all of those movements. At some time he engaged in a debate against a Shia preacher named al-Mughira ibn Sa'id regarding a stance about Khulafa al-Rashidun (first four caliphs of Rashidun caliphate), where al-Sha'bi openly stated he supported and acknowledged all of the caliphs, unlike the Qadarites, Murji'ites, Kharijites, or Shiites followers who only acknowledged certain Rashidun caliphs partially; or even denouncing them all.

However, his career as leading jurist in Kufa came to an abrupt end. One report states that al-Sha'bī left the mosque in resignation after the arrivals of new scholars in Kufa, such as Hammād ibn Abī Sulaimān, the teacher of Abū Hanīfa, or al-Hakam ibn ʿUtba (d. 733)

According to one of his students named ʿAlī al-Ghudānī, Al-Sha'bi has met with more than 500 Companions of the Prophet during his lifetime.

There are different reports about al-Sha'bī's date of death, which range between 721 AD and 729 AD.

== Influence and view ==
Al-Sha'bi was of the leading Muslim chronicler who focused on narratives on the Islamic history discipline of Maghazi (expeditions and conquests). His narrations are scattered in many books. His narration style were greatly religious driven.

=== Hadith science ===
Ibn Rajab has recorded a Hadith Qudse regarding the number of Zabaniyah, archangels of hell, from Al-Sha'bi; which was traced to the authority of Al-Bara' ibn Azib.

Another hadith which recorded transmitted by al-Sha'bi was a hadith about archangel Jibril which traced on the authority of Jabir ibn Abd Allah.

=== Jurisprudence ===
Al-Sha'bi was considered influential jurist among his contemporary. Ibn Sirin was recorded to asking counsel about Islamic jurisprudence to al-Sha'bi. Makhūl ibn Abī Muslim al-Shamī, another Tabi'un contemporary and prominent Hadith scholar, has praised al-Sha'bi for his jurisprudensic expertise, and his knowledge of sunnah. Unlike his colleague Ibrahim al-Nakha'i, who relied primarily on Qiyas (analogic deduction) in his scholastic method, al-Shaʿbī strongly relied primarily on scriptural traditions (Atharism). He also tried to convince other scholars that Qiyās was not a valid argument. Al-Sha'bi was recorded to have said: "Beware of Qiyās. For when you use it, you make what is halal to be haram and what is haram to be halal.".

Regarding inheritances, al-Sha'bi based his fatwa on the legal opinion of Ibn Abbas. In particular, the notable fatwa produced by al-Sha'bi was the Fiqh ruling of the inheritance regarding intersex (Hermaphrodite) person, or Khunta Al-Mushkal; which in Islamic jurisprudence means his or her physical (genital organs) and sexual characteristics (beard, voice, or menstruation) cannot be determined; hence the jurisprudensic consequence of this fatwa ruled that a hermaphrodite person has the rights of the half portion of each male and female inheritance portion from his or her parents. The exact rulings of al-Sha'bi was in the case if the inheritors were a son and a daughter, the daughter inherited is half of the son, that is the male the equivalent of the share of two females in iheritance, so it is as if the male is in the position of two females, and one of the two females in relation to the hermaphrodite is known, and the other female is fixed in a state without a state, so he is equal, so the hermaphrodite is in the position of a female and a half. Furthermore, Al-Sha'bi's rulings according to the later era scholars such as Abu Yusuf was, if the hermaphrodite is a known for dominant male biological traits, then he gets a third of the money, and if he is a female, then she gets a third, so he is given.” Half of each case, so he gets half the money, and the rest is for the descendants, because in the event that he is entitled to a third of the money, which is if the hermaphrodite has dominant female traits, and in the event that he has nothing, then he gets half a third, which is one-sixth.

The scholars of Hanafi school, such as Abu Hanifa, and his two students, Abu Yusuf and Muhammad al-Hanafi, has adopted Al-Sha'bi fatwa for their rulings of hermaphrodite inheritance, as it was recorded by al-Sarakhsi in his work, Kitab al-Mabsut.

Ibn Qudamah has recorded the Hanbali school of though also takes this rulings of Al-Sha'bi that if a questioned hermaphrodite still not reaching puberty when the inheritance from the parents is about to be shared.

Shafiʽi school scholars also adopted this approach if a gender of a person cannot be described.

=== Politic ===
"If the Shiites were birds, they would be vultures. But if they were mounts, they would be donkeys.".

Al-Sha'bi comment about Shia sectarian movement

Al-Sha'bi also known for his oppositions against the four emerging political-religious view of Qadariyah, Murji'ah, Kharijites, and Shia during his lifetime. He particularly condemn those movements for their partial stance of the Islamic tenet, and for their hostile stance against the Four Rightly Guided Caliphs and the Companions of the Prophet. One of the most offensive view of the Shiite according to al-Sha'bi was the Kaysanites branch for their hatred to Aisha, the third wife of Muhammad, as al-Sha'bi goes as far as such though is considered the violation of sunnah. In this context, al-Sha'bi even expressed his contempt for the Shia followers and even commented derogatorily as he likened the Shia to vultures and donkeys.

Due to this stance, modern historian and Scottish orientalist W. Montgomery Watt has regarded al-Sha'bi represented the centrist view of Islam and a moderate figure amid the political heat on the wake the extreme religious and political sectarian in the early Islam.

== See also ==
- Al-Shafi'i
- Ahmad ibn Hanbal
- Urwah ibn Zubayr
