= Naji Ma'ruf =

Naji Ma'ruf Abd al-Razzaq al-Ubaydi al-A'zami (Note: Arabic: ناجي معروف عبد الرزاق العبيدي الأعظمي) (1910–1977) was an Iraqi historian. He was a professor of history at the University of Baghdad, who authored a collection of books, and was a member of the Iraqi Academy of Sciences.

== Early life ==
He was born in Baghdad, Adhamiyah in 1328 AH/1910 CE, where he grew up and learned the Quran in his childhood, then completed his studies there and graduated from the Higher Teachers' College.

== Career ==
He was appointed as a teacher at the Central Preparatory School in Baghdad. Then he traveled to France in 1935 CE, joining the scientific mission, where he studied at the University of Paris and the Louvre Museum under the supervision of professor (Demobin) and completed his master's and doctoral studies in history. His dissertation was titled "Al-Mustansiriya School."

Due to the outbreak of World War II and the German occupation of Paris, he returned to Baghdad. After his return, he worked in the General Directorate of Antiquities following the failure of the 1941 Iraqi coup d'état in 1941 CE.

In 1946 CE, he was appointed as director of Baghdad's religious endowments, then later appointed as dean of the Imam al-A'zam College.In 1952 CE, he was appointed dean of the College of Sharia, and in 1963 CE, he was appointed dean of the College of Arts at the University of Baghdad. In 1965 CE, he was appointed as a member of the Civil Service Council, and in 1972 CE, he was elected as an active member of the Iraqi Academy of Sciences. He was also elected as a member of the Arabic Language Academy in Damascus, Syria. He was appointed as a professor in the History Department for graduate studies at the University of Baghdad and was a member of the Baghdad Municipality Council.

Among his most important achievements was being one of the contributors to establishing the Imam Abu Hanifa Forum Association in al-Adhamiyah in 1968 CE, and he was elected as its president for nine years until his death. Through this association, he strived to establish mosques and charitable organizations in villages and rural areas. He also received a PhD from Cairo University in 1971 CE for the second time.

== Political Activity ==
Dr. Naji Ma'ruf was arrested after Rashid Ali al-Gaylani's revolution in 1941 CE, in al-Amara and al-Faw, and remained in detention for three years.

== Bibliography ==
- The Arabian Origins of Imam Abu Hanifa al-Nu'man (in Arabic) (1935)
- Introduction to the History of Arab Civilization (in Arabic) (1960).
- The Arabian Origins of Islamic Cities (in Arabic) (1964).
- History of the Arabs (in arabic).
- Summary of the history Arab Civilization (in arabic).
- Lessons in Arab Civilization History (in arabic).
- History of the Arabs in the Middle Ages (in arabic).
- Al-Farabi: Arab in Homeland and Culture (in Arabic) (1975).
- Arab Origins of Scholars Attributed to Non-Arab Regions in the Islamic Mashreq (In Arabic) (1977).

== Death ==
Naji Ma'ruf performed the Hajj pilgrimage twice, then traveled to Mecca to perform the Umrah pilgrimage in the month of Sha'ban. After completing the Umrah rituals, he died aged 67 in the city of Jeddah, on Monday night, the first of Ramadan 1397 AH/15 August 1977 CE. His body was transported to Baghdad and arrived on Wednesday night, 17 August 1977 CE. He was buried on Thursday morning in a large funeral procession from his house in the al-Safina neighborhood to the Abu Hanifa Mosque, then buried next to his son Raja in the al-Khayzuran Cemetery in Al-Adhamiyah.
