= Ibrahim al-Nakha'i =

Muslim jurist of Kufa (666–714)

- إبراهيم النخعي

Personal life
- Born: c. 666 CE / 46 AH Kufa, Umayyad Caliphate
- Died: 714 CE / 96 AH Kufa, Umayyad Caliphate

Religious life
- Religion: Islam

Muslim leader
- Influenced by: Alqama ibn Qays, Aswad ibn Yazid
- Influenced: Hammad ibn Abi Sulayman
Arabic name
- Personal (Ism): Ibrāhīm إٍبْرَاهِيم
- Patronymic (Nasab): Ibn Yazīd ٱبْن يَزِيد
- Teknonymic (Kunya): Abū ʿImrān أَبُو عِمْرَان
- Toponymic (Nisba): Al-Nakhaʿī ٱلنَّخَعِيّ

Abu Imran ibn Yazid (Arabic: إبراهيم بن يزيد, romanized: Abū ʿImrān ibn Yazīd; c. 666–714), commonly known as Ibrahim al-Nakha'i (Arabic: إبراهيم النخعي, romanized: Ibrāhīm al-Nakhaʿī), was an early Kufan jurist of the tabi'in. A pioneer of the use of ra'y and qiyas, al-Nakha'i influenced later Kufan jurists through his student Hammad ibn Abi Sulayman, including Abu Hanifa.

== Biography ==
Ibrahim al-Nakha'i was born in Kufa in c. 666, although there is some dispute on the exact year. He was of the Nakha, a branch of the Madhhaj tribe which had migrated to Kufa from Yemen following the Arab conquest of Mesopotamia, hence the nisba al-Nakha'i. His family was known for scholarly activity; his father was a hadith transmitter, his maternal uncle was Alqama ibn Qays and Aswad ibn Yazid was his maternal cousin.

Al-Nakha'i was affiliated with the students of Abd Allah ibn Mas'ud, a companion of Muhammad, which included his uncle Alqama who became his principal mentor of fiqh. He began travelling to the Hejaz from a young age, and in his youth performed the Hajj with Alqama and Aswad ibn Yazid, during which he attended a gathering of Aisha. While he met the companions of Muhammad, some of whom still lived in Kufa at the time of his death, he is not believed to have directly narrated hadith from them, and the isnad of those where he appears to do so are considered to be mursal.

Despite the tumult of the Second Fitna, al-Nakha'i continued teaching in Kufa. Mukhtar al-Thaqafi offered him an official post, which he declined. He had a strained relationship with the Umayyad authorities, openly criticising al-Hajjaj ibn Yusuf and supporting the revolt of Ibn al-Ash'ath, which at times forced him into hiding. Al-Hajjaj is said to have ordered the arrest of al-Nakha'i, who evaded apprehension. Upon hearing of al-Hajjaj's death, al-Nakha'i prostrated in thankfulness.

Teaching in the Great Mosque of Kufa, al-Nakha'i accepted Hammad ibn Abi Sulayman into his halaqa (study circle), who became his foremost student. Upon al-Nakha'i's death in 738, Hammad would become the leader of his halaqa.

== Jurisprudence ==
The fiqh of al-Nakha'i is characterised by the use of ra'y (independent reasoning), and as a result he is considered as one of the progenitors of the ahl al-ra'y. He developed and popularised the use of qiyas (analogical reasoning), which represented a systematic application of ra'y. Both prophetic hadith and athar from Muhammad's companions were considered by al-Nakha'i to be authoritative; the views of Ibn Mas'ud in particular formed the basis of his legal thought.

Al-Nakha'i was among the first Kufan jurists who was interested in the summative body of Islamic law rather than specific parts. Through qiyas, al-Nakha'i attempted to "deduce general propositions from the authoritative sources and then apply them to all relevant cases". Zafar Ishaq Ansari has argued that al-Nakha'i was motivated by a "conscious search for greater coherence and consistency" in the law, underpinned by a "notion that that the teachings of the Prophet were embodiments of general principles, rather than arbitrary fiats." However, due to the absence of an established legal tradition, al-Nakha'i fiqh was less technically developed and systematically consistent than that of the later Kufan jurists.

The origins of the Kufan jurists' tradition of formulating and answering hypothetical legal questions can be seen in the thought of al-Nakha'i. Some of the hypothesised scenarios were impossible, although he entertained these less frequently than later Kufans.

== Legacy ==
Al-Nakha'i greatly influenced later Kufan and Hanafi jurists, primarily through Hammad. Hammad's primary student, Abu Hanifa, often adduced al-Nakha'i as an authority but did not always agree with his views. Quotations of al-Nakha'i and narrations in whose isnad he is present feature prominently in the two separate works named al-Athar authored respectively by Abu Hanifa's disciples Abu Yusuf and Muhammad al-Shaybani. Al-Shafi'i describes al-Nakha'i and al-Sha'bi as the principal authorities of the Kufans. Ahmad ibn Hanbal negatively contrasts al-Nakha'i with Hasan al-Basri and Ata ibn Abi Rabah, but references al-Nakha'i 336 times in his musnad.
