= Jariri school =

Legal school in Sunni Islam

The Jariri school is the name given to a short-lived Sunni school of fiqh that was derived from the work of al-Tabari, the 9th and 10th-century Muslim scholar in Baghdad. Although it eventually became extinct, al-Tabari's madhhab flourished among Sunni ulama for two centuries after his death.

== Principles ==
University of Oxford lecturer Christopher Melchert describes the Jariri school as semi-rationalist, similar to the Shafi‘i school. It also shared features with the Ẓāhirī school in addition to the Shafi‘is. Al-Tabari was characterized by strong scriptural tendencies but from within a limited time frame. He appears, like Dawud al-Zahiri, to restrict consensus historically, defining it as the transmission by many authorities of reports on which the Sahaba agreed unanimously. Like Dawud al-Zahiri, he also held that consensus must be tied to a text and cannot be based on legal analogy. After quoting his sources—in his major works, he depended essentially on existing written works and reports—he gives what he considers to be the most acceptable view. However, his most notable difference with his contemporaries was his emphasis on Ijtihad and independent exercise of judgement. These views were shared by many influential scholars in history that reached the rank of Mujtahid (scholars who allowed to open their own Madhhab due to their knowledge vastness) such as Ibn Kathir, Ibn Taymiyyah, Ibn Hazm, Bukhari, and Zahiri Maddhab scholars.

The Jariri school was frequently in conflict with the Hanafi school of Abu Hanifa. Conflict was found with the Hanafi school on the matter of juristic preference, which the Jariri school censured severely.
