= Ahl al-Ra'y =

Early Islamic creedal school

The Ahl al-Ra'y (Note: Arabic: أهل الرأي, romanized: ahl al-raʿy, lit. 'people of reason'), sometimes referred to in English as rationalists, refers to an Islamic creedal group advocating for the use of reason for theological decisions and scriptural interpretation. They were one of two main groups debating the source of Islamic creed in the second century of Islam, the other being Ahl al-Hadith (the people of hadith).

Its proponents, which included many early jurists of the Hanafi school, used the term ra'y to refer to "sound" or "considered" reasoning, such as qiyas (analogical deduction). Their opponents from the Ahl al-Hadith creedal group held that the Quran and authentic hadith were the only admissible sources of Islamic law, and objected to any use of ra'y in jurisprudence, whether in the form of qiyas, istislah (consideration of public interest), or hiyal (legal subterfuges). According to Daniel W. Brown, Ahl al-Ra'y thought a hadith should "sometimes be subject to other overriding principles" such as the "continuous practice" of the community and "general principles of equity" which was claimed to "better represent the spirit of the Prophet" Muhammad.

Over time, Hanafi jurists gradually came to accept the primacy of the Quran and hadith advocated by the Ahl al-Hadith creedal group, restricting the use of other forms of legal reasoning to interpretation of these scriptures. In turn, Hanbali jurists, who had led the Ahl al-Hadith creedal group, gradually came to accept the use of qiyas.

== Terminology ==
Ra'y is an Arabic word that literally means reason, opinion, idea, and other similar words. According to Lisan al-Arab, ra'y was used to refer to an excellent opinion in Pre-Islamic Arabia. Later definitions used it to refer to an opinion derived from deep contemplation and sound judgement. Those who prioritized the usage of ra'y in Islamic law became known as Ahl al-Ra'y or Așḥāb al-Ra'y (Note: Arabic: أصحاب الرأي, romanized: așḥāb al-raʿy, lit. 'adherents of reason'), sometimes referred to in English as rationalists. Other names include Ahl al-Qiyās (Note: Arabic: أهل القياس, romanized: ahl al-qiyās, lit. 'people of analogy'), Ahl an-Naẓar (Note: Arabic: أهل النَظَر, romanized: ahl an-naẓar, lit. 'people of insight'), and Ahl al-Kalām (Note: Arabic: أهل ٱلْكَلَام, romanized: ahl al-kalām, lit. 'people of discourse'). Sometimes Ahl al-Kalām is considered its own separate category, containing the Mu'tazila and rejectors of hadith.

Ahl al-Ra'y did not necessarily reject all hadith. Rather, many accepted the usage of hadith but nonetheless, gave preference and greater importance to ra'y. To Ahl al-Ra'y, it was just one source of Islamic law among many, not necessarily given any more importance than other sources like qiyas or istihsan. They believed that hadith must sometimes be subjected to general religious principles like the "continuous practice" of the community and "general principles of equity" which was claimed to "better represent the spirit of the Prophet" Muhammad.

== History ==
Ra'y originally was viewed in a very positive sense to refer to sound and considered opinion based on reasoning. The emergence of hadith did not initially affect these established forms of legal reasoning, and ra'y continued to dominate the Islamic world until the mid-8th century CE. About two-thirds of Zuhrī's transmitted doctrine contained ra'y and only one third contained reports from earlier authorities. For Qatada ibn Di'ama, 62% of his transmitted doctrine contained ra'y and of what was remaining, 84% was the ra'y of previous authorities.

However, starting around the end of the 7th century, there had been a growing movement to codify the sunnah into written hadith, rather than being largely verbally told by scholars and storytellers. It became a common practice amongst some scholars to "travel in search of knowledge" (talab al-'ilm). In this case, the "search for knowledge" was searching throughout the caliphate for textual sources that could be used for the compilation of hadith. While ra'y was initially the dominant source of Islamic law, this would soon change with the rise of traditionalism (Ahl al-Hadith), as the term got an increasingly negative association with arbitrary or fallible human thought. The beginning of this decline seems to start with Umayyad Caliph Umar II, ordering that any judge he appointed resort to 'ilm instead of ra'y when in doubt.

Traditionalists would at times claim ra'y was imposing human subjectivity onto God, while rationalists would at times claim much of the hadith materials, especially akhbār al-āḥād (single-transmitter reports), to have too uncertain accuracy. Traditionalists would often be accused of being primitive while rationalists were accused of being impious. In contrast to previous centuries where few jurists were seen as traditionalists (and most had acquired this description after the fact), the 9th century had many jurists identify clearly as traditionalists. The traditionalists had experienced an "unprecedented upsurge" by the last quarter of the 8th century, and by the mid-9th century, "ḥadīth had won the war against ra'y". Conversion from the rationalist to traditionalist camp was "frequent" while the reverse was "rare to nonexistent". By the 9th century, the term ra'y itself even lost any ground in legal discourse, with the terms qiyas and ijtihad being favored, having not gained a negative connotation.

After Al-Shafi'i (founder of the Shafi'i school), traditionalism "gained significant strength, attracting many jurists who can easily be described as staunch opponents of rationalism". Ahmad ibn Hanbal (founder of the Hanbali school) and Dawud al-Zahiri (founder of the Zahiri school) went even further than Al-Shafi'i in emphasis of the "centrality of scripture" and criticism of the apparent "repugnant nature of human reasoning". However, ibn Hanbal did accept the use of qiyas when considered absolutely necessary while al-Zahiri categorically opposed it in all circumstances. Thus during the seven decades between al-Shafi'i and al-Zahiri, the traditionalist movement took a staunch uncompromising opposition towards rationalism. The Mihna, an 18-year period of persecution against traditionalists, instituted by Abbasid caliph al-Ma'mun, had made its victims like ibn Hanbal emerge as heroes, and its eventual end exemplifying the defeat of the rationalists. The Mihna's end had ended "the feud between the rationalists (Ahl al-Ra'y) and the traditionalists (Ahl al-Hadith)...with the victory of the latter." However, even by the end of the Mihna, a majority of jurists did not fully subscribe to either camp, seeing the traditionalism of ibn Hanbal as too rigid and the rationalism of the Mu'tazila and their supporters as too libertarian.

However, while exclusive affiliation to one of the two camps was common in the early to mid-9th century, most jurists by the end of the century had combined the two camps in some way. A synthesis of the two camps "flourished" between the years 870 and 1000. As it became increasingly clear that hadith was here to stay, especially with the internationalization of Islamic legal scholarship (making a more universally-applicable hadith more appealing), rationalists started to reckon with the reality of the rise of hadith and that acceptance within mainstream Islam would require compromising with traditionalists. The jurist that seems to have initiated this re-grounding of rationalists was Muhammad ibn Shuja al-Thalji, seeking to preserve the cause of his school, the Iraqi Hanafites. Extreme traditionalists also moderated, such as Hanbalites accepting limited use of qiyas (an exception being the aforementioned Zahiri school which adamantly refused to join the synthesis). By the end of the ninth century, a majority of jurists had embraced this synthesis (which is not to say these jurists completely abandoned their leanings towards one position or the other). By the 10th century, this synthesis had been fully in place, largely unquestioned until the 19th century. According to Daniel W. Brown, "[t]his was, by all appearances, a complete triumph for the așḥāb al-ḥadith", however, this victory was limited. The theoretical position of hadith remained largely unchallenged by all of the classical madhhabs but there remained debates over if Muhammad had legal intent in his statements, if his statements were related to his religious mission or other non-binding actions, and the surrounding context of his statements.

== Prominent Figures ==
Abu Hanifa

Ibn Abi Layla

== See also ==
- Ahl al-Hadith
- Ash'arism
- Ibn Kullab
- Istihsan
- Kalam
- Maturidism
- Mu'tazilism
- Qiyas
- Urf
