= Abu Hanifa =

Muslim scholar, jurist, and theologian (699–767)

Imam Abu Hanifa
- أَبُو حَنِيفَة
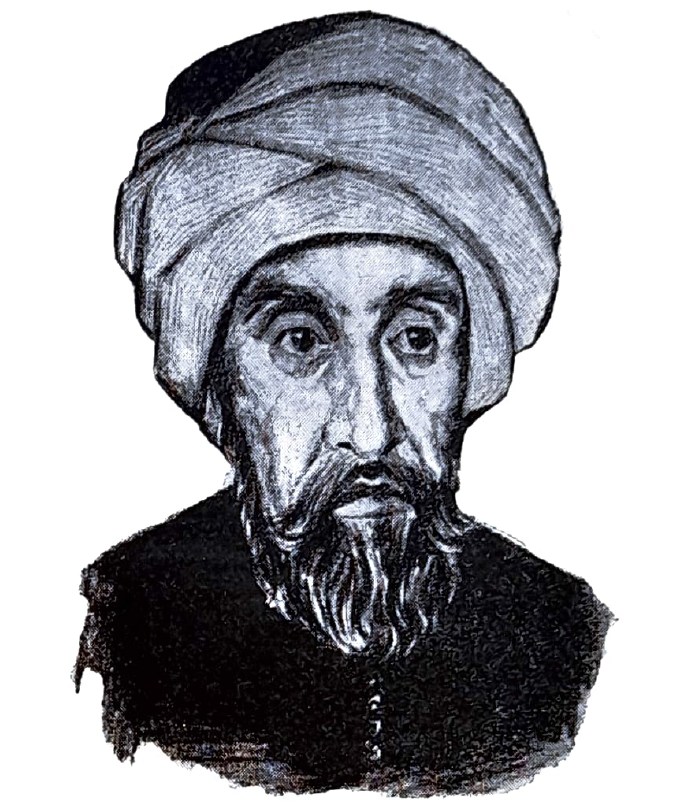
- A sketch representing Abu Hanifa from a book entitled Sayr mulhimah: min al-Sharq wa-al-Gharb by unknown author, 1961

Qadi of Iraq
- In office 747–752
- Title: Shaykh al-Islam ('Shaykh of Islam'); Al-Imam al-A'zam ('the Greatest Imam'); Siraj al-A'imma ('Lamp of the Imams')

Personal life
- Born: al-Nuʿmān ibn Thābit ibn Zūṭā ibn Marzubān al-Taymī al-Kūfī; 5 September 699 CE (Rajab 80 AH) Kufa, Umayyad Caliphate (modern-day Iraq)
- Died: 18 June 767 CE (150 AH; aged 67) Baghdad, Abbasid Caliphate (modern-day Iraq)
- Resting place: Abu Hanifa Mosque, Baghdad, Iraq
- Children: Hammad; Hanifa (disputed)
- Era: Late Umayyad – early Abbasid
- Region: Kufa
- Main interests: Jurisprudence; Theology; Asceticism
- Notable ideas: Hanafi school; Juristic choice
- Notable works: Al-Fiqh al-Akbar; Al-Fiqh al-Absat; Al-Musnad; Al-Athar; Al-Wasiyyah; Al ‘Alim wa-l Muta'allim
- Occupation: Scholar; Jurist; Theologian

Religious life
- Religion: Islam
- Denomination: Sunni
- Jurisprudence: Independent (eponym of the Hanafi school)

Muslim leader
- Influenced by: Hammad ibn Abi Sulayman; Ata' ibn Abi Rabah; Alqama ibn Marthid; Salama ibn Kuhayl; Muhammad al-Baqir; Ibrahim al-Nakha'i; Amir al-Sha'bi; Ibn Shihab al-Zuhri; Zayd ibn Ali; Ja'far al-Sadiq
- Influenced: Abu Yusuf; Muhammad al-Shaybani; Abd Allah ibn al-Mubarak; al-Tahawi; Abu Mansur al-Maturidi; al-Fudayl ibn Iyad; Waki' ibn al-Jarrah; al-Shafi'i; all Hanafis
- Arabic name
- Personal (Ism): Al-Nuʿmān ٱلنُّعْمَان
- Patronymic (Nasab): Ibn Thābit ibn Zūṭā ibn Marzubān ٱبْن ثَابِت بْن زُوطَا بْن مَرْزُبَان
- Teknonymic (Kunya): Abū Ḥanīfa أَبُو حَنِيفَة
- Toponymic (Nisba): Al-Taymī al-Kūfī ٱلتَّيْمِيّ ٱلْكُوفِيّ

Abu Hanifa (Note: Full name Abū Ḥanīfa al-Nuʿmān ibn Thābit ibn Zūṭā ibn Marzubān al-Taymī al-Kūfī (Arabic: أَبُو حَنِيفَة ٱلنُّعْمَان بْن ثَابِت بْن زُوطَا بْن مَرْزُبَان ٱلتَّيْمِيّ ٱلْكُوفِيّ); he is also known by the titles Shaykh al-Islam ("Shaykh of Islam"), al-Imam al-A'zam ("the Greatest Imam"), and Siraj al-A'imma ("Lamp of the Imams").) (Arabic: أَبُو حَنِيفَة, romanized: Abū Ḥanīfa; 5 September 699 – 18 June 767 CE) was a Muslim scholar, jurist, theologian, and ascetic, and the founder and eponym of the Hanafi school of Sunni jurisprudence. The Hanafi school remains the most widely practised of the Sunni schools and is extensively followed and applied throughout the Muslim world, predominating in Central and South Asia, Turkey, Africa, the Balkans, Russia, and parts of the Arab world.

In his youth Abu Hanifa travelled to the Hejaz and studied in the Islamic holy cities of Mecca and Medina, and he later became established as a leading religious authority in Kufa. As a jurist and theologian, Abu Hanifa became particularly associated with the use of reason in both jurisprudential rulings and theology. He played an important role as a theoretical systematizer of technical legal thought and exercised considerable influence over his students in Kufa, especially Abu Yusuf, although he never held an official post as qadi. His school was distinguished from other schools of law by its use of qiyās (analogy), istiḥsān (juristic preference), and raʾy (personal judgement) to resolve new legal problems arising in the expanding Muslim world. He also emphasized the conception of an international Muslim community united by the Qurʾān and Sunnah while avoiding extremes.

After his death, his school continued to develop, and most of its adherents eventually also came to follow the Maturidi school of theology. Al-Dhahabi described him as "one of the geniuses of the sons of Adam" who "combined jurisprudence, worship, scrupulousness, and generosity". His two principal students, Abu Yusuf and Muhammad al-Shaybani, subsequently became celebrated jurists in their own right.

Abu Hanifa maintained an independent position toward political authority. He suffered punishment and imprisonment under both the Umayyads and the Abbasids because of these independent views and his refusal to accept the official office of qadi in Kufa. He ultimately died in prison in Baghdad in 767 (AH 150).

== Name ==
There is no disagreement with his first name being Nu'man in the Muslim scholarship, although its meaning is uncertain. The range of meanings given for it include: blood on which the body survives, which some suggest is the soul; the name of a pleasantly smelling red or purple flower; or the fa'lan (template) from the word ni'mah (blessing), as Muslims believe Abu Hanifah is God's blessing upon His creation.

How Abu Hanifa earned his patronymic is disputed. According to some linguists, including Muhyi al-Din, ḥanīfa refers to "inkpot". He was often seen with one, thus earning his name this way. According to this interpretation, his name literally means the "Father of the Inkpot". Alternatively, Hanifah is the feminine form of hanif, which means a recluse (nasik) or submitter (Muslim).

However, some historians contest he earned it as he had a daughter named Hanifa. His name would then mean the "Father of Hanifa". The opposing side believes he never had a daughter with such name.

== Biography ==
=== Birth ===
Abu Hanifa came from Central Asia, although sources disagree on his precise birthplace, variously identifying Kufa, which is supported by the majority, Kabul, Anbar, Nasa, or Termez. Historians disagree with regards to where he was born, though they agree he was born during the period of the Umayyad Caliphate. However, they differ regarding the year: 699 CE / 80 AH (held by the majority of classical Muslim scholarship), 696 CE / 77 AH, 689 CE / 70 AH, or 680 CE / 61 AH. Many historians choose the latest date, 699 CE / 80 AH; however, Muhammad Zahid al-Kawthari believed the date of 689 CE / 70 AH is supported by two considerations:

- First, Muhammad ibn Makhlad al-Attar considered the narration of Abu Hanifa's son, Hammad, from Malik ibn Anas to be an example of an older man's narration rather than a younger man.
- Second, Abu Hanifa was concerned with who should succeed Ibrahim al-Nakha'i after his death in 96 AH. This concern would have only arisen if he was older than 19, since it is considered he only took his religious studies seriously after then. If Abu Hanifa was born in 80 AH, Abu Hanifa would have been 16 at the time of al-Nakhai's death.

=== Family background ===
Abu Hanifa is thought to be of Persian ancestry. However, he has also been stated to have been an Arab from the tribe of Azd, or descended from the Zuṭṭ, a Jat community present in the lower Iraq during the Islamic Golden Age. His grandfather, named Zuta, may have been captured by Muslim troops in Kabul and sold as a slave in Kufa, where he was purchased and freed by an Arab tribesman of the Taym Allah, a branch of the Banu Bakr. Zuta and his progeny thereafter would have become clients of the Taym Allah, hence the sporadic references to Abu Hanifa as "al-Taymi". Abu Hanifa was also described of being originally from the Arabs of Anbar in Iraq, who lived there before Islam. Hanafi sources confirm that he was of Arab stock, and that Thabit ibn al-Nu'man ibn al-Marzuban was from the Banu Yahya ibn Zayd ibn Asad, from the Arab tribe of Azd who migrated from Yemen and settled in Iraqi lands after the collapse of the Marib Dam due to the Great Flood, becoming part of the Nabataeans of Iraq. As Abu Hanifa's family were Christians, which was the religion of the Arabs of Iraq and the religion of the Arab Lakhmid kingdom. the name of Imam Abu Hanifa al-Nu'man has a great historical significance regarding the affiliation of his ancestors to the Arabs of Iraq who inhabited it before Islam, as it is the name of an important king of the Arab kings of Iraq, who had campaigns against the Sasanian Empire. According to Abu Hanifa's grandson, Abu Hanifa was the descendant of free Persians who had never been enslaved. He called Abu Hanifa's great-grandfather "Marzuban", which is an Arabicized form of the Sasanian military office of marzban, held by governors of the frontier provinces of the Sasanian realm. historian Naji Ma'ruf argues that the statement of Abu Hanifa's grandson, Ismail ibn Hammad, is interpreted to mean that Abu Hanifa's grandson was only referring to the place, rather than the ethnicity. That is to say, Abu Hanifa was from an Arab family that lived within Sasanian borders, not necessarily a Persian family.

=== Early life and scholarship ===
There is scant biographical information about Abu Hanifa. It is generally known that he worked a producer and seller of khazz, a type of silk clothing material. He attended lectures on jurisprudence conducted by the Kufan scholar Hammad ibn Abi Sulayman (d. 737). He also possibly learnt jurisprudence (fiqh) and narrated Hadith from the Meccan scholar Ata ibn Abi Rabah (d. c. 733) while on pilgrimage.

When Hammad died, Abu Hanifa succeeded him as the principal authority on Islamic law in Kufa and the chief representative of the Kufan school of jurisprudence. Abu Hanifa gradually gained influence as an authority on legal questions, founding a moderate rationalist school of Islamic jurisprudence that was named after him.

=== Adulthood and death ===
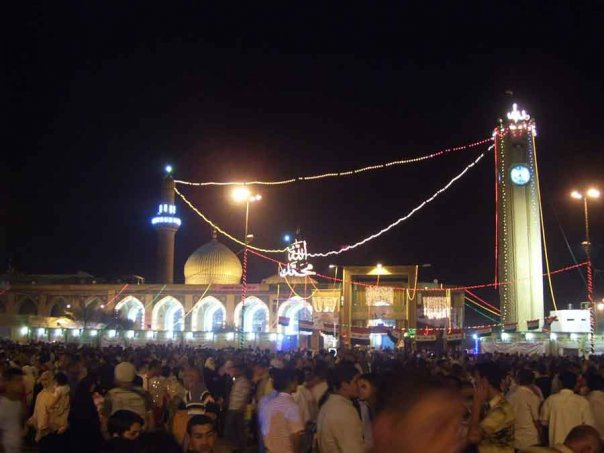
Abu Hanifa Mosque in Baghdad, Iraq

In 763, al-Mansur, the Abbasid caliph offered Abu Hanifa the post of qadi al-qudat (chief judge of the state), but he declined the offer, choosing to remain independent. His student Abu Yusuf was later appointed to the post by Caliph Harun al-Rashid.

In his reply to al-Mansur, Abu Hanifa said that he was not fit for the post. Al-Mansur, who had his own ideas and reasons for offering the post accused Abu Hanifa of lying.

"If I am lying," Abu Hanifa responded, "then my statement is doubly correct. How can you appoint a liar to the exalted post of a qadi?"

Incensed by this reply, al-Mansur had Abu Hanifa arrested, locked in prison and tortured. It was said that once in prison he was never fed nor cared for. Even in prison, the jurist continued to teach those who were permitted to visit him.

On 15 Rajab 150, (15 August 767) Abu Hanifa died in prison. The cause of his death is not clear, as it was said by some that Abu Hanifa issued a legal opinion for bearing arms against al-Mansur, so al-Mansur had him poisoned. His fellow prisoner and founder of Karaite Judaism, Anan ben David, was said to have received life-saving counsel from Abu Hanifa. It was said that so many people attended his funeral that the funeral service was repeated six times for the more than 50,000 people who had massed before he was actually buried. The historian al-Khatib said that for a full 20 days people performed funeral prayers for him. Many years later, the Abu Hanifa Mosque was built in the Adhamiyah neighbourhood of Baghdad. Abu Hanifa also supported the cause of Zayd ibn Ali and Ibrahim al Qamar, both Alid Zaydi Imams.

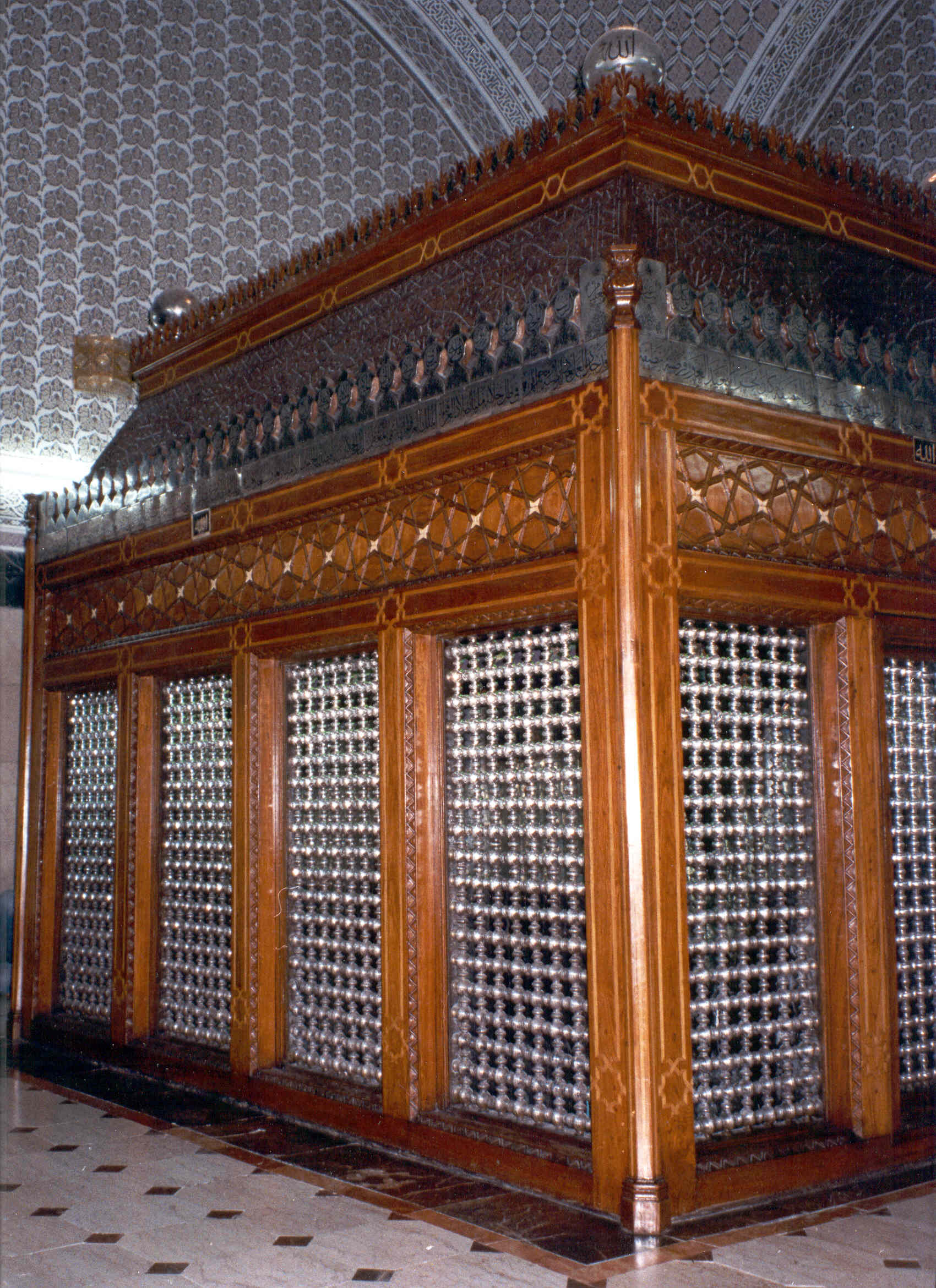
Tomb of Abu Hanifa at the Abu Hanifa Mosque, Iraq.

The structures of the tombs of Abu Hanifa and Abdul Qadir Gilani were destroyed by Shah Ismail of the Safavid Empire in 1508. In 1533, the Ottomans conquered Baghdad and rebuilt the tombs of Abu Hanifa and Abdul Qadir, as well as other Sunni sites.

== Sources and methodology ==
The sources from which Abu Hanifa derived Islamic law, in order of importance and preference, were: the Qur'an, the authentic narrations of the Muslim prophet Muhammad (known as hadith), consensus of the Muslim community (ijma'), analogical reasoning (qiyas), juristic discretion (istihsan) and the customs of the local population enacting Muslim laws ('urf). The development of analogical reason and the scope and boundaries by which it may be used was recognized by the majority of Muslim jurists, but its establishment as a legal tool was the result of the Hanafi school. While it was likely used by some of his teachers, Abu Hanifa is regarded by modern scholarship as the first to formally adopt and institute analogical reason as a part of Islamic law.

As the fourth Caliph, Ali had transferred the Islamic capital to Kufa, and many of the first generation of Muslims had settled there. The Hanafi school of law based many of its rulings on the prophetic tradition as transmitted by those first generation Muslims residing in Iraq. Thus, the Hanafi school came to be known as the Kufan or Iraqi school. Ali and Abdullah, son of Masud helped form much of the base of the school, as well as other personalities from the direct relatives (or ahl al-bayt) of Muḥammad from whom Abu Hanifa had studied such as Muhammad al-Baqir. Many jurists and historians had reportedly lived in Kufa, including one of Abu Hanifa's main teachers, Hammad ibn Abi Sulayman.

== Creed ==
The creed of Imam Abu Hanifa, is found in several short works attributed to him, such as al-Fiqh al-Akbar, al-Fiqh al-Absat, and Kitab al-Wasiyyah. These texts express his belief in the oneness of God, His transcendence beyond creation, and the affirmation of His attributes without asking how. Over time, his creed became a subject of debate among later scholars and different theological schools.

Abu hanifa was not an Athari in creed, rather, it is clear from Abu Hanifas writings that his beliefs are closely in line with the teachings later expressed by the Maturidi school, particularly in their understanding of concepts such as ta'wil (interpretive explanation), istiwa (God's rising over the Throne), kalam (rationalistic theology) and kalam lafzi (the spoken expression of God's speech), however, many modern-day Salafis continue to argue that Abu Hanifa followed an Athari approach to belief. They point to statements attributed to him such as, "God Almighty is called from above, not from below," and "Whoever says, 'I don't know whether Allah is in the heavens or on the earth,' has committed disbelief." They also cite his words: "Whatever God Almighty mentioned in the Qur'an of the face, hand, and soul, these are attributes of His without how. And it is not said that His hand is His power or His blessing, because that would invalidate the attribute, and this is the saying of the people of predestination and the Mut'azila. Rather, His hand is His attribute without how". Based on these phrases, Salafis argue that Abu Hanifa affirmed the divine attributes in their apparent form, without interpretation.

However, classical Hanafi scholars explained these statements differently. al‑Kawthari clarified that when Abu Hanifa said "God Almighty is called from above, not from below," he meant that the sky is simply the direction of supplication, not the dwelling place of God, who is exalted beyond place and direction. Imam Abu Al-layth Al-Samarqandi also explained that when Abu Hanifa said "Whoever says, I don't know whether Allah is in the heavens or on the earth has committed disbelief," this was because such a statement implies that God has a location, which is shirk. He added that if someone says, "I do not know whether the Throne is in the heavens or on the earth," it leads to the same mistake, because it indirectly suggests that God exists in a place.

As for Abu Hanifa's statement about the divine "hand," The Maturidi scholars understood this to mean that Abu Hanifa was refuting the Mutazila who denied God's attributes altogether, not that he intended to affirm a literal hand. According to the Maturidis, Abu Hanifa affirmed the wording of the Qur'an while maintaining that these attributes do not resemble those of creation. Thus, expressions like "hand" are affirmed as attributes mentioned in revelation but are understood in a way that befits God's majesty, without implying form, limb, or direction.

The Maturidis base their evidence on what Abu Hanifa said in his book al-Fiqh al-Akbar: "It is permissible to say 'in the presence of God, the Exalted and Majestic, without likening Him to anything or specifying how. God's nearness and distance are not determined by the length or shortness of the distance, but rather by the meaning of honor and humiliation." They explained that this statement clearly shows Abu Hanifa performed ta'wil (interpretation), because he interpreted nearness and distance as referring to status and honor rather than physical space, proving that he did not believe God occupies any location. This clearly proves that Abu Hanifah is not Athari, because unlike the Atharis who affirm divine attributes without interpretation, he employed ta’wil.

Abu Hanifa also said, "He is something unlike other things. The meaning of 'thing' is that it is constant without body, substance, accident, limit, opposite, equal, or likeness." This further supports the Maturidi understanding that Abu Hanifa affirmed God's existence as real, yet completely beyond physical form or comparison. By describing God as a "thing" only in the sense of existence and not in the sense of material being, Abu Hanifa made it clear that Allah cannot be confined by body, direction, or limitation in any way

Abu Hanifah, held a position on Istiwa' (Allah's "establishing Himself above the Throne") that aligns closely with the Maturidi and Ash'ari theological perspectives, distinguishing it from the views of later Salafi interpretations, In Al-Wasiyyah, Abu Hanifa said, "Two We recite that Allah is established on the throne, without Him having a need, or being established on the Throne. He is the Protector of the Throne and of other than that, without Him having any need, for if He was in need of anything, He would not have been able to bring this world into existence, nor what happens to it, like the creations. If He had the need to sit (julus) or to establish Himself (istiqrar), then before creating the Throne, where would He have been [that is, according to you?]. Allah is free from what the unjust people attribute to Him".

In Fiqh al-Akbar, Imam Abu Hanifah distinguishes between the eternal, uncreated speech of Allah (kalam nafsi) and the created, verbal forms of the Qur'an (kalam lafzi). He stated: "What God Almighty mentioned in the Qur'an, narrating the stories of Moses and other prophets, peace be upon them, and of Pharaoh and Satan, is all the speech of God Almighty, informing us about them. The speech of God Almighty is uncreated, while the speech of Moses and other created beings is created. The Qur'an is the speech of God Almighty, so it is eternal, not their speech. And Moses, peace be upon him, heard the speech of God Almighty, as in His statement, 'And God spoke to Moses directly.' God Almighty was the one who spoke to them, and He did not speak to Moses, peace be upon him. God Almighty was the Creator from eternity and did not create creation. When God spoke to Moses, He spoke to him with His speech, which is an attribute of His from eternity. All of His attributes are unlike the attributes of created beings. He knows, but not like our knowledge; He has power, but not like our power; He sees, but not like our vision; He speaks, but not like our speech; He hears, but not like our hearing. We speak with instruments and letters, but God Almighty speaks without instruments or letters. Letters are created, but God Almighty's speech is not created."

Abu Hanifah thus affirmed that the essence of Allah's speech (kalam nafsi) is uncreated and eternal, while its verbal expression (kalam lafzi)-such as writing, recitation, or sound-is created. This distinction aligns with Maturidi and Ash'ari theology and contrasts with Salafi positions that reject the created-verbal distinction.

In Al-Fiqh al-Absat, Abu Hanifas student Abu Muti reports the Imam's explanation regarding the question of "Where is Allah?": "I [Abu Muti] said: What if it was said: Where is Allah Almighty? He said: It would be said to him: Allah Almighty existed and there was no place before He created creation, and Allah Almighty existed and there was no place, no creation, and nothing." This statement emphasizes that Allah's existence is independent of time, space, and creation. Before anything was created, there was no "place" for Allah, yet He existed perfectly.

Muhammad al-Shaybani narrated that Abu Hanifa said: It is disliked for a person to say in his supplication: "I ask You by the place of might (ma'qid al-'izz) of Your Throne." Abd al-Hayy al-Lucknawi explained his statement, "and it is disliked," refers to two expressions: one from sitting (julūs) and one from holding/establishing (ma'qid). The first is disliked because it falsely ascribes sitting on the Throne to God, a view held by anthropomorphists. The second, common in supplication, is also disliked because it implies His glory is connected to the Throne, suggesting contingency if linked to something created

== Reception ==
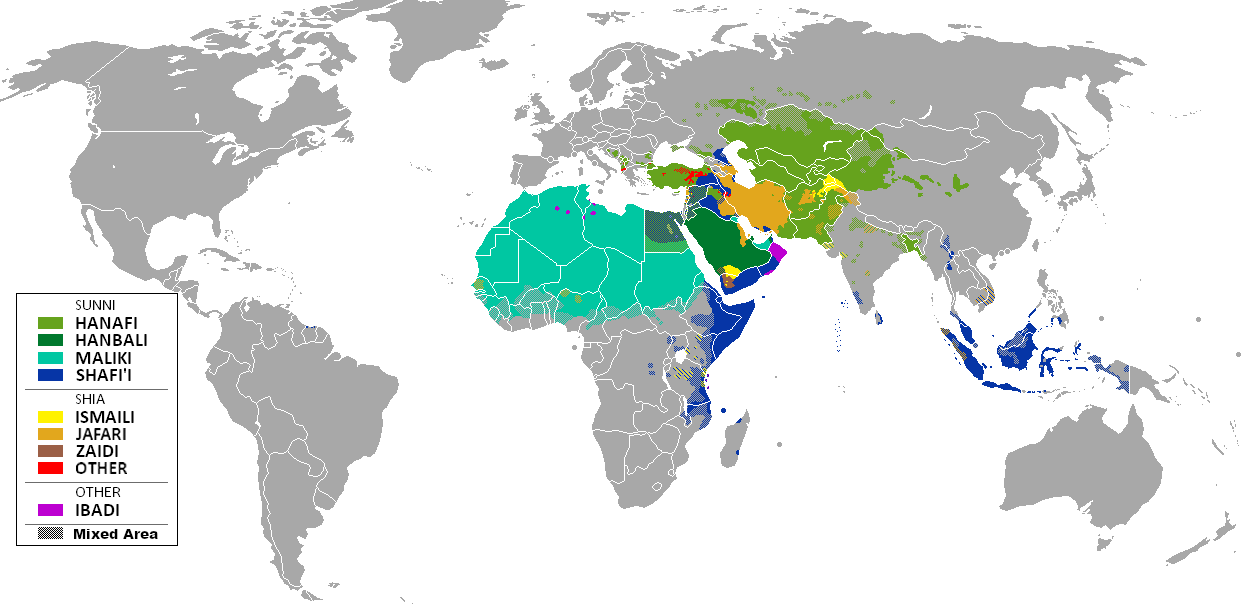
Map of the Muslim world. Hanafism (grass green) is the predominant school in Central and South Asia, the northern Middle East, and the Balkans.

=== Positive ===
He was highly regarded across the various fields of sacred knowledge and significantly influenced the development of Muslim theology. During his lifetime, he was acknowledged as a jurist of the highest calibre. The Shafi'i and prominent hadith scholar, Ibn Hajar al-Asqalani, stated that criticism of Abu Hanifa holds no significance, as figures like Abu Hanifa are "on a degree to which Allah - the Exalted - has raised them, in that they are followed and imitated."

Additionally, Abu Hamid al-Ghazali praised Abu Hanifah in his Ihya. In Ayn al-Ilm, an abridgement of the Ihya, the author is quoted as saying, "So the greatest scholar for us is Abu Hanifah" and that "even the Imam's counterparts have acknowledge his precedence in fiqh (jurisprudence)". Quoting this statement, Ibn Hajar al-Haythami has quoted Al-Shafi'i as saying, "In fiqh people are dependent on Abu Hanifa".

Ibn Taymiyya credited Abu Hanifa for his knowledge and addressed the accusations against him, stating, "There is no doubt regarding Imam Abu Hanifa's knowledge. People later attributed many lies to Imam Abu Hanifa, which were all untrue. The aim of such writings was to taint Imam Abu Hanifa". His students, Ibn Kathir and al-Dhahabi, held similar opinions about Abu Hanifa, extensively rebuking accusations against him and praising his contributions.

He received the honorific title al-Imam al-A'zam ("the highly venerated Imām") and his tomb, surmounted by a dome erected by admirers in 1066 is still a shrine for pilgrims. It was restored in 1535 by Suleiman the Magnificent after the Ottoman conquest of Baghdad.

=== Negative ===
Abu Hanifa is considered to have been criticized by several figures, such as Sufyān ibn ʿUyaynah, and al-Awzāʿī. According to some later sources, he was perceived by Ibn Abi Shaybah and Ibn Sa'd and to be a heretic and in opposition to the instructions of Muhammad, and al-Bukhari's teacher, al-Humaydi, was one of the first to pen a refutation of his Abu Hanifa's thought. The Zahiri scholar Ibn Hazm quoted Sufyan ibn `Uyaynah: "The affairs of men were in harmony until they were changed by Abù Hanìfa in Kùfa, al-Batti in Basra and Màlik in Medina". Early Muslim jurist Hammad ibn Salamah once related a story about a highway robber who posed as an old man to hide his identity; he then remarked that were the robber still alive he would be a follower of Abu Hanifa.

Additionally, Mahmud al-Ghazali (not to be confused with Abu Hamid) wrote the work al-Mankhul, which, according to Ibn Hajar al-Haythami, contains vile fanaticism, despising words and digraceful belittlement of Abu Hanifa. In response to it, al-Kardari authored, Al-Radd wa al-Intisar which Ibn Hajar states, "dispelled evil with evil".

=== Today ===
Today, the Hanafi school is followed by 45% of Muslims and Abu Hanifa is popularly known amongst Sunni Muslims as a man of the highest personal qualities: a performer of good works, remarkable for his self-denial, humble spirit, devotion and pious awe of God.

== Generational status ==
Abu Hanifa is regarded by some authorities as one of the tabi‘un, the generation after the sahaba, who were the companions of the Islamic prophet, Muhammad. This is based on reports that he met at least four sahaba including Anas ibn Malik, with some even reporting that he transmitted hadith from him and other companions of Muhammad. Others take the view that Abu Hanifa only saw around half a dozen companions, possibly at a young age, and did not directly narrate hadith from them.

Abu Hanifa was born at least 60 years after the death of Muhammad, but during the time of the first generation of Muslims, some of whom lived on until Abu Hanifa's youth. Anas ibn Malik, Muhammad's personal attendant, died in 93 AH and another companion, Abul Tufail Amir bin Wathilah, died in 100 AH, when Abu Hanifa was at least 20 years old. The author of al-Khairat al-Hisan collected information from books of biographies and cited the names of Muslims of the first generation from whom it was reported that the Abu Hanifa had transmitted hadith. He counted 16 of them, including Anas ibn Malik, Jabir ibn Abd-Allah and Sahl ibn Sa'd.

== Students and his personality ==
Yusuf ibn Abd al-Rahman al-Mizzi listed 97 hadith scholars who were his students. Most of them went on to be hadith scholars, and their narrated hadiths were compiled in the Sahih al-Bukhari, Sahih Muslim and other books of hadith. Imām Badr al-Din al-Ayni included another 260 students who studied hadith and fiqh with Abu Hanifa.

His most famous students were Imām Abu Yusuf, who served as the first chief justice in the Muslim world, and Imām Muhammad al-Shaybani, who was the teacher of the Shafi‘i school of jurisprudence founder, Imām Al-Shafi‘i. His other students included Abdullah ibn Mubarak and Fudhayl bin Iyaadh

=== Character and appearance ===
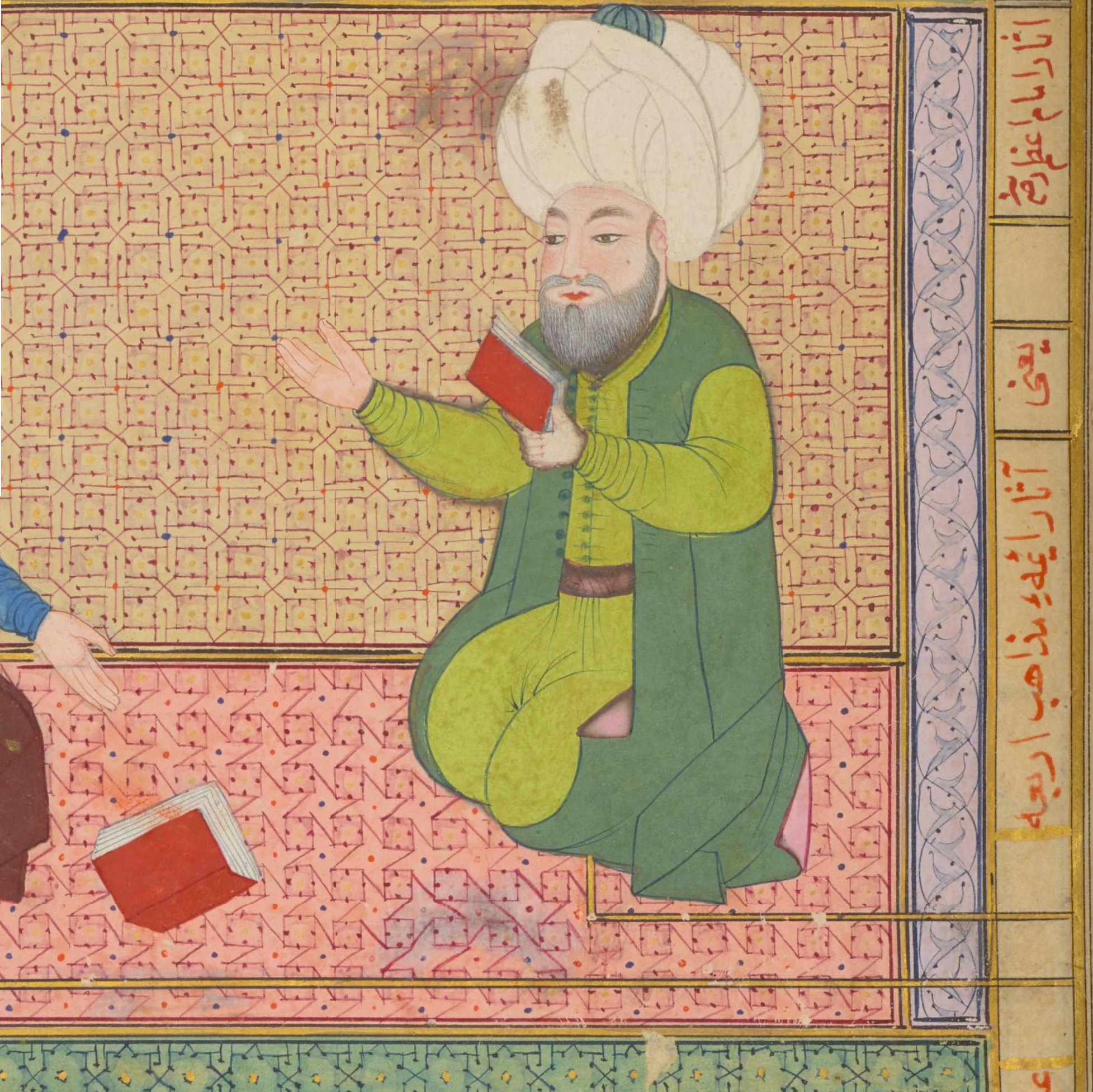
16th-century Ottoman miniature depicting Abu Hanifa

Al-Nadr ibn Muhammad recalled Abu Hanifa had "a beautiful face, beautiful clothing, and fragrant scent."

His student Abu Yusuf described him as "well-formed, from the best of people in appearance, most eloquent in speech, sweetest in tone, and clearest in expressing his thoughts."

His son Hammad described him as "very handsome, dark-skinned, having good posture, wearing much cologne, tall, not speaking except in reply to someone else, and not involving himself in what did not concern him."

Ibn al-Mubarak remarked he "never saw a man more revered in gatherings, nor better in character and forbearance, than Abu Hanifa."

== Connection with the family of Muhammad ==
Early Islamic scholars

Muhammad, The final Messenger of God (570–632) the Constitution of Medina, taught the Quran, and advised his companions
Abdullah ibn Masud (died 653) taught	Ali (607–661) fourth caliph taught	Aisha, Muhammad's wife and Abu Bakr's daughter taught	Abd Allah ibn Abbas (618–687) taught	Zayd ibn Thabit (610–660) taught	Umar (579–644) second caliph taught	Abu Hurairah (603–681) taught
Alqama ibn Qays (died 681) taught	Husayn ibn Ali (626–680) taught	Qasim ibn Muhammad ibn Abi Bakr (657–725) taught and raised by Aisha	Urwah ibn Zubayr (died 713) taught by Aisha, he then taught	Said ibn al-Musayyib (637–715) taught	Abdullah ibn Umar (614–693) taught	Abd Allah ibn al-Zubayr (624–692) taught by Aisha, he then taught
Ibrahim al-Nakha’i taught	Ali ibn Husayn Zayn al-Abidin (659–712) taught	Hisham ibn Urwah (667–772) taught	Ibn Shihab al-Zuhri (died 741) taught	Salim ibn Abd-Allah ibn Umar taught	Umar ibn Abdul Aziz (682–720) raised and taught by Abdullah ibn Umar
Hammad ibn Abi Sulayman taught	Muhammad al-Baqir (676–733) taught	Farwah bint al-Qasim Jafar's mother
Abu Hanifa (699–767) wrote Al Fiqh Al Akbar and Kitab Al-Athar, jurisprudence followed by Sunni, Sunni Sufi, Barelvi, Deobandi, Zaidiyyah and originally by the Fatimid and taught	Zayd ibn Ali (695–740)	Ja'far bin Muhammad Al-Baqir (702–765) Muhammad and Ali's great great grand son, jurisprudence followed by Shia, he taught	Malik ibn Anas (711–795) wrote Muwatta, jurisprudence from early Medina period now mostly followed by Maliki Sunnis in North Africa, and taught	Al-Waqidi (748–822) wrote history books like Kitab al-Tarikh wa al-Maghazi, student of Malik ibn Anas	Abu Muhammad Abdullah ibn Abdul Hakam (died 829) wrote biographies and history books, student of Malik ibn Anas
Abu Yusuf (729–798) wrote Usul al-fiqh	Muhammad al-Shaybani (749–805)	al-Shafi‘i (767–820) wrote Al-Risala, jurisprudence followed by Shafi'i Sunnis and Sufis, and taught	Ismail ibn Ibrahim	Ali ibn al-Madini (778–849) wrote The Book of Knowledge of the Companions	Ibn Hisham (died 833) wrote early history and As-Sirah an-Nabawiyyah, Muhammad's biography
Isma'il ibn Ja'far (719–775)	Musa al-Kadhim (745–799)	Ahmad ibn Hanbal (780–855) wrote Musnad Ahmad ibn Hanbal jurisprudence followed by Hanbali Sunnis and Sufis	Muhammad al-Bukhari (810–870) wrote Sahih al-Bukhari hadith books	Muslim ibn al-Hajjaj (815–875) wrote Sahih Muslim hadith books	Dawud al-Zahiri (815–883/4) founded the Zahiri school	Muhammad ibn Isa at-Tirmidhi (824–892) wrote Jami` at-Tirmidhi hadith books	Al-Baladhuri (died 892) wrote early history Futuh al-Buldan, Genealogies of the Nobles
Ibn Majah (824–887) wrote Sunan ibn Majah hadith book	Abu Dawood (817–889) wrote Sunan Abu Dawood Hadith Book
Muhammad ibn Ya'qub al-Kulayni (864- 941) wrote Kitab al-Kafi hadith book followed by Twelver Shia	Muhammad ibn Jarir al-Tabari (838–923) wrote History of the Prophets and Kings, Tafsir al-Tabari	Abu al-Hasan al-Ash'ari (874–936) wrote Maqālāt al-islāmīyīn, Kitāb al-luma, Kitāb al-ibāna 'an usūl al-diyāna
Ibn Babawayh (923–991) wrote Man La Yahduruhu al-Faqih jurisprudence followed by Twelver Shia	Sharif Razi (930–977) wrote Nahj al-Balagha followed by Twelver Shia	Nasir al-Din al-Tusi (1201–1274) wrote jurisprudence books followed by Ismaili and Twelver Shia	Al-Ghazali (1058–1111) wrote The Niche for Lights, The Incoherence of the Philosophers, The Alchemy of Happiness on Sufism	Rumi (1207–1273) wrote Masnavi, Diwan-e Shams-e Tabrizi on Sufism
Key: Some of Muhammad's Companions	Key: Taught in Medina	Key: Taught in Iraq	Key: Worked in Syria	Key: Travelled extensively collecting the sayings of Muhammad and compiled books of hadith	Key: Worked in Persia

As with Malik ibn Anas (who was a teacher of Imam al-Shafi'i, who in turn was a teacher of Sunni Imam Ahmad ibn Hanbal), Imam Abu Hanifa was a student of Ja'far al-Sadiq, who was a descendant of the Islamic nabi (prophet) Muhammad. Thus all of the four great Imams of Sunni fiqh are connected to Ja'far from the bayt (household) of Muhammad, whether directly or indirectly.

In one hadith, Abu Hanifa once said about Imam Ja'far: "I have not seen anyone with more knowledge than Ja'far ibn Muhammad." However, in another hadith, Abu Hanifa said: "I met with Zayd (Ja'far's uncle) and I never saw in his generation a person more knowledgeable, as quick a thinker, or more eloquent than he was."

== Opposition to anthropomorphism ==
Imam Abu Hanifa was quoted as saying that Jahm ibn Safwan (d. 128/745) went so far in his denial of anthropomorphism (Tashbih) as to declare that 'God is not something (Allah laysa bi shay')' whereas Muqatil ibn Sulayman (d. 150/767) likened God to His creatures.(needs better source)

Al-Khatib al-Baghdadi narrated in his Tarikh Baghdad (History of Baghdad) that Imam Abu Hanifa said:

Two groups of the worst of people are from Khurasan: the Jahmiyyah (followers of Jahm ibn Safwan) and the Mushabbihah (anthropomorphists), and he probably said (instead of Mushabbihah) "Muqatiliyyah" (followers of Muqatil ibn Sulayman).

== See also ==
- Ikhtilaf Abi Hanifa wa Ibn Abi Layla
- Sirat-un-Noman

== Citations ==
=== Sources ===
- Schacht, J. (1960). "Abu Hanifa". In Gibb, H. A. R.; Kramers, J. H.; Lévi-Provençal, E.; Schacht, J.; Lewis, B. & Pellat, Ch. (eds.). The Encyclopaedia of Islam, Second Edition. Volume I: A–B. Leiden: E. J. Brill. pp. 123–124. OCLC 495469456.
