= List of Hanafis =

Muslim scholars who followed the Hanafi Islamic maddhab

The following is the list of notable religious personalities who followed the Hanafi school of jurisprudence within Sunni Islam in chronological order:

== List of Hanafis ==
- Abu Hanifa (d. 767)
- Zufar ibn al-Hudhayl (d. 775)
- Ibn al-Mubarak (d. 797)
- Abu Yusuf (d. 798)
- Muhammad al-Shaybani (d. 805)
- Abu Sulayman al-Juzajani (d. 815)
- Abd al-Razzaq al-San'ani (d. 827)
- Yahya ibn Ma'in (d. 847)
- Al-Hassaf (d. 874)
- Al-Tahawi (d. 933)
- Abu Mansur al-Maturidi (d. 944)
- Hakim al-Shahid (d. 945)
- Al-Hakim al-Samarqandi (d. 953-956)
- Abu al-Layth al-Samarqandi (d. 983)
- Abu Zayd al-Dabusi (d. 1038)
- Ali al-Hujwiri (d. 1072)
- Al-Sarakhsi (d. 1090)
- Ali al-Balkhi (d. 1092)
- Abu al-Yusr al-Bazdawi (d. 1100)
- Yusuf Hamadani (d. 1141)
- Abu Hafs Umar al-Nasafi (d. 1142)
- Siraj al-Din al-Ushi (d. 1179)
- Fatima al-Samarqandi (d. 1185)
- Al-Kasani (d. 1191)
- Jamal al-Din al-Ghaznawi (d. 1196)
- Burhan al-Din al-Marghinani (d. 1197)
- Abu al-Thana' al-Lamishi (d. Beginning of the 12th century C.E)
- Mu'in al-Din Chishti (d. 1236)
- Rumi (d. 1273)
- Abu Tawwama (d. 1300)
- Fakhr al-Din al-Zayla'i (d. 1300)
- Abu al-Barakat al-Nasafi (d. 1310)
- Sadr al-Shari'a al-Asghar (d. 1346-47)
- Uthman Siraj ad-Din (d. 1357)
- Ala al-Haq (1301-1384)
- Akmal al-Din al-Babarti (d. 1384)
- Baha' al-Din Naqshband (d. 1389)
- Abu Tahir Multani (14-15th century)
- Nur Qutb Alam (d. 1416)
- Shams al-Din al-Fanari (d. 1431)
- 'Ala' al-Din al-Bukhari (d. 1438)
- Badr al-Din al-Ayni (d. 1451)
- Ibn Kemal (d. 1536)
- Ibrahim al-Halabi (d. 1549)
- Al-Tamartashi (d. 1596)
- Ali al-Qari (d. 1605)
- Ahmad Sirhindi (d. 1624)
- 'Abd al-Haqq al-Dehlawi (d. 1642)
- Khayr al-Din al-Ramli (d. 1671)
- Abd al-Ghani al-Nabulsi (d. 1731)
- Shah Waliullah Dehlawi (d. 1762)
- Shah Nuri Bengali (d. 1785)
- Syed Ahmad Barelvi (29 November 1786)
- Majduddin (d. 1813)
- Shah Abdul Aziz Dehlavi (d. 1824)
- Ibn Abidin (d. 1836)
- Haji Shariatullah (1781-1840)
- Mamluk Ali Nanautawi (1789-7 October 1851)
- Muhsinuddin Ahmad (1819-1862)
- Karamat Ali Jaunpuri (1800-1873)
- Najib Ali Choudhury (1870s)
- Naqi Ali Khan (1830-1880)
- Muhammad Qasim Nanautavi (1832-15 April 1880)
- Al-Maydani (d. 1881)
- Yaqub Nanautawi (1833-1884)
- Abd al-Hayy al-Lucknawi (d. 1886)
- Mahmud Deobandi (d. 1886)
- Hafiz Ahmad Jaunpuri (1834-1899)
- Abdul Wahid Bengali (1850-1905)
- Rashid Ahmad Gangohi (1826-1905)
- Abdul Hamid Madarshahi (1869-31 March 1920)
- Mahmud Hasan Deobandi (1851-30 November 1920)
- Abdul Awwal Jaunpuri (1867-18 June 1921)
- Ahmed Raza Khan Barelvi (1856-1921)
- Sufi Azizur Rahman (1862-1922)
- Aziz-ul-Rahman Usmani (d. 1928)
- Hafiz Muhammad Ahmad (1862-1930)
- Ibrahim Ali Tashna (1872-1931)
- Anwar Shah Kashmiri (16 November 1875 – 28 May 1933)
- Majid Ali Jaunpuri (d. 1935)
- Abdur Rab Jaunpuri (1875-June 1935)
- Mohammad Abu Bakr Siddique Pir-e-Furfura (15 April 1865 – 17 March 1943)
- Shukrullah Mubarakpuri (1895/1896-23 March 1942)
- Ibrahim Ujani (1863-1943)
- Habibullah Qurayshi (1865-1943)
- Ashraf Ali Thanwi (19 August 1863 – 4 July 1943)
- Ubaidullah Sindhi (10 March 1872 – 21 August 1944)
- Hamid Raza Khan (1875-1943)
- Asghar Hussain Deobandi (16 October 1877 – 8 January 1945)
- Muhammad Mian Mansoor Ansari (1884-11 January 1946)
- Muhammad Sahool Bhagalpuri (d. 1948)
- Shabbir Ahmad Usmani (11 October 1887 – 13 December 1949)
- Murtaza Hasan Chandpuri (1868-1951)
- Nesaruddin Ahmad (1873-1952)
- Muhammad Zahid al-Kawthari (1879-1952)
- Kifayatullah Dehlawi (1875-31 December 1952)
- Izaz Ali Amrohi (November 1882 – 1955)
- Manazir Ahsan Gilani (1 October 1892 – 5 June 1956)
- Hussain Ahmad Madani (6 October 1879 – 5 December 1957)
- Ahmed Ali Enayetpuri (1898-1959)
- Azizul Haq (1903-1961)
- Shah Ahmad Hasan (1882-1967)
- Syed Fakhruddin Ahmad (1889-1972)
- Mustafa Raza Khan Qadri (1892-1981)
- Maqsudullah (1883-1961)
- Ibrahim Raza Khan (1907-1965)
- Shamsul Haque Faridpuri (1896-1969)
- Mushahid Ahmad Bayampuri (1907-1971)
- Abdur Rahman Kashgari (d. 1971)
- Deen Muhammad Khan (1900-1974)
- Amimul Ehsan Barkati (1911-1974)
- Muhammad Miyan Deobandi (1903-1975)
- Muhammad Faizullah (1890-1976)
- Abdul Wahhab Pirji (1890-29 September 1976)
- Athar Ali Bengali (1891-6 October 1976)
- Abdul Hamid Khan Bhashani (12 December 1880 – 17 November 1976)
- Muhammad Shafi (25 January 1897 – 6 October 1976)
- Syed Muhammad Ishaq (1915-1977)
- Mufti Mahmud (1919-1980)
- Zakariyya Kandhlawi (2 February 1898 – 24 May 1982)
- Shah Abdul Wahhab (1894-2 June 1982)
- Belayet Hossain Birbhumi (1887—1984)
- Ibrahim Ali Chatuli (1894-1984)
- Faiz-ul Hassan Shah (1911-23 February 1984)
- Saeed Ahmad Akbarabadi (1908-1985)
- Harun Babunagari (1902-1986)
- Abdur Rashid Tarkabagish (1900-1986)
- Abdur Rahim Firozpuri (1918-1987)
- Muhammadullah Hafezzi (1895-1987)
- Shamsul Huda Panchbagi (1897-1988)
- Uzair Gul Peshawari (d. 17 November 1989)
- Abdul Jalil Choudhury (1925-1989)
- Abu Zafar Mohammad Saleh (1915-1990)
- Abdul Matin Chowdhury (1915-1990)
- Muhammad Taqi Amini (5 May 1926 – 21 January 1991)
- Abul Hasan Jashori (1918 – 8 July 1993)
- Muhammad Ayyub Ali (1919-1995)
- Abdul Haque Faridi (25 May 1903 – 5 February 1996)
- Mahmood Hasan Gangohi (1907-2 September 1996)
- Shamsuddin Qasemi (5 March 1935 – 19 October 1996)
- ʿAbd al-Fattah Abu Ghuddah (9 May 1917 – 16 February 1997)
- Shah Sultan Ahmad Nanupuri (26 June 1914 – 16 August 1997)
- Mawlana Abdullah Ghazi (1935-1998)
- Abul Hasan Ali Hasani Nadwi (5 December 1913 – 31 December 1999)
- Aashiq Ilahi Bulandshahri (1925-2002)
- Nur Uddin Gohorpuri (1924-2005)
- Ashraf Ali Bishwanathi (1928-2005)
- Abrarul Haq Haqqi (20 December 1920 – 17 May 2006)
- Syed Fazlul Karim (1935-26 November 2006)
- Ubaidul Haq (1928-2007)
- Obaidul Haque Wazirpuri (1934-2008)
- Abdul Latif Chowdhury Fultali (1913-2008)
- Anzar Shah Kashmiri (1927-2008)
- Naseeruddin Naseer Gilani (1949-2009)
- Abu Saeed Muhammad Omar Ali (1 October 1945 – 14 August 2010)
- Zafeeruddin Miftahi (7 March 1926 – 31 March 2011)
- Azizul Haque (1919-2012)
- Abdus Sattar Akon (1929-2012)
- Fazlul Haque Amini (1945-12 December 2012)
- Qazi Mu'tasim Billah (15 June 1933 – 15 July 2013)
- Nurul Islam Farooqi (1959-2014)
- Abdur Rahman (scholar) (1920-2015)
- Muhiuddin Khan (1935-2016)
- Abdul Jabbar Jahanabadi (1937-2016)
- Abdul Haq Azmi (1928-30 December 2016)
- Yunus Jaunpuri (1937-2017)
- Muhammad Salim Qasmi (8 January 1926 – 14 April 2018)
- Akhtar Raza Khan (1943-2018)
- Tafazzul Haque Habiganji (1938-2020)
- Saeed Ahmad Palanpuri (1940-19 May 2020)
- Salman Mazahiri (10 October 1946 – 20 July 2020)
- Muhammad Adil Khan (d. 10 October 2020)
- Muhammad Abdus Sobhan (1936-2020)
- Shah Ahmad Shafi (1945-2020)
- Nur Hossain Kasemi (1945-2020)
- Nizamuddin Asir Adrawi (1926-2021)
- Noor Alam Khalil Amini (18 December 1952 – 3 May 2021)
- Muhammad Wakkas (1952-2021)
- Junaid Babunagari (1953-2021)
- Abdus Salam Chatgami (1943-2021)
- Nurul Islam Jihadi (1916-2021)
- Abdul Halim Bukhari (1945-2022)
- Muhammad Sadik Muhammad Yusuf (15 April 1952 – 10 March 2015)
- Habibur Rahman Azami (1941–12 May 2021)
- Muhammad Iqbal (1877–1938)
- Qamruddin Ahmad Gorakhpuri (1938-2024)
- Mahmud Shukri al-Alusi (1856-1924)

=== Contemporary Hanafi scholars ===
- Salah Abu al-Haj (born 1974)
- Mahmudul Hasan (born 1950)
- Syed Rezaul Karim (born 1971)
- Mufti Rafi Usmani (born 1936)
- Nematullah Azami (born 1936)
- Muhibbullah Babunagari
- Taqi Usmani
- Raza Saqib
- Abul Qasim Nomani (born 1947)
- Salman Husaini Nadwi (born 1954)
- Muhammad Sufyan Qasmi (born 1954)
- Khalid Saifullah Rahmani (born 1956)
- Sameeruddin Qasmi (born 1950)
- Salman Mansoorpuri (born 1967)
- Salman Bijnori (born 1969)
- Rawil Gaynetdin (born 1959)
- Mustafa Cerić (born 1952)
- Husein Kavazović (born 1964)
- Muhammad Saad Kandhlawi (born 1965)
- Shefqet Krasniqi (born 1966)
- Mahfuzul Haque (born 1969)
- Abu Yusuf Riyadh ul Haq (born 1971)
- Abdur Rahman ibn Yusuf Mangera (born 1974)
- Mufti Ebrahim Desai
- Mamunul Haque (born 1973)
- Fuzail Ahmad Nasiri (born 1978)
- Yusuf Ziya Kavakçı
- Muhammad ibn Adam Al-Kawthari
- Zulfiqar Ahmad Naqshbandi (born 1953)
- Ilyas Qadri (born 1950)
- A F M Khalid Hossain
- Shu'ayb al-Arna'ut
- Muhammad Tahir-ul-Qadri (born 1951)
- Tariq Jamil (born 1953)
- Faraz Rabbani
- Yunus Jaunpuri
- Abd al-Fattah Abu Ghudda
- Muhammad 'Awwamah
- al-Kawthari
- Wahbi Sulayman Ghawji
- Hifzur Rahman
- Yasir Nadeem al Wajidi (born 1982)
- Omar Abedeen Qasmi Madani (born 1981)
- Hibatullah Akhundzada (born 1966)
- Abdul Hakim Haqqani (born 1967)
- Mullah Omar (1959-2013)
- Kamil Samigullin (born 1985)
- Khandaker Abdullah Jahangir
