= Muhammad 'Abid al-Sindi =

Hanafi jurist and hadith expert (1776–1841)

Muhammad 'Abid al-Sindi محمد عابد السندي
- Title: Shaykh al-Islam

Personal life
- Born: 1190 AH (1776 CE) Sehwan, Sindh
- Died: 1257 AH (1841 CE) Al-Medina, Ottoman Empire
- Region: Ottoman Empire
- Main interest(s): Hadith, Fiqh (Islamic jurisprudence), Usul al-Fiqh (principles of jurisprudence), Sufism, Aqidah, Tafsir
- Notable work: Al-Mawahib al-Latifah

Religious life
- Religion: Islam
- Denomination: Sunni
- Jurisprudence: Hanafi
- Creed: Maturidi
- Movement: Naqshbandi

Muslim leader
- Influenced by: Abu Hanifa Al-Shafi'i Mulla 'Ali al-Qari

Muhammad 'Abid al-Sindi al-Ansari (Arabic: محمد عابد السندي الأنصاري), was a Hanafi jurist (faqih), hadith expert (muhaddith), judge (qadi), and the shaykh of the 'ulama of his time in the city of Madina during the Ottoman Caliphate.

Al-Sindi followed the Naqshbandi Sufi path. He was appointed qadi of Zabid. In 1232 AH he was appointed the leader of the scholars of Madina by the ruler of Egypt, Muhammad 'Ali Pasha. He was known as Shaykh al-Islam.

== Name ==
His full name was Muhammad 'Abid b. Ahmad 'Ali b. Muhammad Murad Ya'qub al-Hafiz b. Muhamud b. 'Abd al-Rahman, al-Sindi al-Ansari al-Khazraji al-Madani al-Hanafi al-Naqshbandi.

== Life ==
He was born in 1190 AH / 1776 CE at Sehwan, a village in Sind on the bank of the Indus, north of Hyderabad. His lineage reaches back to Abu Ayyub al-Ansari. Educated at Zabid, he married a daughter of the then minister of San'a' and was appointed by the Imam of al-Yaman as his ambassador to Egypt. He then had a sojourn to his native land where after staying for a while, he left for al-Hijaz and was appointed by the Egyptian government as the chief of the 'ulama of al-Madina. He died at al-Madina, and was buried in al-Baqi' in Rabi' I (Rabi' al-Awwal), 1257 AH / April 1841 CE.

== Books ==
Al-Sindi has a number of works to his credit which include:

- Al-Mawahib al-Latifa 'ala Musnad al-Imam Abi Hanifa (Arabic: المواهب اللطيفة على مسند الإمام أبي حنيفة).
- Tawali' al-Anwar 'ala al-Durr al-Mukhtar (Arabic: طوالع الأنوار على الدر المختار), gloss by al-Sindi on al-Durr al-Mukhtar, which is a commentary by al-Haskafi (d. 1088/1677) on Tanwir al-Absar wa-Jami' al-Bihar by al-Timirtashi (d. 1004/1595).
- Sharh Taysir al-Wusul (Arabic: شرح تيسير الوصول) by Ibn Diba' al-Shaybani (d. 944/1537); he writes a commentary on over 1600 hadith.
- Sharh Bulugh al-Maram (Arabic: شرح بلوغ المرام) by Ibn Hajar al-'Asqalani.
- Tartib Musnad al-Imam al-Shafi'i (Arabic: ترتيب مسند الإمام الشافعي).
- Al-Tawassul wa-Ahkamuh wa-Anwa'uh (Arabic: التوسل وأحكامه وأنواعه).

== See also ==
- Ahmad Zayni Dahlan
- Sulayman ibn Abd al-Wahhab
- List of Hanafis
- List of Sufis
- List of Muslim theologians
- List of Ash'aris and Maturidis
