= Abd al-Fattah Abu Ghudda =

Syrian scholar and former Muslim Brotherhood head (1917–1997)

ʿAbd al-Fattah Abu Ghuddah Al Khaldi
- عبد الفتاح بن محمد بن بشير بن حسن أبوغدة الخالدي

Supreme Guide of the Syrian Muslim Brotherhood
- In office 1973–1976
- Preceded by: Issam al-Attar
- Succeeded by: Adnan Saad al-Din

Personal details
- Born: ʿAbdul-Fattah; 9 May 1917 Aleppo, Aleppo Vilayet, Ottoman Empire
- Died: 16 February 1997 (aged 79) Riyadh, Saudi Arabia
- Resting place: Jannat Al-Baqi', Medina
- Citizenship: Syrian
- Relations: Dr. 'Abdu-s-Sattaar Aboo Ghuddah (paternal nephew)
- Children: 11
- Profession: Teacher, Sunni Islamic scholar

Abd al-Fattah Abu Ghuddah (Arabic: عبد الفتاح بن محمد بن بشير بن حسن أبوغدة الخالدي, romanized: ʿAbd al-Fattāḥ ibn Muḥammad ibn Bashīr ibn Ḥasan Abū Ghuddah Al Khaldi) (9 May 1917 – 16 February 1997) was a Syrian Muslim Brotherhood leader and Sunni Hanafi Muslim scholar. He was born in 1917 in Aleppo. He was the third Supreme Guide of the Syrian Muslim Brotherhood, only in organisation while he himself did not ascribe to any of the ikhwani beliefs, taking over from Issam al-Attar in 1973.

== Early life and education ==
Abu Ghuddah was born and raised in Aleppo, studying at the Academy of Islamic Studies in Aleppo and later received advanced training in psychology and education at al-Azhar University in Cairo, Egypt. His father, Muhammad Ansari, was known to be a pious man, and was a businessman in the textile industry. Muhammad's father, Bashir Ansari, was one of the biggest textile traders in Aleppo, and his family line is claimed to be traced back to Khalid ibn al-Walid, one of the companions of the Islamic prophet Muhammad. He manifested differences in views with al-Dhahabi and Ibn Taymiyyah.

== Notable students ==
- Mohammad Abu Al Fath Al Beyanouni
- Muhammad 'Awwamah
- Taqi Usmani
- Salman Hussaini Nadwi
- Muhammad Abdul Malek

== Muslim Brotherhood ==
Abu Ghuddah lived in Cairo between 1944 and 1950, during which time he met Hassan al-Banna, the Founder and First General Guide of the Muslim Brotherhood. Abu Ghuddah joined the Muslim Brotherhood under the auspices of al-Banna and became a member of the Syrian Muslim Brotherhood upon his return to Syria in 1950. He rose to prominence in Islamic circles in Aleppo, and became an instructor at his former school, Academy of Islamic Studies. In 1960 he became an instructor of theology at Damascus University along with the principles of Fiqh, Hanafi Fiqh, and Comparative Fiqh. Abu Ghuddah stood for election in the 1961 parliamentary election, and was later appointed as the Mufti of Aleppo by President Nazim al-Kudsi.

Abu Ghuddah was critical of the often-authoritarian policies of Issam al-Attar, the Supreme Guide of the Syrian Muslim Brotherhood, who he claimed was unrestrained in his power and never consulted others on political affairs. Al-Attar stepped down from the party leadership in 1962 and Abu Ghuddah replaced him as Supreme Guide of the Syrian Muslim Brotherhood.

Abu Ghuddah was critical of the 1966 Syrian coup d'état which brought Salah Jadid to the Presidency. Abu Ghuddah used his position to rally scholars, whom he encouraged to boycott the state and voice opposition to Jadid's violent policies. Abu Ghuddah also appeared at Friday sermons in Aleppo and encouraged Syrians to oppose Jadid's rule. Abu Ghuddah opposed Jadid's rule extensively, and claimed Jadid did not represent the Syrian people. As a result of Abu Ghuddah's activities in the opposition he was arrested and imprisoned in the remote Tadmor Prison, where he was kept for 11 months, before being released along with all other political prisoners in 1967 as part of an amnesty following the Six-Day War with Israel.

== Exile and death ==
Abu Ghuddah left Syria and went into exile in Saudi Arabia, where he taught and researched a variety of Islamic sciences at the Faculty of Islamic Sciences at Riyadh University, and guest lectured at the Omdurman Institute in Sudan. During the early years of his exile he continued to actively opposed the Syrian government during his exile, and served as the Inspector General of the Syrian Muslim Brotherhood from 1976 to 1983, leading the Islamic uprising in Syria. Following the failure of the uprising Abu Ghuddah abandoned his political career and turned to academia. He taught at the University of Jeddah and published numerous works on theology. He had his personal library, which he greatly missed during his exile as he was a serious scholar who loved reading, writing, researching, and collecting books.

Abu Ghuddah later returned to Syria in December 1995 under an arrangement with the Syrian government whereby he could return to Aleppo as long as he refrained from politics and focus on academia and religion. During his stay in his native land, he suffered a heart attack and developed soreness of the eyes. In mid-1996 he returned to Riyadh, Saudi Arabia for medical treatment. He began to bleed from the eyes and the condition got worse despite treatment until he lost consciousness and died in Riyadh on 16 February 1997 (9 Shawwal 1417 AH) at dawn. Mufti Taqi Usmani was greatly saddened when he received the news of the demise of his beloved teacher and Shaikh. He authored an obituary in Abu Ghuddah's memory. Hafez al-Assad, the Syrian President, promptly sent condolences to the family. An official delegation, including the Minister of the Awqaf, the Governor of Aleppo, and the Chief of the Aleppo Police Department visited the family, and delivered condolences from Hafez al-Assad. Assad also offered the use of his personal plane for transporting Abu Ghuddah's body back to Syria, although he was ultimately buried at Al-Baqi Cemetery in Medina.

== Works ==
ِAbu Ghuddah was a prolific editor and author, having published more than 70 works over the course of his life. Many of the critical editions he produced of classical Islamic texts on legal and hadith sciences have become the standard editions distributed in seminaries and universities.

=== Critical Editions ===
1. al-Raf‘ wa-l-takmīl fi-l-jarḥ wa-l-ta‘dīl (Arabic: الرفع والتكميل في الجرح والتعديل) by Abd Al-Hayy al-Lucknawi, a primer on the hadith sciences subdiscipline of biographic evaluation
2. al-Ajwibah al-fāḍilah li-l-as’ilah al-‘ashrah al-kāmilah (Arabic: الأجوبة الفاضلة للأسئلة العشرة الكاملة) by Abd Al-Hayy al-Lucknawi
3. Iqāmat al-ḥujjah ‘alā anna al-ikthār fī al-ta‘abbud laysa bi-bid‘ah (Arabic: إقامة الحجة على أن الإكثار في التعبد ليس ببدعة) by Abd Al-Hayy al-Lucknawi
4. Risālat al-mustarshidīn (Arabic: رسالة المسترشدين) by al-Harith al-Muhasibi, an early work on Islamic spirituality
5. al-Taṣrīḥ bi-mā tawātara fī nuzūl al-masīḥ (Arabic: التصريح بما تواتر في نزول المسيح) by Anwar Shah Kashmiri, a work on Islamic Christology focusing specifically on the belief in the Second Coming
6. al-Iḥkām fī tamyīz al-fatāwā ‘an al-aḥkām wa-taṣarrufāt al-qāḍī wa-l-imām (Arabic: الإحكام في تمييز الفتاوى عن الأحكام وتصرفات القاضي والإمام) by Shihab al-Din al-Qarafi
7. Fatḥ bāb al-‘Ināyah bi-sharḥ kitab al-nuqāyah (Arabic: فتح باب العناية بشرح كتاب النقاية) by Ali al-Qari, a commentary on Sadr al-Shari'a al-Asghar's abridgement of Kitāb al-Wiqāyah, one of the four primary primers of the post-classical Hanafi school of jurisprudence
8. al-Manār al-munīf fī al-ṣaḥīḥ wa-l-ḍa‘īf (Arabic: المنار المنيف في الصحيح والضعيف) by Ibn Qayyim al-Jawziyya
9. al-Maṣnū‘ fī ma‘rifat al-ḥadīth al-mawḍū‘ (Arabic: المصنوع في معرفة الحديث الموضوع) by Ali al-Qari
10. Fiqh ahl al-‘irāq wa-ḥadīthuhum (Arabic: فقه أهل العراق وحديثهم) by Muhammad Zahid al‑Kawthari
11. Khulāṣat tahdhīb tahdhīb al-kamāl fī asmā’ al-rijāl (Arabic: خلاصة تذهيب تهذيب الكمال في أسماء الرجال) by Ṣafī Al-Dīn al-Khazrajī
12. Qawā‘id fī ‘ulūm al-ḥadīth (Arabic: قواعد في علوم الحديث) by Zafar Ahmad Usmani

=== Authored Works ===
1. Mas’alat khalq al-qur’ān wa-atharuhā (Arabic: مسألة خلق القرآن وأثرها), a work on the effect of the early theological controversy surrounding Quranic createdness on various hadith sciences
2. Ṣafaḥāt min ṣabr al-‘ulamā’ ‘alā shadā’id al-‘ilm wa-l-taḥsīl (Arabic: صفحات من صبر العلماء على شدائد العلم والتحصيل)
3. Zafar al-Amaanee bi-Sharh Mukhtasar as-Sayyid ash-Shareef al-Jurjaanee (fee Mustalah al-Hadeeth) by Shaykh Abu-l-Hasanaat 'Abdu-l-Hayy al-Lacknawi
4. Sibaahatu-l-Fikr fi-l-Jahri bi-dh-Dhikr by Shaykh Abu-l-Hasanaat 'Abdu-l-Hayy al-Lacknawi
5. Makaanatul-Imaam Abee Haneefah fi-l-Hadeeth by Shaikh 'Abdu-r-Rasheed an-Nu'maanee
6. Al-Imaam Ibn Maajah wa Kitaabuhu-s-Sunan by Shaikh 'Abdu-r-Rasheed an-Nu'maanee
7. Tasheehu-l-Kutubi wa Sawna'u-l-Fahaarisi-l-Mu'jamah wa Kaifiyah wa Dawbbtwu-l-Kitaabi wa Saebaqu-l-Mulimaini-l-Furawnji fee Dhalik by 'Allamah Ahmad Shakir
8. Qawfwu-l-Athari fee Sawfwi 'Uloomi-l-Athar by Razi Uddeen Muhammad ibn Ibraheem al-Halabi
9. Bulaghawtu-r-Rawybb fee Mustalah Athaari-l-Habeeb by Muhammad Murtazaa al-Husaini az-Zabeedi
10. Qaaw'idatu fi-l-Jarh wa-t-Ta'deel by Taj al-Din al-Subki in (Raawbi'u Rawsaa'il fee 'Uloomi-l-Hadeeth)
11. Qaaw'idatu fi-l-Mu'arrikheen by Taj al-Din al-Subki in (Raawbi'u Rawsaa'il fee 'Uloomi-l-Hadeeth)
12. Al-Mutakallimoona fi-r-Rijaal by Muhammad ibn 'Abdu-r-Rahman as-Sikhaawi in (Raawbi'u Rawsaa'il fee 'Uloomi-l-Hadeeth)
13. Qasidah 'Unwaani-l-Hikam by Abu al-Fath al-Busti
14. Kashfu-l-Iltibaas 'Ammaa Aurawdatu-l-Imaam Bukhaawree Ba'dwu li-nn-Naas by 'Abdu-l-Ghani al-Ghunaimi al-Maidaani ad-Dimashqi
15. At-Tarqeem wa 'Alaamaatuhu fi-l-Lughaawti-l-'Arabiyyah by Adeebu-l-Kabeer Ahmad Zaki Baasa
16. At-Tibbyaanu li-Ba'dwi-l-Mabaahitha Muta'alliqawti bi-l-Qur'aani 'alaa Tawreequ-l-Itqaawn by Tahir al-Jazaa'iri ad-Dimashqi
17. Tawjeehu-nn-Nazawri ila-l-Uswooli-l-Athar by Tahir al-Jazaa'iri ad-Dimashqi

== See also ==
- Muslim Brotherhood of Syria
