= Burhan al-Din =

Burhan ad-din and Burhan al-Din (Arabic: برھان الدین) is a male Muslim name, formed from the elements Burhan and ad-Din, meaning proof of the religion. It may refer to:

== As a given name ==
- Burhan al-Din al-Marghinani (1135–1197), Islamic scholar
- Burhan al-Din al-Zarnuji (died 1223), Islamic scholar
- Burhanuddin Gharib (died 1344), Indian saint of the Chishti Order
- Burhan-ud-din Kermani (15th century), Persian physician
- Tuan Burhanudeen Jayah (1890–1960), Sri Lankan educationalist, politician, and diplomat
- Prince Burhan-ud-Din of Chitral (1915–1996), officer of the Indian National Army
- Burhanuddin Harahap (1917–1987), Prime Minister of Indonesia
- Burhanuddin Rabbani (1940–2011), President of Afghanistan
- Burhan al-Din al-Marghinani, Islamic scholar
- Burhanettin Kaymak (born 1973), German footballer

== As a surname ==
- Ghazi Burhanuddin, first Muslim resident of Sylhet
- Kadi Burhan al-Din (died 1398), vizier and atabeg to the Eretnid rulers of Anatolia
- Mohammed Burhanuddin (1915–2014), Indian, Dai of the Dawoodi Bohras
