= Abu al-Barakat al-Nasafi =

Central Asian Hanafi scholar and theologian (died 1310)

Imam Abu al-Barakat al-Nasafi
- أبو البركات النسفي
- Title: Hafiz al-Din ("Protector of the Religion")

Personal life
- Born: Izaj, or Nasaf
- Died: 710 A.H. = 1310 A.D. Died in Baghdad, and was buried in Izaj
- Era: Islamic Golden Age
- Region: Ma Wara' al-Nahr (the land which lies beyond the river), Transoxiana (Central Asia)
- Main interest(s): Tafsir, Fiqh (Islamic jurisprudence), Usul al-Fiqh, Usul al-Din, Aqidah, Kalam (Islamic theology), Tawhid, Hadith studies
- Notable work: Madarik al-Tanzil wa Haqa'iq al-Ta'wil

Religious life
- Religion: Islam
- Denomination: Sunni
- Jurisprudence: Hanafi
- Creed: Maturidi

Muslim leader
- Influenced by: Abu Hanifa Abu Mansur al-Maturidi Najm al-Din 'Umar al-Nasafi Al-Sarakhsi Al-Baydawi
- Influenced: Akmal al-Din al-Babarti Fakhr al-Din al-Zayla'i Ibn Nujaym Ibn 'Abidin Badr al-Din al-'Ayni 'Abd al-Hakim al-Afghani

Abu al-Barakat al-Nasafi (Arabic: أبو البركات النسفي), was an eminent Hanafi scholar, Qur'an exegete (mufassir), and a Maturidi theologian. He is perhaps best known for his Tafsir Madarik al-Tanzil wa Haqa'iq al-Ta'wil (Arabic: مدارك التنزيل وحقائق التأويل, lit. 'The Perceptions of Revelation and the Truths of Interpretation').

He was one of the foremost figures of the classical period of Hanafi jurisprudence and one of the major scholars of the Maturidi school in the Sunni tradition, which developed in parallel with Hanafiyya, who made a tremendous contribution in the field of Islamic sciences in Central Asia, especially to the dissemination of the Hanafian order and teachings of the Maturidi school in the Islamic world and left a great amount of scientific heritage.

He successfully worked in different branches of Islamic studies such as tafsir, fiqh and kalam. For his contribution to Islamic sciences he was given an honorable title of "Hafiz al-Din" (Protector of the Religion).

He was praised by 'Abd al-Hayy al-Lucknawi, and Ibn Hajar al-'Asqalani described him as the "'Allamah of the World", and Ibn Taghribirdi gave him the honorable title of "Shaykh al-Islam".

Some scholars ranked him as mujtahid in Hanafi fiqh.

== Name ==
Abu al-Barakat 'Abd Allah b. Ahmad b. Mahmud Hafiz al-Din al-Nasafi (an ascription to the city of Nasaf in Transoxania, modern Qarshi in southern Uzbekistan).

== Birth ==
His birth date is unknown, but he was born in Izaj. It was also said that he was born in Nasaf in Sogdiana (present-day Southern Uzbekistan and Western Tajikistan).

== Teachers ==
He studied under some teachers and masters, such as:

- Shams al-A'imma Abu al-Wajd Muhammad b. 'Abd al-Sattar b. Muhammad al'Imādi al-Kardari (d. 642 AH).
- Hamid al-Din 'Ali b. Muhammad b. 'Ali al-Darir al-Ramushi al-Bukhari (d. 666 AH).
- Badr al-Din Jawahir-Zadah Muhammad b. Mahmud b. 'Abdelkarim (d. 651 AH).

== Students ==
His pupils were:

- Muzaffar al-Din ibn al-Sa'ati, author of the Majma' al-Bahrain wa Multaqa al-Nayyirain (d. 694/1294 — 1295).
- Husam al-Din Husayn b. 'Ali al-Sighnaqi, a commentator on the al-Hidaya (d. 714/1314 — 1315).

== Books ==
Some of his most celebrated works are:

- Madarik al-Tanzil wa Haqa'iq al-Ta'wil (Arabic: مدارك التنزيل وحقائق التأويل, lit. 'The Perceptions of Revelation and the Truths of Interpretation').
- Kanz al-Daqa'iq (Arabic: كنز الدقائق, lit. 'The Treasure of Exactitudes') is a summary of Islamic legal prescriptions according to the Hanifite school of sharia law.
- Manar al-Anwar fi Usul al-Fiqh (Arabic: منار الأنوار في أصول الفقه, lit. 'The Lighthouse casting Light on the Principles of Jurisprudence').
- 'Umdat al-Aqa'id (Arabic: عمدة العقائد, lit. 'Basic Pillar of the Creeds'). A treatise on kalam (Islamic theology), expounding Sunni dogmas, with a refutation of the doctrines of the Shi'a and other sects. The work was edited by the English orientalist William Cureton and published in London in 1843, under the title of 'Umdat 'Aqidat Ahl al-Sunnah wa al-Jama'ah (Arabic: عمدة عقيدة أهل السنة والجماعة, lit. 'Pillar of the Creed of the Sunnites') he also wrote comments to this book and called it Al-I'timad (Arabic: الاعتماد, lit. 'The Reliance').
- Al-Musaffa fi Sharh al-Manzuma al-Nasafiyya fi al-Khilafiyyat (Arabic: المصفى في شرح المنظومة النسفية في الخلافيات, lit. 'Exposition of al-Nasafi's Didactic Poem on the Divergences'). A commentary work on Abu Hafs 'Umar al-Nasafi's al-Manzumah fi al-Khilafiyyat which is a book on controversions and differences between law schools.

== Death ==
He died in 710/1310 in Baghdad on a Friday evening of the month Rabi' al-Awwal. He was buried in the city of Izaj located between Khuzestan and Isfahan. According to Kurashi and Ibn Taghribirdi, his date of death was 701 AH = 1301 AD.

== See also ==
- Abu al-Mu'in al-Nasafi
- Najm al-Din 'Umar al-Nasafi
- Burhan al-Din al-Marghinani
- List of Hanafis
- List of Maturidis
- List of Muslim theologians
