= Sadr al-Shari'a al-Asghar =

Hanafi-Maturidi scholar

Sadr al-Shari'a al-Asghar صدر الشريعة الأصغر
- Title: Sadr al-Shari'a ("preeminent [scholar] of the shari'a")

Personal life
- Died: 747 A.H. = 1346–47 A.D. Bukhara, Uzbekistan
- Era: Islamic Golden Age
- Region: Ma Wara' al-Nahr (the land which lies beyond the river), Transoxiana (Central Asia)
- Main interest(s): Aqidah, Kalam (Islamic theology), Tawhid, Fiqh (Islamic jurisprudence), Usul al-Fiqh, Hadith studies, Tafsir, Arabic grammar, Rhetoric, Logic, Philosophy, Astronomy, Natural sciences
- Notable work(s): Ta'dil al-'Ulum, Sharh al-Wiqaya

Religious life
- Religion: Islam
- Denomination: Sunni
- Jurisprudence: Hanafi
- Creed: Maturidi

Muslim leader
- Influenced by: Abu Hanifa Abu Mansur al-Maturidi Shams al-A'imma al-Sarakhsi Shams al-A'imma al-Halwani
- Influenced: Al-Taftazani 'Ali al-Qari 'Abd al-Hayy al-Lucknawi

Sadr al-Shari'a al-Asghar (Arabic: صدر الشريعة الأصغر), also known as Sadr al-Shari'a al-Thani (Arabic: صدر الشريعة الثاني), was a Hanafi-Maturidi scholar, faqih (jurist), mutakallim (theologian), mufassir (Qur'anic exegete), muhaddith (expert of the Hadith), nahawi (grammarian), lughawi (linguist), logician, and astronomer, known for both his theories of time and place and his commentary on Islamic jurisprudence, indicating the depth of his knowledge in various Islamic disciplines.

His lineage reaches 'Ubadah ibn al-Samit. He was praised by al-Taftazani, and 'Abd al-Hayy al-Lucknawi.

== Name ==
He is 'Ubayd-Allah b. Mas'ud b. Mahmud b. Ahmad b. 'Ubayd-Allah al-Mahbubi al-Bukhari.

He is also called Sadr al-Shari'a al-Asghar. Generally, when Sadr al-Shari'a is said, it refers to him. The term al-Asghar (English: the younger) or al-Thani (English: the second) is sometimes added after his title to differentiate him from his great grandfather Ahmad b. 'Ubayd-Allah who is also known as Sadr al-Shari'a but with the suffix of al-Akbar (English: the older, the greater) or al-Awwal (English: the first).

== Birth ==
His date of birth is not recorded in the well-known bio-dictionaries.

== Teachers ==
He was born into a family with a long line of scholars. He studied under his father as well as his grandfather.

== Works ==
His expertise expanded to many fields including Hadith, Fiqh, Usul al-Fiqh, kalam (theology), logic, grammar, rhetoric, exact and natural sciences. His knowledge was vast and incisive through which he was able to summarise many important and difficult topics succinctly.

He authored of a number of influential works in the Hanafi madhhab. His al-Tanqih (Arabic: التنقيح), along with his own commentary upon it entitled al-Tawdih (Arabic: التوضيح, lit. 'The Clarification'), is a work of usul al-fiqh that merges between 'the way of the jurists' (i.e. the Hanafis) and between 'the way of the scholastics', combining and reorganising the works of the Hanafi Fakhr al-Islam al-Bazdawi and the Maliki Ibn al-Hajib into a new synthesis. This work reflects a new development in the scholasticization of Hanafi jurisprudential theory. (Note: Sadr al-Shari'ah wrote Tanqih al-Usul (Refining the Fundamental Principles), in which he summarized Usul al-Bazdawi, al-Mahsul (Fakhr al-Din al-Razi's book), and the Mukhtasar al-Muntaha of the Maliki jurist Ibn al-Hajib (d. 646 AH). He then wrote a commentary on his own book entitled Tawdih al-Tanqih (Clarification of Refining) to which al-Taftazani (d. 792) added a marginal commentary entitled al-Talwih. All three books, al-Tanqih, al-Tawdih and al-Talwih are available in print.)

He authored a work (yet unpublished) known under the title Ta'dil al-'Ulum (Arabic: تعديل العلوم, lit. 'The Adjustment of the Sciences'), which became a milestone in the development of the Maturidi kalam in Khorasan and Ma Wara' al-Nahr (Transoxania).

His Ta'dil al-'Ulum was recommended by the sixteenth-century Ottoman scholar and judge Ahmed Taşköprüzade (d. 1561) to anyone desirous of reaching the highest degree of excellence in logic.

=== Astronomy ===
Sadr's astronomical work represents an ongoing revision of Ptolemaic astronomy. In that context, he undertook to correct the works of two of his predecessors, namely Nasir al-Din al-Tusi and Qutb al-Din al-Shirazi. The models of the last two were developed in their two respective works, the Tadhkira and the Tuhfa. Sadr took it upon himself to solve the problems they did not tackle, and to supply answers to the subtleties they did not address.

Sadr's astronomical writings are found in the third volume of his three‐volume encyclopedia of the sciences, the Ta'dil al-'Ulum (The Adjustment of the Sciences). The first two volumes dealt with logic and kalam. The third volume was called Kitab Ta'dil Hay'at al-Aflak (The Adjustment of the Configuration of the Celestial Spheres).

This encyclopaedia starts with logic, proceeds through theology, and ends with astronomy. It was written in Bukhara, and was finished shortly before the death of its author.

This work of Sadr is written in the traditional form of a commentary, where he gives his own text and then comments on the same. As is usual in such commentaries, the text is separated from the comments by the classical notation: a sentence preceded by the Arabic mim (short for matn) refers to the text, whereas the latter shin (for sharh) introduces the comment to that specific text. As a result, the work became voluminous, reaching some seventy densely written folios.

== Death ==
He died on 747 AH (1346–47 CE) and was buried in Bukhara.

== See also ==
- Shams al-Din al-Samarqandi
- Ulugh Beg
- Al-Biruni
- Ali Qushji
- Fakhr al-Din al-Razi
- Cosmology in medieval Islam
- List of astronomers § Sadr
- List of scientists in medieval Islamic world
- List of Hanafis
- List of Muslim theologians
- List of Ash'aris and Maturidis

== Arabic ==
- Sharh al-Wiqayah — World Digital Library (in Arabic)
- Sharh Mukhtasar al-Wiqayah — World Digital Library (in Arabic)
- The Logic in Ta'dil al-'Ulum (The Adjustment of the Sciences) (in Arabic)
- A Brief Biography of Sadr al-Shari'a (in Arabic)
