= Al-Kasani =

12th-century Islamic scholar

'Ala' al-Din al-Kasani علاء الدين الكاساني
- Title: King of the Scholars

Personal life
- Born: Kasansay Kara-Khanid Khanate
- Died: 3 August 1191 Aleppo, Ayyubid Sultanate
- Spouse: Fatima al-Samarqandi
- Era: Islamic Golden Age
- Main interest(s): Fiqh (Islamic jurisprudence), Aqidah (Islamic theology)
- Notable work: Bada'i' al-Sana'i'

Religious life
- Religion: Islam
- Denomination: Sunni
- Jurisprudence: Hanafi
- Creed: Maturidi

Muslim leader
- Influenced by: Abu Hanifa Abu al-Mu'in al-Nasafi 'Ala' al-Din al-Samarqandi Al-Sarakhsi
- Influenced: Jamal al-Din al-Ghaznawi

'Ala' al-Din al-Kasani (Arabic: علاء الدين الكاساني), known as Al-Kasani or al-Kashani, was a 12th Century Sunni Muslim Jurist who became an influential figure of the Hanafi school of Sunni jurisprudence, which has remained the most widely practiced law school in the Sunni tradition.

He was nicknamed Malik al-'Ulama' ("King of the Scholars"). His major work entitled Bada'i' al-Sana'i' fi Tartib al-Shara'i' (Arabic: بدائع الصنائع في ترتيب الشرائع) is one of the most important Islamic legal manuals of the Hanafi tradition.

== Life ==
=== Early life and marriage ===
Al-Kāsānī came from the place of Kāsān (Kasansay, Kosonsoy) in the Ferghana and was a student of the Hanafi legal scholar 'Ala' al-Din al-Samarqandi (died 1144), who gave him his daughter Fatima al-Samarqandi, who was trained in fiqh, as a wife. As a bridal gift he was to gift her a commentary on the legal compendium of her father, Tuḥfat al-fuqahā. The book, Bada'i As-Sana'i, was accepted as a dowry.

=== Career ===
At an unknown date, he emigrated to Asia Minor, where he worked at the court of the Rum-Seljuk Turks in Konya. Here he made an argument with another Jurist, in which he appeared so violent that the ruler Mas'ud I considered it impossible to keep him at the court. The topic of the debate was Ijtihad. His opponent accused al-Kāsānī of representing Mu'tazilite teachings. When al-Kāsānī punched his opponent, the ruler intervened and ended the discussion.

Since al-Kāsānī had made himself impossible by his behavior at the court, the ruler sent him on the advice of his vizier as ambassador to Nur ad-Din Zengi at Aleppo. Here he was appointed as successor of Radī ad-Dīn as-Sarachsī (died 1149) professor of Hanafi law at the Madrasa Hallāwīya.

=== Later life and death ===
Not much is known about his remaining life. Ali al-Qari reports that he was deeply attached to his wife Fātima. Whenever he had any doubts and erred in issuing a fatwa, she would inform him the correct judgment and explain the reason for the mistake. Although al-Kasani was a competent jurist, Fatima corrected and edited his legal opinions. He visited her grave at the Abraham Sanctuary in the citadel of Aleppo every Thursday evening after her death. After his death in 1191 he was buried beside her.

== Teachers ==
He studied under prominent scholars, such as Abu al-Mu'in al-Nasafi, and 'Ala' al-Din al-Samarqandi.

== Students ==
Among his pupils was Jamal al-Din al-Ghaznawi.

== Works ==
Al-Kasani's main work is his handbook Bada'i' al-Sana'i' fi Tartib al-Shara'i' (Arabic: بدائع الصنائع في ترتيب الشرائع), which occupies seven volumes in the modern print edition. It is said to be the commentary al-Kāsānī wrote to the handbook of his teacher, as-Samarqandī, but it does not have the character of a commentary, but rather a strictly systematic account of the various legal domains. Al-Kāsānī begins each chapter with an outline in which he explains which subjects he intends to deal with. However, despite its methodological clarity, the work had no major impact on the development of Hanafi law for a certain period of time. In contrast to the "Al-Hidayah" of his contemporary al-Marghinānī it has never been commented on. Only the appearance of the modern print edition in the early 20th century has given the work greater attention. Since then, it has been of central importance in the Hanafi Academic Institutions.

In addition to the Badā'i al-Kāsānī has also written a Qur'an commentary, preserved as a manuscript.

== See also ==
- List of Hanafis
- List of Ash'aris and Maturidis

Early Islamic scholars

Muhammad, The final Messenger of God (570–632) the Constitution of Medina, taught the Quran, and advised his companions
Abdullah ibn Masud (died 653) taught	Ali (607–661) fourth caliph taught	Aisha, Muhammad's wife and Abu Bakr's daughter taught	Abd Allah ibn Abbas (618–687) taught	Zayd ibn Thabit (610–660) taught	Umar (579–644) second caliph taught	Abu Hurairah (603–681) taught
Alqama ibn Qays (died 681) taught	Husayn ibn Ali (626–680) taught	Qasim ibn Muhammad ibn Abi Bakr (657–725) taught and raised by Aisha	Urwah ibn Zubayr (died 713) taught by Aisha, he then taught	Said ibn al-Musayyib (637–715) taught	Abdullah ibn Umar (614–693) taught	Abd Allah ibn al-Zubayr (624–692) taught by Aisha, he then taught
Ibrahim al-Nakha’i taught	Ali ibn Husayn Zayn al-Abidin (659–712) taught	Hisham ibn Urwah (667–772) taught	Ibn Shihab al-Zuhri (died 741) taught	Salim ibn Abd-Allah ibn Umar taught	Umar ibn Abdul Aziz (682–720) raised and taught by Abdullah ibn Umar
Hammad ibn Abi Sulayman taught	Muhammad al-Baqir (676–733) taught	Farwah bint al-Qasim Jafar's mother
Abu Hanifa (699–767) wrote Al Fiqh Al Akbar and Kitab Al-Athar, jurisprudence followed by Sunni, Sunni Sufi, Barelvi, Deobandi, Zaidiyyah and originally by the Fatimid and taught	Zayd ibn Ali (695–740)	Ja'far bin Muhammad Al-Baqir (702–765) Muhammad and Ali's great great grand son, jurisprudence followed by Shia, he taught	Malik ibn Anas (711–795) wrote Muwatta, jurisprudence from early Medina period now mostly followed by Maliki Sunnis in North Africa, and taught	Al-Waqidi (748–822) wrote history books like Kitab al-Tarikh wa al-Maghazi, student of Malik ibn Anas	Abu Muhammad Abdullah ibn Abdul Hakam (died 829) wrote biographies and history books, student of Malik ibn Anas
Abu Yusuf (729–798) wrote Usul al-fiqh	Muhammad al-Shaybani (749–805)	al-Shafi‘i (767–820) wrote Al-Risala, jurisprudence followed by Shafi'i Sunnis and Sufis, and taught	Ismail ibn Ibrahim	Ali ibn al-Madini (778–849) wrote The Book of Knowledge of the Companions	Ibn Hisham (died 833) wrote early history and As-Sirah an-Nabawiyyah, Muhammad's biography
Isma'il ibn Ja'far (719–775)	Musa al-Kadhim (745–799)	Ahmad ibn Hanbal (780–855) wrote Musnad Ahmad ibn Hanbal jurisprudence followed by Hanbali Sunnis and Sufis	Muhammad al-Bukhari (810–870) wrote Sahih al-Bukhari hadith books	Muslim ibn al-Hajjaj (815–875) wrote Sahih Muslim hadith books	Dawud al-Zahiri (815–883/4) founded the Zahiri school	Muhammad ibn Isa at-Tirmidhi (824–892) wrote Jami` at-Tirmidhi hadith books	Al-Baladhuri (died 892) wrote early history Futuh al-Buldan, Genealogies of the Nobles
Ibn Majah (824–887) wrote Sunan ibn Majah hadith book	Abu Dawood (817–889) wrote Sunan Abu Dawood Hadith Book
Muhammad ibn Ya'qub al-Kulayni (864- 941) wrote Kitab al-Kafi hadith book followed by Twelver Shia	Muhammad ibn Jarir al-Tabari (838–923) wrote History of the Prophets and Kings, Tafsir al-Tabari	Abu al-Hasan al-Ash'ari (874–936) wrote Maqālāt al-islāmīyīn, Kitāb al-luma, Kitāb al-ibāna 'an usūl al-diyāna
Ibn Babawayh (923–991) wrote Man La Yahduruhu al-Faqih jurisprudence followed by Twelver Shia	Sharif Razi (930–977) wrote Nahj al-Balagha followed by Twelver Shia	Nasir al-Din al-Tusi (1201–1274) wrote jurisprudence books followed by Ismaili and Twelver Shia	Al-Ghazali (1058–1111) wrote The Niche for Lights, The Incoherence of the Philosophers, The Alchemy of Happiness on Sufism	Rumi (1207–1273) wrote Masnavi, Diwan-e Shams-e Tabrizi on Sufism
Key: Some of Muhammad's Companions	Key: Taught in Medina	Key: Taught in Iraq	Key: Worked in Syria	Key: Travelled extensively collecting the sayings of Muhammad and compiled books of hadith	Key: Worked in Persia
