= Ibn Abidin =

Syrian Hanafi Jurist

Ibn ʿᾹbidīn ابن عابدين
- Title: Final verifier of the Hanafi School

Personal life
- Born: 1784 Damascus, Damascus Eyalet, Ottoman Empire
- Died: 1836 (aged 51–52) Damascus, Damascus Eyalet, Ottoman Empire
- Main interest(s): Fiqh (Islamic jurisprudence), Usul al-Fiqh (principles of jurisprudence), Islamic inheritance jurisprudence, Tafsir, Rhetoric
- Notable work: Radd al-Muhtar 'ala al-Durr al-Mukhtar

Religious life
- Religion: Islam
- Denomination: Sunni
- Jurisprudence: Hanafi
- Tariqa: Qadiri
- Creed: Maturidi

Muslim leader
- Influenced by: Abu Hanifa Al-Sarakhsi Burhan al-Din al-Marghinani Al-Kasani Abu al-Barakat al-Nasafi Al-Haskafi
- Influenced: Al-Maydani 'Abdullah al-Harari

Ibn 'Abidin (Arabic: ابن عابدين; full name: Muḥammad Amīn ibn ʿUmar ibn ʿAbd al-ʿAzīz ibn Aḥmad in ʿAbd ar-Raḥīm ibn Najmuddīn ibn Muḥammad Ṣalāḥuddīn al-Shāmī, died 1836 CE / AH 1252), known in the Indian subcontinent as al-Shami, was an Islamic scholar and Jurist who lived in the city of Damascus in Syria during the Ottoman era. He was the authority of the fiqh (Islamic jurisprudence) of the Hanafi madhhab (school of law). He was a state employee with the title of Amin al-fatwa. This meant that he was the mufti that people would go to when they had legal questions in Damascus. He composed over 50 works consisting of a major fatwa (legal statement) collection, many treatises, poems, and several commentaries on the works of others.

His most famous work was the Radd al-Muhtar 'ala al-Durr al-Mukhtar. This is still considered the authoritative text of Hanafi fiqh today.

== Childhood ==
Ibn Abidin was born in Damascus in 1784. His family came from a long line of scholars and was, therefore, well respected. He studied the Qur'an starting at a very young age and received his first general degree of authorization from his first teacher, shaykh Muhammad al-Kuzbari al-Kabir, when he was about 12 years old. He was said to have memorized the Qur'an before he reached maturity. He was a very determined student. After reciting the Qur'an at his father's shop and receiving criticism for it, he sought to perfect his work and studied vigorously under several well-known scholars. After much hard work, he received four degrees of authorization.

== Legal views ==
In Islamic law, a mufti is one who determines what is right and wrong thing to do in a legal situation or conflict. The general rules for the decision making are that one must first base his answer on what the Prophet did and the Qur'an, then on what the head of their particular school of law did, then on their mufti predecessors. There was to be no bias and all of the decisions were to be based on previous methods. However, in reality this was not the case. Ibn Abidin is an excellent example of how the fatwa system worked in reality. Ibn Abidin had a more modernistic view. Being a mufti of the Ottoman era, he was influenced not only by the Islam scholars, but by the Ottoman's, which does not follow the general rules listed above. He also went back and shortened, edited, and added his own opinion to the Damascus mufti before him, Hamid al-Imadi. This went against the respecting of his ancestors' decisions as more sound than his. His more obvious area of flexibility involves his view on urf (local custom).

=== Urf and Ijtihad ===
Ibn Abidin's view on urf was that it was important to include it in fatwas. He claimed that many things change with time and that the laws need to be flexible in order to account for the change in urf.

At one point he wrote, "Many of the rules change with the change of time..."

This poses a huge problem with keeping fatwas unbiased. Ibn Abidin's solution to this problem was that Shari'a law was built with the goal of making the life of a believer free from suffering and that if urf was not included in decision making it would result in suffering.

He states that, "jurists should not proceed by strictly and rigidly adhering to the authoritative books and opinions of the madhhab, but should also pay attention to the needs of the people of his time, or else the harm he does will outweigh the benefit."

Other jurists besides Ibn Abidin did consider the current urf in their fatwas also. If their fatwa contradicted the founder of their madhhab, then their reasoning was that if their founder had been alive during their time he would have given the same decision. Another issue which relates to the use of the current urf in fatwas, is the use of ijtihad (individual interpretation or exertion of effort). The use of ijtihad was said to have been ended amongst Hanafis long before Ibn Abidin was a mufti. However, Ibn Abidin uses great amounts of effort in order to determine the correct answer to a problem in his fatwa, using the knowledge of the common urf and his own reasoning. He seems to have believed that ijtihad was still acceptable to use in certain circumstances. For example, he states that "If Abu Hanifa has a ruling on a matter at hand, then his view is to be followed. If not, then we look for views by Abu Yusuf, then Muhammad al-Shaybani, then Zufar, then Hasan, then some other lesser jurists, but if no one has an answer at all, then it is incumbent on the mufti to look into it by way of deep thinking and ijtihad." The names following Abu Hanifa are those of well-known muftis and scholars before Ibn Abidin's time. So he believed that ijtihad was acceptable if there was no other option. However, this was not truly his only exception. He also considered acceptable to use his own reason if times had changed and the law required a change. This required change usually meant to him that the times were becoming more and more corrupted and the laws needed to be made stricter.

=== Marriage ===
In the time of Ibn Abidin, marriage was an extremely important part of society. Everyone was expected to be married and each person was expected to marry someone within their same social class. For example, a woman in the lower class could not marry a man in the middle class or vice versa. When it came to deciding equality of two individuals to determine if two individuals that were to be married were equally matched, Ibn Abidin came to the realization that occupations were not considered of the same status in all locations. He classified those in the lowest class to consist of barbers, metal workers, shepherds, and bath-keepers, but added that there was not a clear distinction because it depended on the custom of the location the persons lived in. When it came to equality, Ibn Abidin also stated that a non-Arab was lower than an Arab and that a learned non-Arab was higher than an ignorant non-Arab. What he meant by this was that a Muslim was of higher class than a non-Muslim and that a non-Muslim believer was of a higher class than of a no-Muslim non-believer. Each child, male and female, was assigned a wali (guardian) to find them a spouse and arrange their marriage. The wali was traditionally the father or the grandfather, so complications arose when a child was an orphan or did not have a father or grandfather. More complications arose if the wali was considered to be unable to make proper decisions. Ibn Abidin came up with fatwas to some of these problems. He said that the guardian of an orphan had the responsibility of the wali. He also said that if the wali disregards a good marriage offer that the court has the right to interfere. Both females and males were considered to have a choice in whom they married after they reached maturity. However, males were free to pick their wives while the women were considered to approve of a marriage if they were silent after having been told all the specifics of an offer. After marriage, Ibn Abidin said that the husband was obligated to provide for the wife no matter what her financial situation based on her social standing. For example, an upper-class wife would have to be fed wheat bread and meat for lunch, a middle class wife would have to be fed bread and animal fat, and a lower-class wife would have to be fed bread and cheese. According to Ibn Abidin, and many other scholars, both the man and woman were expected to fulfill each other sexually. If the husband was not receiving pleasure from his wife, then he had the right to stop providing for her and to divorce her unless she had a disability. If the wife was not receiving pleasure from the husband, on the other hand, the wife would have to wait one year before she could ask the court for a divorce.

== Relationship with the state ==
Ibn Abidin and other state-appointed muftis had a complex relationship with the state. For example, Ibn Abidin adds a note at the end of one of his fatwas about taxes that criticizes the state's collection of taxes. "But most of the extraordinary taxes imposed on the villages these days are not for preservation of either property or people, but are mere oppression and aggression and most of the expenses of the governor and his subordinates and the buildings of his residence and the residences of his soldiers and what he pays to the messengers of the sulton…levied in our country twice yearly and there are many sums on top of it that are taken as presents to his assistants and attendants…"

== Death ==
Ibn Abidin died on 21 Rabi al-thani in the year 1252 AH at the age of 54 years. His funeral prayer was led by his own teacher Saýīd al-Ĥalabī who broke down, weeping and clutching his own beard said: 'I was treasuring you, for what comes after my old age'. Prayers were held in the Sināniyyah mosque and he was buried – in accordance with his will – near the grave of Shaykh Álāuddin al-Ĥaşkafī, the author of Durr al-Mukhtār and next to the great muĥaddith Şāliĥ al-Jaynīnī in Damascus.

== Radd al Muhtar ==
Ibn Abidin systematically went through the works and positions of the school with depth and preciseness. Regarding the encompassing scope of Ibn 'Abidin in Hanafi fiqh, the then Mufti of Beirut, Shaykh Muhammad Effendi al-Hulawani in Takmila Radd al-Muhtar said, "I never heard any lesson like that of Ibn 'Abidin. I would try my hardest to research the next day's topic as extensively and thoroughly as possible by reading and understanding all the gloss and commentary written on it. I would think that I had comprehended it completely. However, Ibn 'Abidin would teach us the same lesson the next day and not only cover everything that I had researched but would also provide further clarification and deeper understanding in them, and would add to it many other beneficial points than I had even come across in any of the works nor even thought about." As such, Radd al-Muhtar is considered one of the most comprehensive, encyclopaedic compilations of the Hanafi school, even more extensive than the Fatawa Hindiyya, a slightly earlier work commissioned by the Mughul emperor, Aurangzeb.

== Works ==
Ibn Abidin wrote numerous books on subjects ranging from prayers to medicine. It was his extensive knowledge of jurisprudence that distinguished him. He wrote exegesis of previous juristic books which were far beyond common man's understanding. In this same context, he compiled his most famous book: Radd al-Muhtar 'ala al-Durr al-Mukhtar, a voluminous extension of Imam Hasfaki's Durr al mukhtar. Following are some of his major works:

1. Radd al-Muhtar ala al-Dur al-Mukhtar: This is the most comprehensive and the most authoritative book on Ĥanafī fiqh in the world today. It has been published many times: the Būlāq edition of 1272 AH in five volumes and later in 1276 AH and 1299 AH; the Maymaniyyah edition in 1307 AH; the Istanbul edition of 1307 AH. Once again in 1323 AH, there was a Maymaniyyah edition; and later in 1323 AH, the Bābi al-Ĥalabī edition and Istanbul edition in eight volumes along with the Takmalah, which has been photo-offset a number of times hence.
2. Al-Úqūd ad-Durriyyah fī Tanqīĥi Al-Fatāwā al-Ĥāmidiyyah [The String of Pearls: A Revision of Ĥamid's Fatāwā]: being the revision of the fatāwā of Shaykh Ĥāmiduddin al-Ímādi; published in two volumes.
3. Ĥāshiyah álā Tafsīr al-Qāđī al-Bayđāwi:[Marginalia on the Exegesis of Bayđawi]: he made it a point to annotate it such that it contains only those points which no other mufassir [exegete] has mentioned before.
4. Ĥāshiyah álā Ifāđātu'l Anwār Sharĥ al-Manār [Marginalia on Extensions of Radiance: an Exegesis of the Lodestar – Al-Manār of Ĥaşkafī].
5. Ĥāshiyah álā Sharĥ At-Taqrīr wa't Taĥbīr fī'l Uşūl of ibn Amīr Ĥājj. [Marginalia on the Exegesis of Speeches and Writing on the matter of Principles of Islamic Knowledge].
6. Fatāwā fī'l Fiqh'li Ĥanafī, containing about a hundred rulings other than those in his Risālah. It is also known as Ajwibatun Muĥaqqiqah.
7. Al-Fawāyid al-Mukhaşşasah bi Aĥkāmi Kayy al-Ĥummaşah: An article on medicine. A brilliant doctor in earlier times had devised a novel way to extract pus from festers and abscesses using chickpea. Ibn Áābidīn has combined two separate monographs on this subject along with his own additions. The first being Al-Aĥkām al-Mulakhkhişah fī Ĥukmi Kayy al-Ĥummaşah by Shurnblāli and the second, Al-Abĥāth al-Mulakhkhişah fī Ĥukmi Kayy al-Ĥummaşah by Shaykh Ábd al-Ghanī an-Nāblūsi. He completed the manuscript in 1227 AH.
8. Rafá at-Taraddud fī Áqdi'l Aşābiý índa't Tashahhud: A compilation of the sayings of Ĥanafī imāms in the matter of raising the index finger and make a circle with other fingers in tashahhud. Refuting the opinion of some Ĥanafīs who rule that only raising the index finger is necessary without encircling other fingers. It was completed in Rabīý al-Awwal, 1249 AH.
9. Shifā al-Álīl wa Ball al-Ghalīl fī Ĥukmi'l Waşiyyati bi'l Khitmāti wa't Tahālīl: He wrote this to refute a practise prevalent among the people during the plague of 1228 in Damascus. The practise being circulation of a 'will' to complete khitmah [a round of reciting the Qur'an completely] and tahlīl [reciting the formula: lā ilāha illā Allāh].
10. Tanbīh Dhawi'l Afhām álā Aĥkāmi't Tablīghi Khalf al-Imām: An explanation concerning a follower repeating the imām's takbīrs loudly during şalāt [to amplify the takbirs; a mukabbir]. This topic has been dealt with in a comprehensive manner; it starts with an introduction, has a body and ends with a conclusion. It was completed on the first of Muĥarram 1226 AH.
11. Tanbīh al-Ghafīl wa'l Wasnān álā Aĥkāmi Hilāli Ramađān: He wrote this monograph obeying his shaykh, in which he compiledthe canonical ruling concerning the new moon, or the crescent of Ramađan according to all the four madh'habs. Apparently this was to dispel doubts arising of a controversy concerning the new moon of Ramađān in Damascus of the year 1240 AH.

== See also ==
- List of Hanafis
- List of Ash'aris and Maturidis
