= Abu Zayd al-Dabusi =

Founding jurist of the Hanafī school

- Died: 1038/39; Bukhara

Academic work
- Notable works: Asrār ('Mysteries'), Takwīm lil Adilla (‘System of demonstrations’), Taalīkas.
- Notable ideas: dialectics
- Influenced: Salah al-Dīn al-Ṣafadi

Abū Zayd al-Dabūsī; he is Abd Allāh, or Ubaid Allāh ibn Umar ibn ‘Īsa al-Dabūsi al-Bukhārī Hanafī al-Qadī (عبد الله أو عبيد الله بن عمر بن عيسى الدّبوسي البخاري الحنفي القاضي); a founding jurist and most eminent scholar of the Hanafī school in the eleventh century. His reputation for learning was proverbial. He established the science of dialectics supporting his analysis and argument on examples extracted from scripture. He composed several taalīkas. (Note: The two kinds of Taalīkas are: i) notes taken during a lesson. ii) clarification notes on ambiguous passages, or commentary notes. Ad-Dabūsi’s were the second.) Among his writings were Asrār ('Mysteries') (Note: A treatise on the legal rulings and points of law.) and the Takwīm lil Adilla (‘system of demonstrations’) (Note: Theology treatise.). Ad-Dabūsi died in the city of Bukhara in 430 AH / 1038–9.

The name Dabūsi derives from the town Dabūsiya, which lies between Bukhāra and Samarkand, and from where a number of scholars hailed.

== Sources ==
Kitāb Wafayāt al-Ayān (وفيات الأعيان) by Ibn Khallikān (ابن خلكان); vol.II, p. 28

Al-Bidayah wa’l-Nihāyat (البداية والنهاية) by Ibn Kathīr (ابن كثير) vol.12, p. 46

Shuḍrāt al-ḍahab (شذرات الذهب) by Ibn al-‘Amād al-Hanbali (ابن العماد) vol.3, p. 245

Al-Fawā’id al-Baḥīa (الفوائد البهية) by Abd al-Hayy al-Lucknawi (لكنوي) p. 109

== See also ==
- List of Arab scientists and scholars
- Encyclopædia Britannica Online
