= Bada'i' al-Sana'i' =

12th-century book by Al-Kasani

Bada'i' al-Sana'i' fi Tartib al-Shara'i'
- Author: Al-Kasani
- Language: Arabic
- Subject: Hanafi Fiqh
- Publication place: Uzbekistan - Syria

Bada'i' as-Sana'i' fi Tartib ash-Shara'i' (Marvellous artistry in the arrangement of the religious-legal regulations)(Arabic: بـدائـع الـصـنـائـع فـي تـرتـيـب الـشـرائـع) is a classical manual of fiqh for the Hanafi school of Islamic jurisprudence. The author of the text is 6th century (Hijri) jurist 'Ala' al-Din al-Kasani. The book was written as an explanation of Tuhfat al-Fuqaha', a work of Al-Kasani's teacher 'Ala' al-Din al-Samarqandi, whose daughter, Fatima Al-Samarqandi, accepted it as a Bridal Gift. The book is taught in Hanafi schools today.

== Authorship ==
Al-Kasani was a student of the Hanafi legal scholar 'Ala' al-Din al-Samarqandi (died 1144), the author of Tuhfat al-Fuqaha'. Al-Samarqandi's daughter, Fatima, was also trained in Fiqh. Fatima al-Samarqandi was considered as the most beautiful woman of her time, leading to many proposals to marry her. She and her father had rejected many people, including rulers, who asked for her hand in marriage. Fatima and her father only accepted Al-Kasani's proposal after he wrote Bada'i As-Sana'i as an explanation of Tuhfat Al-Fuqaha, and Bada'i As-Sana'i was accepted as a Bridal Gift for Fatima.

== About ==
The book occupies seven volumes in the modern print edition. Despite being a commentary, it does not have the characteristics of a commentary, but rather a strictly systematic account of the various legal domains. Al-Kāsānī begins each chapter with an outline in which he explains which subjects he intends to deal with. However, despite its methodological clarity, the work had no major impact on the development of Hanafi law for a certain period of time. In contrast to "Al-Hidayah" of his contemporary al-Marghinānī, it had never been commented on. The appearance of the modern print edition in the early 20th century has given the work greater attention. Since then, it has been of central importance in the Hanafi Academic Institutions.
