= Fatima al-Samarqandi =

12th-century Hanafi Islamic scholar

ʿĀlimah al-Islām Fatima al-Samarqandi فاطمة السمرقندي
- Official name: Fāṭimah bint Muḥammad ibn Aḥmad al-Samarqandī

Personal life
- Born: Fatima bint Muhammad ibn Ahmad al-Samarqandi; 12th century CE (c. 500 AH) Samarkand, Kara-Khanid Khanate (modern-day Uzbekistan)
- Died: 1185 CE (581 AH) Aleppo, Ayyubid dynasty (modern-day Syria)
- Resting place: Aleppo, Syria
- Spouse: Al-Kasani
- Era: Islamic Golden Age
- Main interest: Jurisprudence (Fiqh)
- Occupation: Scholar; Jurist

Religious life
- Religion: Islam
- Denomination: Sunni
- Jurisprudence: Hanafi

Muslim leader
- Influenced by: Abu Hanifa 'Ala' al-Din al-Samarqandi Al-Kasani

Fatima bint Muhammad ibn Ahmad al-Samarqandi (فاطمة بنت محمد بن أحمد السمرقندي), known as Fatima al-Samarqani, was a twelfth-century female Sunni Muslim Hanafi–Scholar and Jurist. She is widely regarded to be known as one of the most influential female figures in Islamic jurisprudence history. She was also a personal advisor of Nur al-Din Zengi, ruler of the Seljuk Empire of Syria.

== Biography ==
=== Early life ===
Fatima was born to Muhammad ibn Ahmad al-Samarqandi, a preeminent Hanafi jurist who took active part in his daughter’s education. He authored the book Tuhfat al-Fuqaha'.

=== Marriage and career ===
She married 'Ala' al-Din al-Kasani, a student of her father and an expert of fiqh. Fatima’s dowry was Al-Kasani’s book, Bada'i' al-Sana'i' (The Most Marvellous of Beneficial Things), a commentary that he wrote on her father’s book, Tuhfat al-Fuqaha'. Her father was so impressed by the book that he accepted it as her dowry on behalf of Ala over the kings that had asked for her hand and offered more. When her husband had any doubts and erred in issuing a fatwa, she would inform him the correct judgment and explain the reason for the mistake. Although al-Kasani was a competent jurist, Fatima corrected and edited his legal opinions.

Fatima al-Samarqandi was a personal counselor of Nur ad-Din, the mentor of Saladin.

=== Legacy ===
According to researcher Hoda Gamal, she is credited with establishing the tradition of setting up voluntary iftars for male fuqaha.

== See also ==
- List of female Muslim scholars
- List of Hanafis
- List of Maturidis

Early Islamic scholars

Muhammad, The final Messenger of God (570–632) the Constitution of Medina, taught the Quran, and advised his companions
Abdullah ibn Masud (died 653) taught	Ali (607–661) fourth caliph taught	Aisha, Muhammad's wife and Abu Bakr's daughter taught	Abd Allah ibn Abbas (618–687) taught	Zayd ibn Thabit (610–660) taught	Umar (579–644) second caliph taught	Abu Hurairah (603–681) taught
Alqama ibn Qays (died 681) taught	Husayn ibn Ali (626–680) taught	Qasim ibn Muhammad ibn Abi Bakr (657–725) taught and raised by Aisha	Urwah ibn Zubayr (died 713) taught by Aisha, he then taught	Said ibn al-Musayyib (637–715) taught	Abdullah ibn Umar (614–693) taught	Abd Allah ibn al-Zubayr (624–692) taught by Aisha, he then taught
Ibrahim al-Nakha’i taught	Ali ibn Husayn Zayn al-Abidin (659–712) taught	Hisham ibn Urwah (667–772) taught	Ibn Shihab al-Zuhri (died 741) taught	Salim ibn Abd-Allah ibn Umar taught	Umar ibn Abdul Aziz (682–720) raised and taught by Abdullah ibn Umar
Hammad ibn Abi Sulayman taught	Muhammad al-Baqir (676–733) taught	Farwah bint al-Qasim Jafar's mother
Abu Hanifa (699–767) wrote Al Fiqh Al Akbar and Kitab Al-Athar, jurisprudence followed by Sunni, Sunni Sufi, Barelvi, Deobandi, Zaidiyyah and originally by the Fatimid and taught	Zayd ibn Ali (695–740)	Ja'far bin Muhammad Al-Baqir (702–765) Muhammad and Ali's great great grand son, jurisprudence followed by Shia, he taught	Malik ibn Anas (711–795) wrote Muwatta, jurisprudence from early Medina period now mostly followed by Maliki Sunnis in North Africa, and taught	Al-Waqidi (748–822) wrote history books like Kitab al-Tarikh wa al-Maghazi, student of Malik ibn Anas	Abu Muhammad Abdullah ibn Abdul Hakam (died 829) wrote biographies and history books, student of Malik ibn Anas
Abu Yusuf (729–798) wrote Usul al-fiqh	Muhammad al-Shaybani (749–805)	al-Shafi‘i (767–820) wrote Al-Risala, jurisprudence followed by Shafi'i Sunnis and Sufis, and taught	Ismail ibn Ibrahim	Ali ibn al-Madini (778–849) wrote The Book of Knowledge of the Companions	Ibn Hisham (died 833) wrote early history and As-Sirah an-Nabawiyyah, Muhammad's biography
Isma'il ibn Ja'far (719–775)	Musa al-Kadhim (745–799)	Ahmad ibn Hanbal (780–855) wrote Musnad Ahmad ibn Hanbal jurisprudence followed by Hanbali Sunnis and Sufis	Muhammad al-Bukhari (810–870) wrote Sahih al-Bukhari hadith books	Muslim ibn al-Hajjaj (815–875) wrote Sahih Muslim hadith books	Dawud al-Zahiri (815–883/4) founded the Zahiri school	Muhammad ibn Isa at-Tirmidhi (824–892) wrote Jami` at-Tirmidhi hadith books	Al-Baladhuri (died 892) wrote early history Futuh al-Buldan, Genealogies of the Nobles
Ibn Majah (824–887) wrote Sunan ibn Majah hadith book	Abu Dawood (817–889) wrote Sunan Abu Dawood Hadith Book
Muhammad ibn Ya'qub al-Kulayni (864- 941) wrote Kitab al-Kafi hadith book followed by Twelver Shia	Muhammad ibn Jarir al-Tabari (838–923) wrote History of the Prophets and Kings, Tafsir al-Tabari	Abu al-Hasan al-Ash'ari (874–936) wrote Maqālāt al-islāmīyīn, Kitāb al-luma, Kitāb al-ibāna 'an usūl al-diyāna
Ibn Babawayh (923–991) wrote Man La Yahduruhu al-Faqih jurisprudence followed by Twelver Shia	Sharif Razi (930–977) wrote Nahj al-Balagha followed by Twelver Shia	Nasir al-Din al-Tusi (1201–1274) wrote jurisprudence books followed by Ismaili and Twelver Shia	Al-Ghazali (1058–1111) wrote The Niche for Lights, The Incoherence of the Philosophers, The Alchemy of Happiness on Sufism	Rumi (1207–1273) wrote Masnavi, Diwan-e Shams-e Tabrizi on Sufism
Key: Some of Muhammad's Companions	Key: Taught in Medina	Key: Taught in Iraq	Key: Worked in Syria	Key: Travelled extensively collecting the sayings of Muhammad and compiled books of hadith	Key: Worked in Persia
