= Abd al-Ghani al-Ghunaymi al-Maydani =

Jurist and legal theorist in the Hanafi school

Al-Maydani

Personal life
- Born: 1807 Maydan Village, near Damascus, Damascus Eyalet, Ottoman Empire
- Died: 1881 (aged 73–74)

Religious life
- Religion: Islam
- Denomination: Sunni
- Jurisprudence: Hanafi

Muslim leader
- Influenced by: Abu Hanifa

ʿAbd al-Ghanī ibn Ṭālib bin Ḥamāda ibn Ibrāhīm al-Ghunaymī al-Dimashqī al-Maydānī (عبد الغني الغنيمي الميداني الحنفي) was a jurist (faqīh) and legal theorist (uṣūlī) adhering to the Hanafi school as well as a traditionalist (muḥaddith) and grammarian (naḥwī). Born in 1222 AH in the Maydān neighborhood in southern Damascus, he was known for his vast knowledge and his eagerness to apply it. Just as the neighborhood of his birth still bears this name to this day, he too has become known popularly as al-Maydānī.

== Teachers and students ==
After memorizing the Qurʾān, he studied with the greatest of the scholars in Damascus during that era. These included:

1. Shaykh ʿUmar al-Mujtahid al-Dimashqī
2. Hanafi jurist Saʿīd al-Ḥalabī (subsequently al-Dimashqī)
3. the traditionalist and best known jurist of the Levant Shaykh Imām ʿAlā al-Dīn Ibn ʿAbidīn
4. Shafiʿī jurist ʿAbd al-Ghanī al-Saqaṭī
5. Hanafi jurist and author of Radd al-Muḥtār ʿalā al-Durar al-Mukhtār Muḥammad Amīn ibn ʿĀbidīn
6. ʿAbd al-Raḥmān bin Muḥammad al-Kuzbarī al-Shafiʿī, author of al-Thabat
7. Aḥmad Bībars
8. Ḥasan ibn Ibrāhīm al-Bayṭār, the Shafiʿī jurist of his era

== Qualities ==
There were many poetic verses written in praise of him, which can be found in Ḥilya al-Bashar fī Tārikh al-Qarn al-Thālith ʿAshar by Shaykh ʿAbd al-Razzāq al-Bayṭār. (See volume 2, pp. 867–870)

When riots between Muslims and Christians in 1277 AH/1860 AD broke out, he played a significant role in extinguishing the chaos and restoring order. He was described as being far from antagonism and tribalism due to his distance from the material world and his piety.

Many from the region of Shām and beyond studied with him, including ʿAllāma Imām Shaykh Ṭāhir al-Jazāʾiriī and Ustādh Saʿīd al-Shartūnī al-Lubnānī al-Naṣrānī.

He was one of the advisors to Isma'il Pasha of Egypt after 1862 and attended its opening ceremony from Damascus in the presence of Emir Abdelkader.

== Works ==
Shaykh al-Mayḍāni was not prolific in his writings, but he was certainly amongst the best in the works he did author. These include al-Lubāb fī Sharḥ al-Kitāb in Hanafi fiqh.

When al-Kitāb is mentioned amongst the Hanafis, the Mukhtaṣar of al-Qudurī is intended. Imam al-Qudūrī was the Hanafi jurist and traditionist, Abū al-Ḥusayn Aḥmad ibn Muḥammad al-Qudūrī al-Baghdādī. It is with him the leadership of the Hanafis in Iraq comes to an end. He was born in 362 AH and died in 428 AH. He was also one of the teachers of al-Ḥāfiẓ al-Khaṭīb al-Baghdādī, the author of Tārīkh Baghdād.

This Mukhtaṣar is considered to be one of the reliable books within the Hanafi school, used by adherents of the school into the present day. For this reason Shaykh al-Mayḍanī undertook the task of writing a commentary on it and elucidating its contents. He sought to relate the chosen and established legal positions. This book was widely accepted during his lifetime and after his death. He finished writing it on the 13th of Ramadan in 1266 AH according to the most sound report. However, Ismaʿīl Bāshā al-Baghdādī in Hadiyya al-ʿĀrifīn and Sarkīs in Muʿjam al-Maṭbūʿāt opine that the year was 1267 AH.

This book's first edition was first published during the lifetime of the author in Qasṭanṭaniya/Asātina, modern-day Istanbul, in the year 1274–1275. Thereafter, numerous editions were printed. Unfortunately, many of those printed in Egypt are filled with errors except those proofread by Ustādh Muḥammad Muḥyī al-Dīn ʿAbd al-Ḥamīd.

Shaykh ʿAbdul Fattāh notes that he spent time in Damascus on 20 Muharram 1378 to review all of the manuscripts of Shaykh al-Maydānī. These included:

1. Sharḥ al-Marāh fī al-Ṣarf, 133 pages.
2. Sharḥ ʿAqīda al-Imām al-Ṭaḥāwī, 100 pages.
3. Kashf al-Iltibās ʿAmmā Awradahū al-Imām al-Bukhārī ʿalā Baʿḍ al-Nās, 35 pages. Edited and published by Shaykh Abdul Fattāh Abū Ghudda.

== Death ==
Al-Maydānī died in the year 1298 of the Hijra calendar.
