= Abu Sulayman al-Juzajani =

Abū Sulaymān al-Jūzajānī

Personal life
- Born: Jowzjan
- Died: 815 Baghdad, Iraq
- Era: Middle Ages
- Region: Abbasid Caliphate
- Notable work(s): See below

Religious life
- Religion: Islam
- Denomination: Sunni
- Jurisprudence: Ḥanafī

Muslim leader
- Influenced by: Muhammad al-Shaybani, Abu Yusuf, Ibn al-Mubarak

Abū Sulaymān al-Jūzajānī (Arabic: أبو سليمان الجُوْزَجَانِيّ) was an Islamic scholar of the Hanafi school of thought. He was a student of Muhammad al-Shaybani and Abu Yusuf, who were themselves two major students of Abu Hanifah an-Nu'man, the founder of the Hanafi school.

== Biography ==
His real name was Mūsā ibn Sulaymān, with his epithet al-Jūzajānī indicating that he was from the Jowzjan, in what is now present day Afghanistan. He moved to Baghdad in his adulthood and studied under Muhammad al-Shaybani and Abu Yusuf, two students of the founder of the Hanafi school. After he had graduated, he gained the authorization to be a scholar of the Hanafi jurisprudence. The seventh Abbasid caliph, Al-Ma'mun, offered Al-Juzajani the position of qāḍī in the Abbasid court, but he politely declined the offer, feeling that the role of judging was not suitable for him. He died in 815 in his residence in Baghdad.

== Works ==
Al-Juzajani did not write any books of his own, but rather, he focused on writing abridged versions of his teacher Muhammad al-Shaybani's books with his own commentary. None of his works have survived to the present day. A portion of his commentaries, however, resurfaced in the library of Abu al-Wafa al-Afghani, who placed them in footnotes in the first volume of a 1966 publication of Kitāb al-Aṣl, one of Al-Shaybani's works on Hanafi jurisprudence.

== See also ==
- List of Hanafis
