= Madarik al-Tanzil =

Classical Sunni tafsir

Madārik al-Tanzīl
- Editor: Dr. Muhammad Darwish
- Author: Abū al-Barakāt al-Nasafī
- Original title: مدارك التنزيل وحقائق التأويل
- Language: Arabic
- Genre: Tafsir
- Publisher: Dār Taḥqīq al-Kitāb
- Publication date: 2018
- Publication place: Beirut, Lebanon
- Pages: 2024
- ISBN: 9789933925208

Madārik al-Tanzīl wa Ḥaqāʾiq al-Taʾwīl (Arabic: مدارك التنزيل وحقائق التأويل, lit. 'Gaining Revelation and Insight into Truth of Interpretations') is a classical Qurʾānic commentary by the Hanafi-Maturidi scholar Abū al-Barakāt ʿAbd Allāh ibn Aḥmad al-Nasafī (d. 710 AH / 1310 CE). It is concise yet comprehensive, synthesizing linguistic, theological, and juristic insights while maintaining clarity and moderation. Drawing upon earlier authorities such as al-Zamakhsharī and al-Bayḍāwī, al-Nasafī refines their approaches with precision. The tafsīr has been widely referenced in Hanafi scholarly circles and remains influential in the study of Sunni exegesis.

== Background ==
In the introduction of his book, commonly known as Tafsīr al-Nasafī or Madārik al-Tanzīl, the author states that he composed it at the request of an unnamed person and completed it within a short time. The prevalence of doctrines belonging to non-Sunni sects such as the Mu'tazila, Jahmiyya, and Karramiyya in the Transoxiana region during his time influenced his decision to write the work. Essentially, his aim was to support the creed of Ahl al-Sunna through Qur'ānic verses.

== Intellectual heritage ==
The principal source of Madārik al-Tanzīl is al-Zamakhsharī's al-Kashshāf. In interpreting certain verses, al-Nasafī made extensive quotations, sometimes pages long from al-Kashshāf, adapting them to his own style, while carefully removing al-Zamakhsharī's Muʿtazilite interpretations and at times criticizing them. However, the large number of quotations led to the view that Madārik al-Tanzīl is less an original tafsīr and more a concise version of al-Kashshāf, cleansed of its Muʿtazilite ideas.

Recognized by some scholars as a mujtahid within his school, al-Nasafī interpreted the verses of legal rulings (aḥkām) in accordance with Ḥanafī jurisprudence. However, in doing so he did not engage in independent reasoning (ijtihād), but usually confined himself to transmitting the views of Abū Ḥanīfa, Abū Yūsuf, Imām Muḥammad, and Zufar ibn al-Hudhayl. At times, he expressed the opinions of the school anonymously through phrases like “according to us” or “in our view,” and occasionally mentioned the opinions of the Shāfiʿī and Mālikī schools as well.

As a dirāyah (analytical, reason-based) commentary, Madārik al-Tanzīl also gives considerable attention to ḥadīths, the opinions of the Companions, and the Followers (Tabi'un), and transmitted reports. Among the Companions most frequently cited are ʿAbd Allāh ibn ʿAbbās and ʿAbd Allāh ibn Masʿūd, and among the Followers, al-Ḥasan al-Baṣrī, Mujāhid ibn Jabr, and Qatāda ibn Diʿāma. While there is no indication that the author was affiliated with any Sufi order, the work transmits wise sayings from early Sufi figures such as al-Ḥasan al-Baṣrī, Mālik ibn Dīnār, Ibrāhīm ibn Adham, Fuḍayl ibn ʿIyāḍ, Dhū al-Nūn al-Miṣrī, Junayd al-Baghdādī, and Sahl al-Tustarī.

The content of the work largely consists of linguistic and rhetorical explanations. Many of its philological analyses and interpretations are based on al-Zajjāj, while al-Nasafī also frequently refers to the explanations of the Basran grammarians Khalīl ibn Aḥmad and Sībawayh. In his interpretation and linguistic analysis of the verses, he sought to mention nearly all variant Qurʾānic readings (qirāʾāt), relying primarily on the ten canonical readings (qirāʾāt al-ʿashara), and occasionally including other variants attributed to the personal codices (maṣāḥif) of certain Companions.

== Methodology ==
Imām al-Nasafī's exegesis Madārik al-Tanzīl wa-Ḥaqāʾiq al-Taʾwīl, represents a comprehensive and systematic approach to Qurʾānic interpretation. The work integrates multiple branches of knowledge, uniting linguistic sciences including grammar, morphology, balagha, and Qurʾānic readings (qira'at) with jurisprudential, theological, and historical discussions. This integration demonstrates al-Nasafī's commitment to both precision and depth of analysis, producing a tafsīr that is simultaneously linguistic, legal, and theological in scope.

A central feature of al-Nasafī’s methodology is his careful extraction of juridical rulings (aḥkām) from linguistic cues and rhetorical expressions. These rulings are introduced primarily in the context of verses of legal significance (āyāt al-aḥkām). He presents the range of scholarly opinions among the fuqahāʾ (jurists) and aʾimmah (leading scholars), noting differences in interpretation and providing brief explanations of their linguistic or exegetical reasoning. Where appropriate, he expresses a preference for the strongest or most authentic position, consistently aligning with the principles of the Ḥanafī school.

Al-Nasafī maintains a balance between various interpretive approaches. He avoids excessive allegorical interpretation as well as disruptive rationalism, instead adopting the measured methods of both the mufassirīn (exegetes) and mutakallimīn (theologians). His tafsīr carefully integrates hadith, citing them contextually and explaining their relevance concisely, while avoiding weakly transmitted reports (daʿīf) and Isrāʾīliyyāt (biblical legends). Similarly, he refrains from overemphasizing the virtues of the Muslim community except where warranted by the Qurʾānic context, particularly in legal verses. Although in its treatment of theological (kalām) verses Madārik al-Tanzīl favours the doctrines of the Māturīdī school, it does not criticize the Ashʿarī school, nor does it discuss the differences between the two.

The tafsīr is also notable for its attention to subtle rhetorical nuances, demonstrating mastery of balāghah (eloquence) and bayān (expression). By uniting scholarly precision with delicate rhetorical insight, al-Nasafī creates a tafsīr praised for its attentiveness, refined reasoning, and meticulous verification. It remains a model of comprehensive interpretation that harmonizes creed (ʿaqīdah), jurisprudence (fiqh), theology (tawḥīd), and Arabic sciences without succumbing to speculative or deviant views.

== Reception ==
The scholarly reception of al-Nasafī’s tafsīr reflects widespread recognition of his adherence to traditional Sunni orthodoxy and his refined literary style. As al-Ḥanafī observes:

“As for al-Nasafī, he adhered firmly to the path of the pious predecessors (salaf al-ṣāliḥ) and remained loyal to the creed of Ahl al-Sunnah wa al-Jamāʿah. He also stood firmly in opposition to the people of innovation (ahl al-bidʿah) and misguidance (ahwāʾ). His tafsīr combines eloquence and subtlety in expression, abundant in fine meanings and delicate indications. Within it, one can find traces of theological and rhetorical precision.”

== Editions ==
Numerous manuscript copies of the work exist, especially in the Süleymaniye Library and other libraries both in and outside Turkey. Beginning in 1862, it has been printed in Istanbul. Egypt, Beirut, Delhi, and Bombay (Brockelmann, GAL, II, 252; Suppl., II, 267; Çetiner, pp. 44–49). The work was also published in three volumes under the supervision of Ibrāhīm Muḥammad Ramadān (Beirut 1408/1989) and in four volumes edited by Shaykh Marwān Muḥammad al-Shaʿʿār (Beirut 1416/1996).

== See also ==
- List of Sunni books
- List of tafsir works

== Critical studies ==
- Nesma Hijazi (22 June 2022). "The Homonym and Its Impact in the Exegesis of Imām al-Nasafī (d. 710 AH): Madārik al-Tanzīl wa Ḥaqā'iq al-Ta'wīl". Journal of Shari'a Sciences and Islamic Studies. 2 (1). Al Qasimia University: 45–47. doi:10.52747/aqujssis.2.1.60. eISSN 2788-5534. ISSN 2788-5526.
- Shaimāʾ Abū al-Ḥasan Ibrāhīm Shaimāʾ (October 2025). "Imām al-Nasafī's Interpretive Deductions in the Qur'an as Reflected in His Tafsīr Madārik al-Tanzīl wa Ḥaqā'iq al-Ta'wīl: A Study of Sūrat al-Fātiḥah". Journal of Language and Literature. 16 (16). Minya University: 182–193. doi:10.21608/mala.2023.247436.1280.
- Nevriye Sümeyra Çalık (18 October 2024). "The Use of Qur'ānic Verses as Evidence (Istishhād) in al-Nasafī's Madārik al-Tanzīl wa Ḥaqā'iq al-Ta'wīl". RumeliDE Dil ve Edebiyat Araştırmaları Dergisi (39). Yozgat Bozok University: 795–806. doi:10.29000/rumelide.1470149.
- Mu'id al-Nasir Husayn al-Surji, Muhammad Khalid Mustafa al-Gahardi (29 April 2024). "A Critical Study and Edition of al-Mullā Ṣāliḥ al-Kūzah Bānki's Marginal Commentary Idrāk al-Madārik ʿalā Madārik al-Tanzīl wa Ḥaqā'iq al-Ta'wīl on Verses 88–97 of Sūrat al-Nisāʾ". Basic Sciences Journal. 10 (17). University of Wasit. doi:10.31185/bsj.Vol10.Iss17.459. ISSN 2306-5249.
