= Radd al-Muhtar =

Book by Ibn 'Abidin

Radd al-Muhtār 'ala al-Durr al-Mukhtār (Arabic: رد المحتار على الدر المختار) is a book on Islamic jurisprudence (fiqh) by 18th century Islamic scholar, Ibn 'Abidin, whose title translates to "Guiding the Baffled to The Exquisite Pearl".

Radd al-Muhtar is a "hashiyah" (an annotative commentary) on `Ala' al-Din al-Haskafi's work of Islamic jurisprudence, Durr al-Mukhtār fi Sharh Tanwīr al-Absār. It is widely considered as the central reference for fatwa in the Hanafi school of Sunni legal interpretation. Scholars of the Indian subcontinent often refer to Ibn Abidin as "al-Shami" and to this hashiyah as "al-Shamiyya" or "Fatawa Shami".

This voluminous work has been translated into various languages, including Turkish and Urdu.

The Arabic Edition comprises eight volumes, As a whole, the text covers a wide range of topics within Muslim law, including the five pillars of Islam, marriage, divorce, trade, jihad, inheritance, and other facets of Muslim life.
