= Salah Abu al-Haj =

Jordanian Islamic scholar (born 1974)

Shaykh Salah Abu al-Haj
- صلاح أبو الحاج
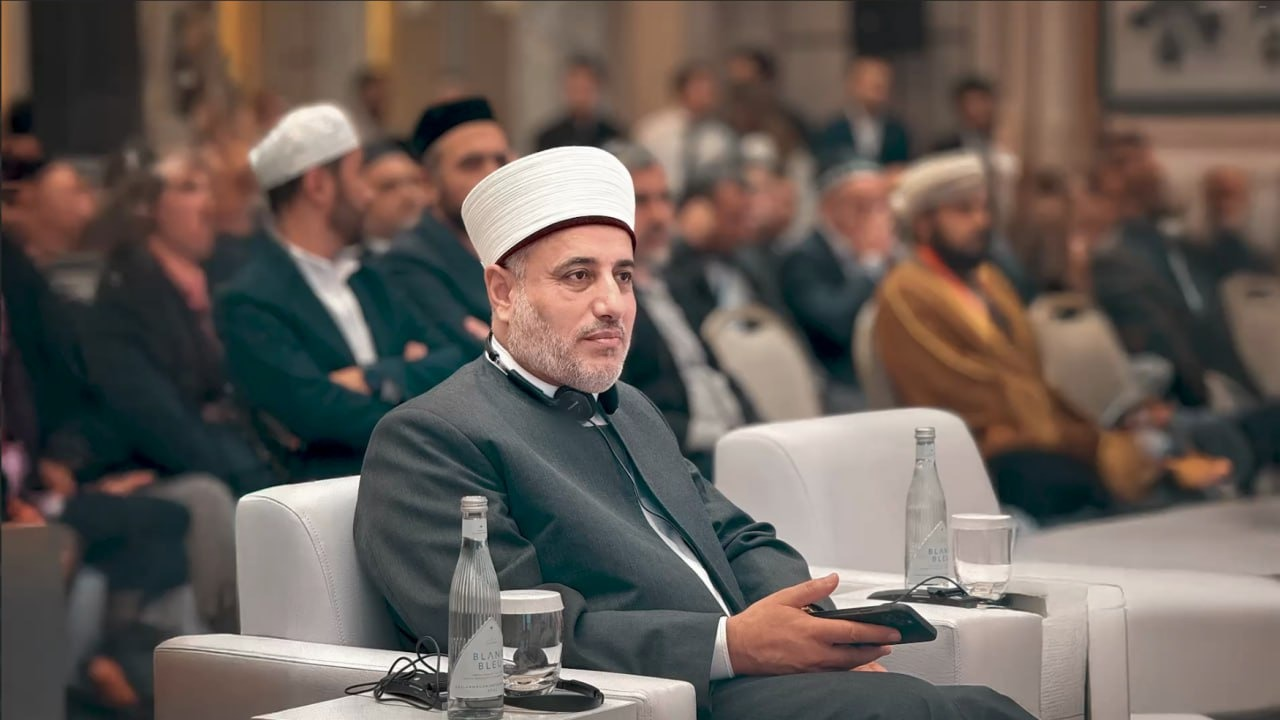
- Salah Abu al-Haj in 2025

Personal life
- Born: Salah Muhammad Salim Abu al-Haj; 24 July 1974 (age 51) Amman, Jordan
- Era: Modern
- Main interest: Islamic jurisprudence
- Education: University of Baghdad
- Occupation: Islamic scholar

Religious life
- Religion: Islam
- Denomination: Sunni
- Jurisprudence: Hanafi

Salah Muhammad Salim Abu al-Haj (Arabic: صلاح محمد سالم أبو الحاج, romanized: Ṣalāḥ Muḥammad Sālim ʾAbu al-Ḥāj; born 24 July 1974) is a Jordanian Islamic scholar and researcher. He is considered one of the leading scholars on Hanafi jurisprudence.

== Biography ==
Salah Muhammad Salim Abu al-Haj was born on 24 July 1974 in Amman, Jordan. He earned a bachelor's degree from the College of Dawah and Fundamentals of Religion and obtained his master's and doctoral degrees from the University of Baghdad in Baghdad, Iraq. His teachers include Shaykh Abd al-Malik al-Sa'di.

Abu al-Haj served as assistant professor at Al-Balqa Applied University from 2004 to 2010. He later became Dean of Hanafi Jurisprudence at the World Islamic Science and Education University in Jordan and currently serves in the position.

== Books ==
Abu al-Haj is the author of at least over 30 works as of 2025. Some of them include:

- al-Fiqh al-Muqāran
- Is'ad al-Mufti
- Al-Madkhal al-Mufassal ila al-Fiqh al-Hanafi
- Removing the Confusion
