= Allamah =

Arabic Islamic honorific meaning "learned"

Allamah or Allama (Arabic: عَلَّامَة) is an Islamic honorary title for a profound scholar, a polymath, a man of vast reading and erudition, or a great learned one.

The title is carried by scholars of Islamic fiqh (jurisprudence) and philosophy. It is used as an honorific in Sunni Islam as well as in Shia Islam, mostly in South Asia, the Middle East and Iran. Sunnis and Shias who have achieved scholarship in several disciplines are often referred to by the title. It is also used for philosophers, such as Allama Iqbal.

== See also ==
- Abu al-Barakat al-Nasafi
- Habib al-Rahman al-A'zami
- Shaykh al-Islām
- Seghatoleslam
- List of ayatollahs
- List of maraji
