= Burhan-ud-din Kermani =

Persian physician

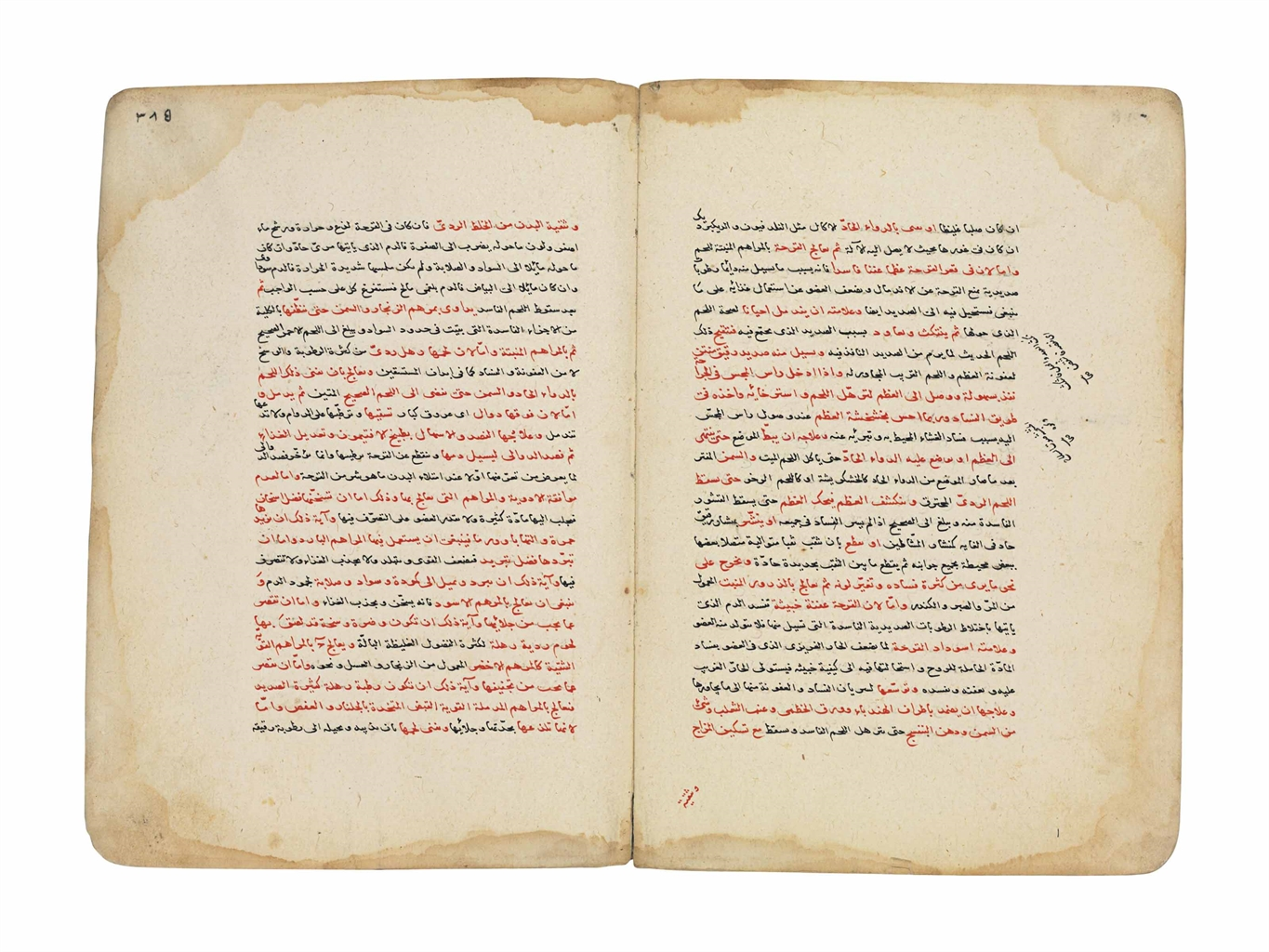
An early copy of Kirmani's Sharh Mujiz al-Qanun fi al-Tibb li-Ibn Sina. Created in Iran, dated 1471-72

Burhān al-Din Nafīs ibn ‘Iwad al-Kirmanī (Persian: برهان الدین نفیس بن عوض بن حکیم کرمانی), better known as Burhan-ud-Din Kermani, was a 15th-century Persian physician from Kerman. He was court physician to Ulugh Beg, the grandson of Tamerlane and the governor of Samarqand from 1409 to 1449.

== Life ==
Kirmani was born in Kerman. His father and other ancestors were renowned physicians. He finished his medical education in Kerman and worked as a physician there. His fame and fortune were so vast that Ulugh Beg, a Timurid king, requested his presence in Samarqand, and made him his special physician. During his stay in Samarqand, he taught medicine to students and wrote a number of books about medicine, some of which took so long that he finished them after he returned to Kerman. He is an ancestor to the Naficy/Nafisi/Nafissi family.

In 1424, Kirmani dedicated to Ulugh Beg his commentary on the medical compendium of Najib al-Din al-Samarqandi, and in 1437 he again dedicated to Ulugh Beg his popular commentary on The Canon of Medicine of Avicenna.

Kirmani's commentary on Najib al-Din al-Samarqandi's treatise was so popular that commentaries were written on the commentary, and it was translated into Persian and amplified by Muqim Arzani in the 18th century.

He is the first to describe "Cardiopulmonary Resuscitation" (CPR), in ancient Persia, as a combination of "strong movements and massive chest expansion" (for induction and support of breathing), and "compression of left side of the chest" (equivalent of cardiac compression).

He died in 1449.

== His works ==
1. Sharh Mujaz al-Qanun li Ibn Sina fi al-Tibb, which he completed in 841 H.E., written in Arabic.

2. Sharh al-Asbab wa al-'Alamat, written in Arabic.

3. Sharh al-Amrad al-Juz'iyah of Hippocrates' Kitab al-Fusul, written in Arabic.

== See also ==
- List of Iranian scientists

== Sources ==
For life and works see:

- Albert Dietrich, Medicinalia Arabica: Studien über arabische medizinische Handschriften in türkischen und syrischen Bibliotheken, Abhandlungen der Akademie der Wissenschaften in G?ttingen, philologisch-historische Klasse, Dritte Folge, No. 66, (G?ttingen: Vandenhoeck & Ruprecht, 1966), pp. 122–124 no. 52
- C. Brockelmann, Geschichte der arabischen Litteratur, 1st edition, 2 vols. (Leiden: Brill, 1889-1936). Second edition, 2 vols. (Leiden: Brill, 1943–49). Page references will be to those of the first edition, with the 2nd edition page numbers given in parentheses, vol. 2, p. 213 (276).
- Majid Dadmehr, Mohsen Bahrami: Chest compression for syncope in medieval Persia, European Heart Journal, Volume 39, Issue 29, 1 August 2018, Pages 2700–2701
