= Salman Nadwi =

Indian scholar and professor in the Islamic sciences (1954–2026)

Maulana Salman Husaini Nadwi
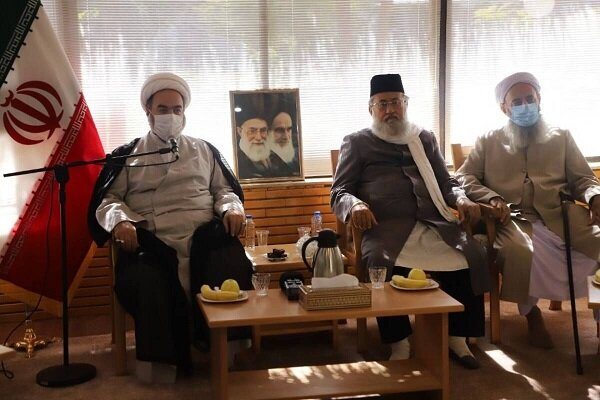
- Nadwi with Abdolhamid Ismaeelzahi and Mustafa Mahami in Iran, 2023
- Title: Aalim , Mufassir e Quran

Personal life
- Born: 1954 Lucknow, Uttar Pradesh, India
- Died: 29 June 2026 (aged 72) Lucknow, Uttar Pradesh, India
- Cause of death: Heart attack
- Home town: Mansoorpur, Muzaffarnagar district, Uttar Pradesh, India
- Occupation: Islamic scholar, professor, author, writer

Religious life
- Religion: Islam
- Denomination: Sunni Islam
- Jurisprudence: Hanafi
- Movement: Deobandi
- Profession: Former teacher of Darul Uloom Nadwatul Ulama Lucknow Uttar Pradesh India

Muslim leader
- Influenced by: Abul Hasan Ali Hasani Nadwi

Salman Hussaini Nadwi (1954 – 29 June 2026) was an Indian scholar and professor in the Islamic sciences. He was an author of numerous scholarly works in Arabic and Urdu. Salman Nadwi served as the Dean of the Faculty of Dawah at the Darul Uloom Nadwatul Ulama madrasa in Lucknow.

Nadwi served as the chairman of the Dr. Abdul Ali Unani Medical College and Hospital, Chancellor of Darul Uloom Syed Ahmad Shaheed – Katoli, President of Jamiat Shabaab ul Islam. In addition, he was a founding member of numerous medical, IT and engineering colleges in India. Salman Nadwi was also the editor and co-editor of thirteen different periodicals in English, Urdu, Persian and Arabic languages published in India and abroad.

== Early life and education ==
Salman Nadwi was born in 1954, in the city of Lucknow. His ancestral hometown is Mansurpur, Muzaffarnagar district, Uttar Pradesh. His lineage can be traced back to Muhammad's grandson Husayn ibn Ali. His mother was the niece of the Indian Islamic scholar Abul Hasan Ali Hasani Nadwi, from whom Salman Nadwi benefited greatly.

He memorised the Qur'an in 1961. After completing a middle school level education of Islamic studies, he matriculated to a graduate program at the college of Shari'ah and Usul al-Din in Darul Uloom Nadwatul Ulama. After graduation in 1974, he, alongside a group of other graduates, established the Jam'iat Shabab al-Islam (Organization of the Youth of Islam), an organisation that is considered today to be one of the largest and most active Islamic organisations in India.

Nadwi completed a master's degree in Hadith from Darul Uloom Nadwatul Ulama in 1976. In 1977, he enrolled in the master's program at the Imam Muhammad ibn Saud Islamic University in Riyadh. He completed his master's degree there with honours in 1980. His master's dissertation was supervised by Abd al-Fattah Abu Ghudda.

== Career ==
After completing his education, Nadwi joined Darul Uloom Nadwatul Ulama as a faculty member and later became dean of its Faculty of Dawah and Shariah.

He founded the Madrasat al-Imam Ahmad ibn 'Irfan al-Shahid al-Islamiyyah in 1975.

== Sunni Muslim army ==
In July 2014, Firstpost reported that Husaini wrote a letter to the Saudi government offering to raise a 500,000-strong militia of Sunni Muslim Indian youth that would be a part of a powerful global Islamic army. The army, he proposed, would fight Shia militants in Iraq, would "help Muslims in need" elsewhere and would become part of a Caliphate that he wanted Saudis to set up for the Muslim ummah, the international Muslim community.

== Death ==
Nadwi died at his residence in Lucknow on 29 June 2026, at the age of 72. His funeral prayer was led by his son, Yusuf Husaini Nadwi, and he was buried in the premises of Jamia Syed Ahmad Shaheed at Katauli, Malihabad.

== See also ==
- Rabey Hasani Nadvi
- Abul Hasan Ali Hasani Nadwi
- Syed Sulaiman Nadvi
