= Al-Zarnuji =

Burhan al-Din al-Zarnuji or Burhan al-Islam al-Zarnuji also spelled az-Zarnuji (d. 620 AH/1223 CE) was a Muslim scholar and the author of the celebrated pedagogical work Ta'līm al-Muta'allim-Ṭarīq at-Ta'-allum (Instruction of the Student: The Method of Learning).

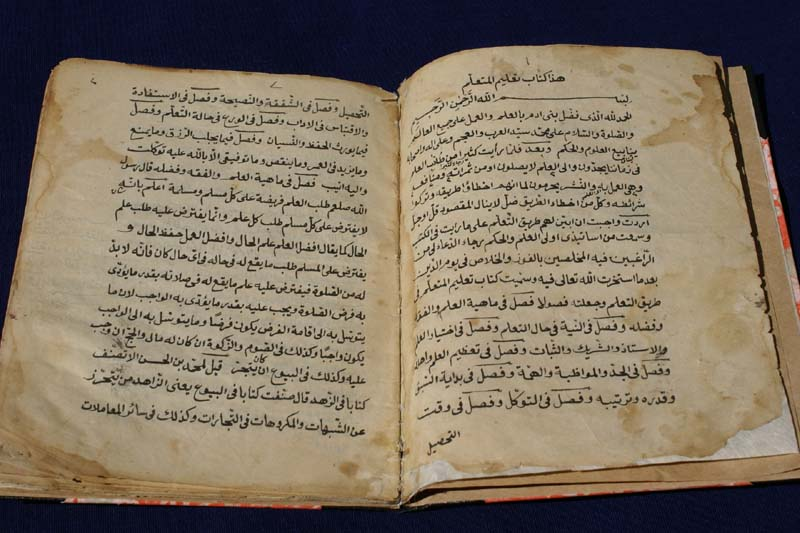
A manuscript of al-Zarnuji's Ta'līm al-Muta'allim-Ṭarīq at-Ta'-allum

== Life ==
Al-Zarnuji was born and lived in Zarnuj, a well-known town beyond the river Oxus (Amu Darya) in the present Turkistan Region of Kazakhstan. Burhan al-Din (proof of Din) or Burhan al-Islam (proof of Islam) al-Zarnuji were his agnomen, or moniker. Collections of biographers believed that his given name was al-Nu'man ibn Ibrahim.

He studied with many shaykhs including: Shaykh Burhān al-Dīn ‘Alī ibn Abī Bakr al-Marghīnānī (530–593 AH / 1135–1197 CE) author of Al-Hidāyah, Shaykh Abu al-Muhamid Qawaduddin Hammad ibn Ibrahim al-Saffar; the great Shaykh Hasan ibn Mansur Qadiykhani; and others.

The exact date of his death is unknown, though it is speculated that he died in 593 AH (1223 CE) in Bukhara.

== Works ==
Al-Zarnuji's treatise, Ta'līm al-Muta'allim-Ṭarīq at-Ta'-allum (Instruction of the Student: The Method of Learning), is a short work on the methods and ethics of learning. It gives guidance to both students and teachers of Islamic law.
