= Al-Sarakhsi =

11th-century Hanafi scholar and jurist

Abu Bakr al-Sarakhsi
- أبو بکر محمد بن أبي سهل السرخسي
- Title: The sun of the leaders (شمس الأئمة)

Personal life
- Born: Sarakhs
- Died: 483 Hijri (1090 CE)
- Era: Islamic golden age
- Region: Greater Khorasan
- Main interests: Jurisprudence; Usul al-Fiqh
- Notable work(s): Al-Mabsut, Usul al-Sarakhsi, Shar al-Siyar al-Kabir

Religious life
- Religion: Islam
- Denomination: Sunni
- Jurisprudence: Hanafi

Muslim leader
- Influenced by: Abu Hanifa Al-Halwani
- Influenced: Al-Kasani Burhan al-Din al-Marghinani Abu al-Barakat al-Nasafi Ibn Abidin

Muhammad b. Ahmad b. Abi Sahl Abu Bakr al-Ansari al-Sarakhsi (Arabic: محمد بن احمد بن ابي سهل ابو بكر الأنصاري السرخسي), was a Sunni Muslim jurist and also an Islamic scholar of the Hanafi school of thought. He was traditionally known as Shams al-A'imma (شمس الأئمة; transl. The sun of the leaders).

He is an influential jurist in the Hanafi school where the tradition is reported to have been that: "when in doubt, follow Sarakhsi". Both Al-Kasani and Burhan al-Din al-Marghinani, in their flagship fiqh books of Bada'i' al-Sana'i' and Al-Hidaya, have extensively drawn upon the discussions and legal reasonings presented in al-Sarakhsi's Al-Mabsut and Usul al-Sarakhsi.

The Indian Muslim scholar of the 19th century, Abd al-Hayy al-Lucknawi, classifies al-Sarakhsi in the second grade of mujtahids, along with scholars such as Al-Tahawi, who are believed to be the seminal jurists after Abu Hanifa's students (i.e. Abu Yusuf and Muhammad al-Shaybani).

== Background Information ==
Al-Sarakhsi was born in Sarakhs, a city in Greater Khorasan, which is presently located at the border between Iran and Turkmenistan. He died in 483/1090 or in 490/1096, according to different sources.

He studied under the great Hanafi jurist, 'Abd al-'Aziz al-Halwani (d. 448/1056) who was also a teacher to Al-Bazdawi.

Not much is known about his early life, though some clues are found in his works. It is said that al-Sarakhsi was imprisoned due to his opinion on a juristic matter concerning a ruler; he criticized the king by questioning the validity of his marriage to a slave woman. He spent around fifteen years in prison. While he was imprisoned he wrote the Mabsut and some of his other most important works. He is known for his remarkable memory, (he was able to recall many texts when he was held in prison) as well as his intelligence.

Al-Sarakhsi's opinions on law have been widely cited and he has been thought of as a distinctive writer. His main works are the Usul al-Fiqh, the Kitab al-Mabsut, and the Sharh al-Siyar al-Kabir.

== Important works ==
Al-Sarakhsi's most important works are

- Usul al-Fiqh
- Kitab al-Mabsut
- Sharh al-Siyar al-Kabir.

=== Usul al-Fiqh ===
This work deals with Islamic jurisprudence and the exercise of ra’y in systematic reasoning and juristic preference. To write this work, al-Sarakhsi incorporated information from many different sources, including Abu’l-Hasan al-Karkhi, Ahmad b. Muhammad al-Shashi, al-Djassas, Abū ʿAbdullāh Muhammad ibn Idrīs al-Shafiʿī and major works from the other law traditions.

=== Kitab al-Mabsut ===
Al-Sarakhsi's Mabsut is a commentary on the mukhtasar (epitome) by Muhammad b. Muhammad al-Marwazi, which in turn summarized some of the foundational texts of the Hanafi school written by Muhammad al-Shaybani. Al-Shaybani was a companion of Abū Ḥanīfah, the founder of the Hanafi school. In his Mabsut, Al-Sarakhsi reworks many of the concepts from al-Shaybani's works. He organized his work around points of scholarly divergence (ikhtilaf) and incorporated more information from the Hanafi school, as well as other schools of law. The Mabsut is well-organized, covers topics comprehensively, explores points of dispute thoroughly, and manipulates hermeneutical argument well. These factors make the Mabsut a very influential piece of juristic literature: it was an important work of furū‘ in the Hanafi school until the 19th century. (The furū‘, literally “branches”, are particular legal rulings built upon the usūl, or “roots”, which are the Principles of Islamic jurisprudence.) Its significance in earlier times is reflected in the statement of the 15th-century Hanafi jurist, 'Ala' al-Din al-Tarabulusi (d. 1440): “Whoever memorizes al-Mabsut and the doctrine of the ancient scholars becomes thereby a mujtahid." Al-Sarakhsi deals with many themes in his Mabsut, these include juristic preference, the legality of doing activities with illegally obtained objects, zakat (alms tax, one of the Five Pillars of Islam) and land reclamation.
In the Mabsut he defines the doctrine of istihsān, or juristic preference, as the "abandonment of the opinion to which reasoning by the doctrine of ...systematic reasoning would lead, in favor of a different opinion support by stronger evidence and adapted to what is accommodating to the people. Thereby, Sarakhsi neither undermines the importance of the exercise of the doctrine of systematic reasoning nor rejects it in any sense." In addition, al-Sarakhsi deals with the dilemma of doing a legal activity with an illegally obtained object, opining that the fact that the object was obtained illegally does not mean that the legal activity becomes illegal. Al-Sarakhsi also deals with issues concerning zakat in the Mabsut. For example, if the collector comes and a person denies that something is taxable, he does not have to pay the tax on that item, since it is a duty to God. This is explained in the following passage from the Mabsut, which is quoted in Classical Islam: A Sourcebook of Religious Literature, by Norman Calder, Jawid Ahmad Mojaddedi, and Andrew Rippin:

"He then swears that this is so. He is believed in all cases. This is because he is responsible for zakat duties that are obligatory on him. Zakat is an act of worship purely for the sake of God, and the word of a responsible person is always acceptable in regard to acts of worship that are obligatory as being due to God."

Al-Sarakhsi also mentions the views of Abu Hanifa on land reclamation. This passage is from al-Sarakhsi's Mabsut, as quoted by Sherman A. Jackson:

“'In the view of Abu Hanifa, God show him mercy, reclaimed land becomes the property of one who restores it only after he receives permission from the Imam'... Al-Sarakhsi goes on to explain Abu Hanifa's reasoning. Abu Hanifa relied on the statement of
the Prophet 'A person may have only that which his Imam is content with giving him.' This statement even if it is general, [is for him probative] since he maintains that statements universally accepted as general take precedence over those that are specific. Then the Prophet said, ‘... except desolate plots of land; for these belong to God, His messenger then to you.' Now, that
which has been designated as God's and His messenger's falls under the jurisdiction of the Imam. It is thus not permissible for anyone to act independently regarding such things without the latter's permission, just as is maintained in the case of the one-
fifth portion of booty.... And the Prophet's statement, 'Whoever reclaims a desolate plot of land ...’ merely clarifies the fact-
which we accept-that the means by which one gains ownership over restored land is reclamation, after he obtains permission from
the Imam. The Imam's permission remains a necessary precondition in all of this".

=== Sharh al-Siyar al-Kabir ===
This work is a commentary on the Kitab al-Siyar al-kabir of al-Shaybani. It demonstrates the role of juristic preference in sharia law. The Sharh al-Siyar al-Kabir shows the same widespread coverage, the development of rules and careful consideration of hermeneutical argument that is seen in the Mabsut.

== Death ==
He died in the year 490 AH, or it was said in the year 483 AH, and his tomb still stands in the city of Uzgend in Kyrgyzstan.

== See also ==
- Muhammad al-Shaybani
- Sharia
- Hanafi
