= Musnad Abi Hanifa =

Musnad Imam Abu Hanifa
- Author: Imam Abu Hanifa
- Language: Arabic
- Genre: Hadith collection

Musnad Abu Hanifa (Arabic: مسند أبو حنيفة) is one of the collection of sayings of Islamic scholar Imam Abu Hanifa (80 AH- 150 AH).

== Description ==
It contains almost five hundred (500) hadiths. This is one of the earliest known extant Hadith collections, only predated by the Sahifah of Hammam Ibn Munabbih

== Publications ==
The book has been published by many publishers across the globe:

- Musnad Imam Abu Hanifah (r.a): Published:Book on Demand (1 Jan. 1901)
- Musnad Imam Ul a Zam Abu Hanifah R.a: Published:Book on Demand Pod

== See also ==
- List of Sunni books
- Musnad al-Shafi'i
- Musnad Ahmad ibn Hanbal
- Muwatta Malik
- Kutub al-Sittah
- Majma al-Zawa'id
