= Al-Tamartashi =

Muḥammad ibn ʿAbd Allāh al-Tamartāshī
- محمد بن عبد الله التمرتاشي

Personal life
- Born: 939 AH / 1532 CE Gaza
- Died: 1004 AH / 1598 CE Gaza

Religious life
- Religion: Islam
- Jurisprudence: Hanafi
- Creed: Maturidi

Muḥammad ibn ʿAbd Allāh ibn Aḥmad Shams al-Dīn al-Khaṭīb al-Tamartāshī (Arabic: محمد بن عبد الله التمرتاشي; 939–1004 AH / 1532–1598 CE) was a Hanafi jurist, legal theorist, and Islamic scholar from Gaza, where he was born and lived most of his life. Commonly referred to as al-Tamartāshī al-Ghazzī, he also travelled periodically, pursuing his academic studies in Syrian and Egyptian cities, like Aleppo, Hamah, Damascus and Cairo.

Regarded by later biographers as one of the leading Hanafi authorities of Ottoman Palestine in the 16th century, he is best known for his jurisprudential work Al-Durr al-Mukhtar, which became a foundational text within the later Hanafi legal tradition. Al-Tamartāshī died in Gaza in 1004 AH (1596 CE) at the age of sixty-five.

== Life and career ==
Al-Tamartāshī was a legal scholar, teacher, and mufti from an early age, having served as a mufti in Gaza during his youth. He travelled for study and scholarly exchange, visiting Cairo on four occasions and travelling throughout the cities of the region of Syria. He studied under leading scholars of his time, including Hanafi jurist Zayn al-Din Ibn Nujaym in Cairo, who became his principal teacher. He also studied with Shams al-Dīn Ibn al-Mashriqī al-Ghazzī, the Shafiʿi mufti of Gaza, and with other prominent scholars in Egypt and Syria.

Later biographers describe him as eloquent in speech and writing, accomplished in poetry, and skilled in scholarly disputation across multiple disciplines.

== Scholarship ==
Al-Tamartāshī was trained in jurisprudence, legal theory (uṣūl al-fiqh), theology (kalām), and Arabic grammar. He is described as adhering to the Hanafi school without sectarian rigidity and as presenting differing juristic opinions with objectivity and careful analysis.

According to the Syrian Arab Encyclopedia and Khair al-Din al-Zirikli, al-Tamartāshī authored numerous works in jurisprudence, legal theory, theology, grammar, and devotional literature. He was a prolific author, composing some 40 works, but several of them were not completed.

Al-Durr al-Mukhtar became al-Tamartāshī's most influential work and was widely commented upon. Later Hanafi scholars who wrote glosses or commentaries on it include ʿAlāʾ al-Dīn al-Ḥaṣkafī and Khayr al-Din al-Ramli.

A copy of Fatawa al-Tumurtashi, a collection of fatwas authored by al-Tamartashi, was made in Homs, Syria in 1696 (1107 AH), and is held in the Egyptian Collection as Manuscript 67. It includes his work Kitab al-Taharah ("The book on ritual purity) as well as a section entitled Fasl min Masa’il Mutafarriqat ("On miscellaneous issues"). In the work he mentions Gaza with its honorific "Ghazzat Hashim", referencing the great-grandfather of the prophet Muhammad.

Other works he authored include:

- Tanwīr al-Abṣār wa-Jāmiʿ al-Biḥār, Hanafi jurisprudence
- al-Fatāwā, a two-volume collection of legal opinions, arranged according to al-Hidāyah
- Muʿīn al-Muftī ʿalā Jawāb al-Mustaftī, guidance for jurists and muftis
- Iʿānat al-Ḥaqīr li-Zād al-Faqīr, commentary on the work of Ibn al-Humam
- Mawāhib al-Mannān, jurisprudence
- al-Aqrān, a juridical poem, with its commentary Mawāhib al-Raḥmān
- al-Wuṣūl ilā Qawāʿid al-Uṣūl, legal theory
- ʿAqd al-Jawāhir al-Nayyirāt fī Bayān Khaṣāʾiṣ al-ʿAsharah al-Thiqāt al-Mubashsharīn bi-l-Jannah
- Kitab al Ghasb ("Book of violation")
- Treatise on recitation behind the imam
- Treatise on the infallibility of the prophets
- Treatise on entering bathhouses
- Treatise on wiping over leather socks
- Treatise on deputizing in the Friday sermon
- Treatises on Sufism
- Treatises on Arabic morphology (ṣarf)
- Grammatical commentaries, including works on texts by Al-Sharif al-Jurjani
