= Al-Durr al-Mukhtar =

11th Century Arabic textbook

Al-Durr al-Mukhtar Sharh Tanwir al-Absar (Arabic: الدر المختار شرح تنوير الأبصار, commonly referred to as Durr ul-Mukhtar (lit. "the chosen pearl", also spelled Durr al-Mukhtar) is a book written by Imam Muhammad Ala-ud-Din Haskafi in the year 1070 AH. The book is actually the commentary of another book by the name of Tanwir al-Absar written by al-Tamartashi.

== Description ==
It is considered to be one of the most prominent treatises of the Hanafi school of thought. The author of the book mainly discusses the topics, Marriage, Dower, Talaq (Divorce), Rights and obligations of spouses, Talqah, Wakf, Gift, Will and Inheritance. It has been referred to by almost all the modern day writers on the Islamic Law and Shariah in India, Pakistan, Afghanistan and Bangladesh. This book give useful information to the Judges, Lawyers, Scholars and students of Islamic Shariah.

== Translation and Publications ==
The book is basically in Arabic and has been translated into many languages across the globe.

- Durr al-mukhtār sharḥ Tanwīr al-abṣār, Published: Dār al-Kutub al-‘Ilmīyah, 2002, Bayrūt
- Al-durr al-mukhtar sharh tanwir al-absar, (English Translation)

== See also ==
- List of Sunni books
