= Musnad al-Shafi'i =

Hadith collection attributed to al-Shafi'i

- Author: Abū ʿAbdullāh Muhammad ibn Idrīs Al-Shafi‘i
- Original title: مسند الشافعي
- Language: Arabic
- Genre: Hadith collection
- Publication place: Caliphate

Musnad al-Shafi'i (Arabic: مسند الشافعي, romanized: Musnad al-Shāfiʿī) is a hadith collection attributed to Islamic scholar al-Shafi‘i.

Shah Abd Al-Aziz Ad-Dehlawi writes “This Musnad is used to designate the marfū’ hadīth which ash-Shāfi’ī related to his companions. Those of them which reached Abul-'Abbas Muhammad ibn Ya’qūb al-Asamm from what he heard from Rabi' ibn Sulaymān of the Kitāb al-Umm and al-Mabsūt were collected by him in one place; he called it the Musnad ash-Shāfi’ī.

== Description ==
The book contains almost two thousand (2000) hadiths according to Al-Maktaba Al-Shamela. It is one of the oldest Musnad (a kind of Hadith book) written. The Musnad (مسند) are collections of Hadiths which are classified by narrators, and therefore by Sahabas (companions of Muhammad). The collection is not directly the work of the Imam, but rather it was written by later scholars who were students of al-Rabi', the inheritor of al-Shafi'i as ibn Hajar al-'Asqalani explains.

Shah Abd Al-Azīz Ad-Dehlawi writes “Rabi' Ibn Sulaymān kept the company of ash-Shāfi’ī, took from him, and listened to all but four hadīth from the first section which al-Buwayti related from ash-Shafi’ī.

This Musnad is not arranged in the same order as the Musnads nor is it arranged in chapters. He collected it without any order or organisation. There were a lot of repetitions in it.”

== Publications ==
The book has been published by many organizations around the world:

- Sharh Musnad al-Shafi'i 4 VOLUMES (شرح مسند الشافعي) by Imam Abu al-Qasim al-Rafi'i: Published: Dar al-Nawadir | Syria-Lebanon-Kuwait
- Musnad al-Imam Muhammad Ibn Idris al-Shafi'i: Published: Dar al-Basha'ir al-Islamiyyah (Beirut, Lebanon)
- Musnad Al-Imam Al-Shafi'i: Published: Gheras Publishing (2004)

== See also ==
- Kitab al-Umm
- Al-Risala (Al-Shafi‘i)
- List of Sunni books
- Musnad Abu Hanifa
- Musnad Ahmad ibn Hanbal
- Muwatta Malik
- Kutub al-Sittah
