= Abu Tahir Multani =

Hanafi jurist

Abū Ṭāhir al-Multānī was a 14th/15th century Hanafi jurist and the author of a widely used treatise on Hanafi jurisdiction in Persian, 'Umdat al-Islam. Manuscripts of the work give his father's name as Kamal while he himself is sometimes known as Abd al-Aziz and Abd Allah.

The text entered in the Chinese Islamic tradition shortly after its composition in 14th century by Multani, and remained influential thereafter for Hui Muslims. The work was translated into Ottoman Turkish by ʿAbd al-Raḥmān b. Yūsuf Āqsarāyī in 1543 as ʿImād al-Islām. Chaghatai Turkic translations of the work, albeit with some modifications, also exist.

A grammatical treatise, al-Miṣbāḥ fī naḥw, is also attributed to Multani, which circulated in China and a copy of which in the Dongsi Mosque in Beijing dates to 1588. The Persian texts titled Multaqiṭ al-khiṭāb and Tadhkira-yi wāqiʿāt attributed to Multani are actually copies of his 'Umdat al-Islam.
