= Ali al-Qari =

Afghan Sufi scholar (died 1605/06)

Ali al-Qari علي القاري
- Title: Mulla (Grand scholar)

Personal life
- Born: 1524 (930 AH) Herat, Safavid Iran (present-day Afghanistan)
- Died: 1605/06 (1014 AH) Mecca, Ottoman Empire (present-day Saudi Arabia)
- Region: Khurasan and Makkah
- Main interest(s): Islamic Jurisprudence, Hadith, Theology
- Notable work(s): Mirqat al-Mafatih, Minah al-Rawd al-Azhar, Al-Hizb al-A'zam

Religious life
- Religion: Islam
- Denomination: Sunni
- Jurisprudence: Hanafi
- Creed: Maturidi

Muslim leader
- Influenced by: Abu Hanifa, Abu Mansur al-Maturidi, al-Ghazali

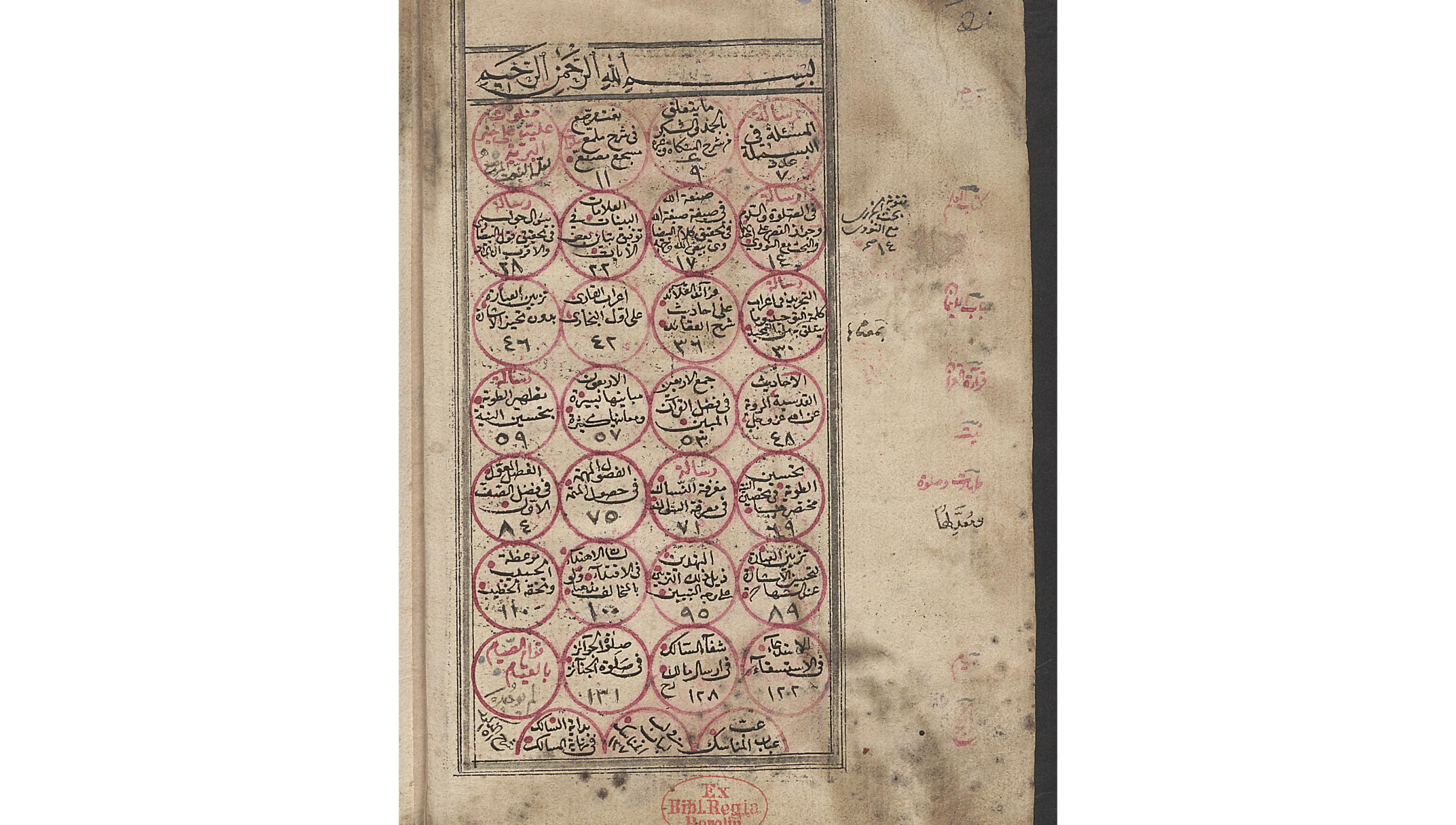
First page of Content of Handschrift Landberg 295 in the Berlin State Library, which has a large collection of al-Qari's work

Nur ad-Din Abu al-Hasan Ali ibn Sultan Muhammad al-Hirawi al-Qari (Arabic: نور الدين أبو الحسن علي بن سلطان محمد الهروي القاري; d. 1605/1606), known as Mulla Ali al-Qari (ملا علي القاري) was a Persian Islamic scholar.

He was born in Herat, where he received his basic Islamic education. Thereafter, he travelled to Mecca and studied under the scholar Shaykh Ahmad Ibn Hajar al-Haytami Makki, and al-Qari eventually decided to remain in Mecca where he taught, died and was buried.

He is considered in Hanafi circles to be one of the masters of hadith and imams of fiqh, Qur'anic commentary, language, history and tasawwuf. He was a hafiz (memoriser of the Quran) and a famous calligrapher who wrote a Quran by hand every year.

Al-Qari wrote several books, including the commentary al-Mirqat on Mishkat al-Masabih in several volumes, a two-volume commentary on Qadi Ayyad's Ash-Shifa, a commentary on the Shama'il al-Tirmidhi, and a two-volume commentary on Al-Ghazali's abridgement of the Ihya Ulum ad-Din (The Revival of the Religious Sciences) entitled `Ayn al-`Ilm wa Zayn al-Hilm (The spring of knowledge and the adornment of understanding). He also wrote Daw' al-Ma'ali Sharh Bad' al-Amali (Arabic: ضوء المعالي شرح بدء الأمالي), an exposition of Qasida Bad' al-Amali by Siraj al-Din al-Ushi.

His most popular work is a collection of prayers (dua), taken from the Quran and the Hadith, called Hizb ul-Azam. The collection is divided into seven chapters, giving one chapter for each day of the week. This work is sometimes found in a collection with the Dalail al-Khayrat.

He died in Makkah and was buried in Jannat al-Mu'alla Cemetery graveyard.

== See also ==
- List of Hanafis
- List of Muslim theologians
- List of Maturidis
- List of Islamic scholars
