= Abd al-Hayy al-Lucknawi =

Indian Islamic Hanafi scholar (1848–1886)

Maulana Abd al-Hayy al-Lakhnawi

Personal life
- Born: 24 October 1848 (26 Dhul Qa'dah, 1264) Banda
- Died: 27 December 1886 (aged 38) (29/30 Rabi al-Awwal 1304) Lucknow
- Resting place: Anwar Bagh, Lucknow

Religious life
- Religion: Islam
- Denomination: Sunni
- Jurisprudence: Hanafi
- Creed: Maturidi

Abdul Hayy Lucknawi Firangi Mahali (24 October 1848 - 27 December 1886) was an Indian Sunni Islamic scholar of Hanafi school of Islamic thought.

== Lineage ==
Abdul Hayy was born in Banda, India. He was an Indo-Arab and a descendant of Abu Ayyub al-Ansari RadiAllahi ‘Anhu from Madinah through the lineage of the Sufi saint of Herat, Abdullah Ansari.

== Early life ==
After his father's death, he studied mathematics under his father's tutor, Muhammad Niamatullah. He taught for a while in Hyderabad. Subsequently, he left for Lucknow where he remained for the rest of his life.

== Status as a Muhaddith ==
The Grand Mufti of Makkah Ahmad Zayni Dahlan granted him permission for all isnad (chains of narration) from al-Hidayah of Burhan al-Din al-Marghinani, Muhammad ibn Abdullah Hanbali of Makkah and Muhammad ibn Muhammad al-Gharbi. Abdul Ghani Dehlwi also granted him permission for various isnad.

== Literary works ==
- Gheebat Kya Hai?
- Al-Ajwibah al-Fadilah lil As'ilat (Arabic)
- Al-Raf' wal Takmil fil Jarh wal Ta'dil (Arabic)
- Al Kalam Al Mateen fi Tahrir Al Baraheen (arabic)- "The solid argument in presenting proofs" - a collection of 52 proofs refuting infinite regress (tasalsul)
- Iqamatul Hujjah 'Ala Annal Ikthar fil Ta'abud (Arabic)
- at-Ta'liq al-Mumajjad (Arabic)
- Sharh al-Wiqaya Ma'a Hashiyat 'Umdatul Ri'ayah (Arabic)
- Tuhfatu al-Akhyar bi Ahya Sunnat Sayyid al-Abrar (Arabic)
- Sibahatil Fikr Fil Jahr Bil Zikr (Arabic)
- Rijal: Narrators of the Muwatta al-Imam Muhammad
- Dhikr: In the Vocal Form, Permissibility and Virtues of Dhikr

== Death ==
He died at the age of 38 and was buried in the graveyard of his ancestors.
