= Burhan al-Din al-Marghinani =

Uzbek Islamic scholar of the Hanafi school (1135–1197)

Burhan al-Din Ali al-Marghinani
- Title: Shaykh al-Islām

Personal life
- Died: 14 Dhu'l-Hijjah 593 AH (29 October 1197)
- Era: Islamic Golden Age
- Region: Transoxania
- Main interest(s): Fiqh, Islamic History
- Notable work: Al-Hidaya

Religious life
- Religion: Islam
- Denomination: Sunni
- Jurisprudence: Hanafi
- Creed: Maturidi

Muslim leader
- Influenced by: Abu Hanifa Abu Hafs Umar al-Nasafi Al-Sarakhsi
- Influenced: Ibn Abidin

Arabic name
- Personal (Ism): ‘Alī
- Patronymic (Nasab): Ibn Abī Bakr ibn ‘Abd al-Jalīl
- Teknonymic (Kunya): Abu’l-Ḥasan
- Epithet (Laqab): Burhān al-Dīn برهان الدين
- Toponymic (Nisba): al-Farghānī, al-Marghīnānī المرغيناني

Burhān al-Dīn Abu’l-Ḥasan ‘Alī bin Abī Bakr bin ‘Abd al-Jalīl al-Farghānī al-Marghīnānī (Arabic: برهان الدين المرغيناني) (1135-1197) was an Islamic scholar of the Hanafi school of jurisprudence. He was born to an Arab family whose lineage goes back to Caliph Abu Bakr al-Siddiq. He was born in Marghinan near Farghana (in present day Uzbekistan). He died in 1197 (593 AH). He is best known as the author of al-Hidayah, which is considered to be one of the most influential compendia of Hanafi jurisprudence (fiqh). Sheikh Muhammad Abd al-Hayy al-Laknawi stated in the book al-Fawa’id al-Bahiyyah: And know that they divided our Hanafi companions into six classes, and the fourth: the class of those with preferential judgment, such as Burhan al-Din al-Marginani, who are able to prefer some narrations over others. Some with good knowledge.

== Life ==
Al-Marghanini performed the Hajj and visited Medina in the year 544 AH. He was thought to have died on the 14th of Dhu'l-Hijjah in the year 593 AH although one report indicated his year of death as 596 AH. He was buried in Samarqand.

== Works ==
Al-Marghinani works (some extant and others known only from literary references) include:

- Nashr al-madhhab
- Kitab manasik al-hajj
- Kitab fi-l-fara'id (also known as Fara'id al-‘Uthmani)
- Kitab al-tajnis wa-l-mazid (collection of fatwas)
- Mukhtarat al-nawazil (collection of fatwas, also known as Mukhtarat majmu` al-nawazil and Mukhtar al-fatawa)
- Mazid fi furu‘ al-hanafiyya
- A commentary on al-Shaybani's al-Jami‘ al-kabir
- Kitab bidayat al-mubtadi (his principle work, based on al-Quduri's Mukhtasar and al-Shaybani's al-Jami‘ al-saghir)
- Kifayat al-muntaha (unfinished 8-volume commentary on his own Kitab bidayat al-mubtadi )
- Al-Hidayah ("The Guidance"), a work on Hanafi law and an abridgement of his commentary on Muhammad al-Shaybani's al-Jami‘ al-Saghir.

== Teachers ==
Al-Marghinani's most important teachers were:

- Najm al-din Abu Hafs Umar an-Nasafi, author of al-‘Aqa’id al-Nasafiyyah fi al-Tauhid;
- Sadr al-Shahid Husam al-Din Umar bin Abd al-Aziz, the commentator of Adab al-Qadi, the most popular book of Imam Khassaf which contains the Islamic Legal and Judicial System.

== See also ==
- Al-Zarnuji
- Al-Kamal ibn al-Humam
- List of Hanafis
- List of Islamic scholars
