= Rumi (given name) =

- Gender: Female

Origin
- Origin: Japanese
- Meaning: It can have many different meanings depending on the kanji used.

Other names
- Related names: Rumiko

Rumi (るみ, ルミ) is a feminine Japanese given name.

== Written forms ==
Rumi can be written using different kanji characters and can mean:

- 留美, "remain, beauty"
- 瑠美, "lapis lazuli, beauty"
- 流美, "current/flow, beauty"
- 流水, "current/flow, water"

The name can also be written in hiragana or katakana.

== Given name ==
- Rumi Hanai (花井 瑠美; born 1987), Japanese actress, model and former rhythmic gymnast
- Rumi Hiiragi (柊 瑠美; born 1987), Japanese actress
- Rumi Kasahara (笠原 留美; born 1970), Japanese voice actress
- Rumi Kazama (風間 ルミ; 1965–2021), Japanese professional wrestler and promoter
- Rumi Matsui (松井 るみ; born 1961), Japanese set designer and scenographer
- Rumi Nakamura, Japanese Earth scientist
- Rumi Ochiai (落合 るみ; born 1973), Japanese actress and voice actress
- Rumi Ōkubo (大久保 瑠美; born 1989), Japanese voice actress
- Rumi Shishido (宍戸 留美; born 1973), Japanese singer and voice actress
- Rumi Suizu (水津 瑠美; born 1990), Japanese former competitive figure skater
- Rumi Tama (珠 瑠美; born 1949), Japanese film director, actress, and screenwriter
- Rumi Utsugi (宇津木 瑠美; born 1988), Japanese women's footballer

== Fictional characters ==
- Rumi (ルミ), a character in the 1997 anime film Perfect Blue
- Rumi (루미), a character in the 2025 animated film KPop Demon Hunters
- Rumi Akeshiro (朱城 ルミ), a character from the role-playing video game Blue Archive
- Rumi Katagiri (片桐るみ), a character in the 2023 anime series Power of Hope: PreCure Full Bloom
- Rumi Komaki (小牧 瑠美), a character in the Kamen Rider Fourze
- Rumi Matsuura, a character in the manga and anime series Marmalade Boy
- Rumi Nanase, a character in the Tactics's One: Kagayaku Kisetsu e video game
- Rumi Usagiyama, a character from the manga and anime, My Hero Academia
- Rumi Wakasa, a character in the manga and anime series Detective Conan

== See also ==
- Rumi (disambiguation)
