= Cluster II (spacecraft) =

European Space Agency space mission

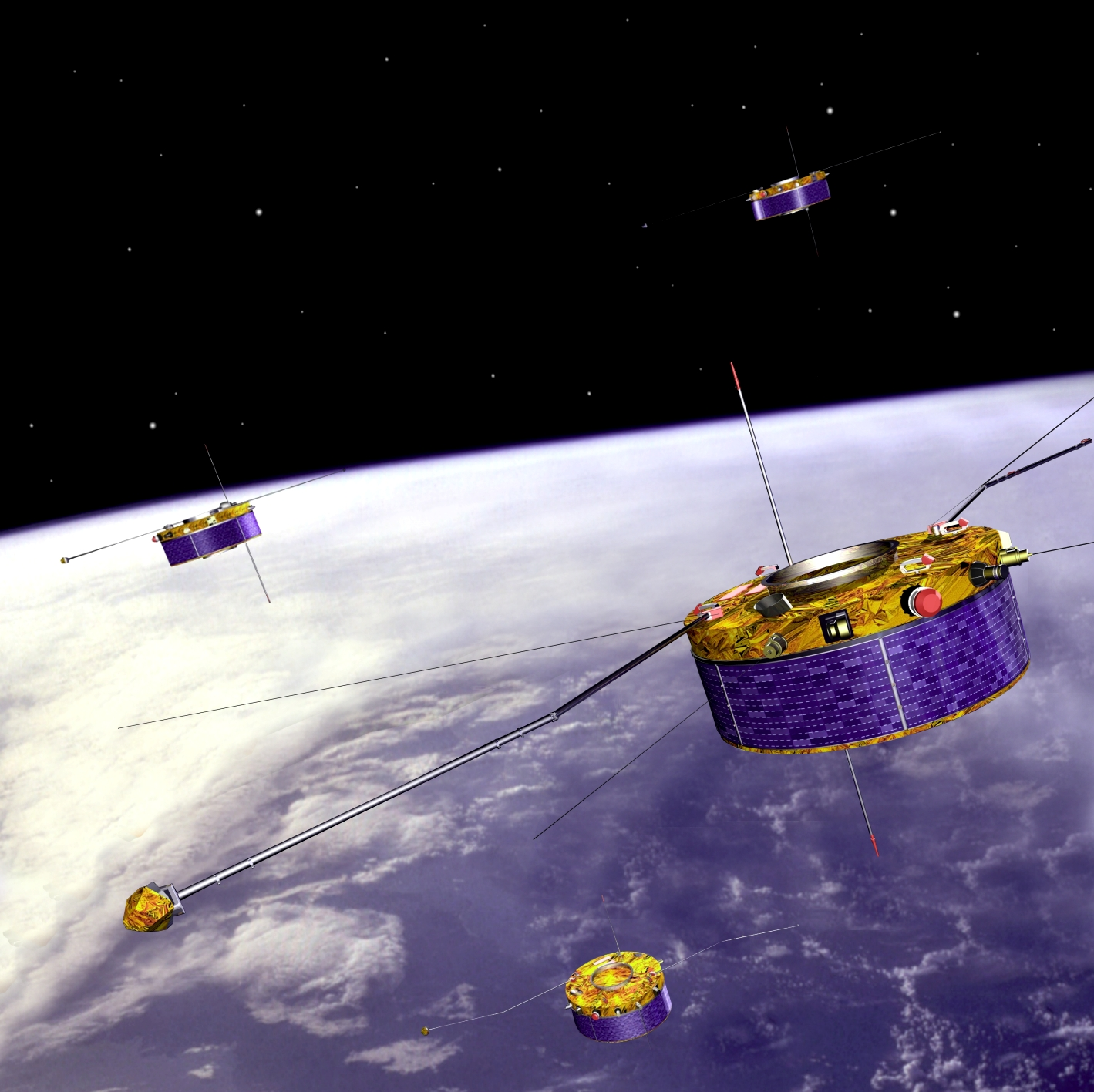
- Artist's impression of the Cluster constellation.
- Mission type: Magnetospheric research
- Operator: ESA with NASA collaboration
- COSPAR ID: FM6 (SALSA): 2000-041B; FM7 (SAMBA): 2000-041A; FM5 (RUMBA): 2000-045A; FM8 (TANGO): 2000-045B
- SATCAT no.: FM6 (SALSA): 26411; FM7 (SAMBA): 26410; FM5 (RUMBA): 26463; FM8 (TANGO): 26464
- Website: http://cosmos.esa.int/web/csa
- Mission duration: Planned: 5 years Final: 24 years, 1 month and 6 days

Spacecraft properties
- Manufacturer: Airbus (ex. Dornier)
- Launch mass: 1,200 kg (2,600 lb)
- Dry mass: 550 kg (1,210 lb)
- Payload mass: 71 kg (157 lb)
- Dimensions: 2.9 m × 1.3 m (9.5 ft × 4.3 ft)
- Power: 224 watts

Start of mission
- Launch date: FM6: 16 July 2000, 12:39 UTC; FM7: 16 July 2000, 12:39 UTC; FM5: 09 August 2000, 11:13 UTC; FM8: 09 August 2000, 11:13 UTC
- Rocket: Soyuz-U/Fregat
- Launch site: Baikonur 31/6
- Contractor: Starsem

End of mission
- Last contact: 01 September 2026
- Decay date: SALSA: 08 September 2024; RUMBA: 22 October 2025; SAMBA: 31 August 2026; TANGO: 01 September 2026

Orbital parameters
- Reference system: Geocentric
- Regime: Elliptical Orbit
- Perigee altitude: FM6: 16,118 km (10,015 mi); FM7: 16,157 km (10,039 mi); FM5: 16,022 km (9,956 mi); FM8: 12,902 km (8,017 mi)
- Apogee altitude: FM6: 116,740 km (72,540 mi); FM7: 116,654 km (72,485 mi); FM5: 116,786 km (72,567 mi); FM8: 119,952 km (74,535 mi)
- Inclination: FM6: 135 degrees FM7: 135 degrees FM5: 138 degrees FM8: 134 degrees
- Period: FM6: 3259 minutes FM7: 3257 minutes FM5: 3257 minutes FM8: 3258 minutes
- Epoch: 13 March 2014, 11:15:07 UTC
- Contemporary ESA insignia (2000s) Horizon 2000 (Science Programme)

Cluster II was a space mission of the European Space Agency, with NASA participation, to study the Earth's magnetosphere over the course of nearly two solar cycles. The mission was composed of four identical spacecraft flying in a tetrahedral formation. As a replacement for the original Cluster spacecraft which were lost in a launch failure in 1996, the four Cluster II spacecraft were successfully launched in pairs in July and August 2000 onboard two Soyuz-Fregat rockets from Baikonur, Kazakhstan. In February 2011, Cluster II celebrated 10 years of successful scientific operations in space. In February 2021, Cluster II celebrated 20 years of successful scientific operations in space. As of March 2023, its mission was extended until the end of September 2024. The China National Space Administration/ESA Double Star mission operated alongside Cluster II from 2004 to 2007.

The first of the four Cluster II satellites to re-enter the atmosphere over the Pacific ocean did so on 8 September 2024 and the second one on 22 October 2025. Third one followed 31 August 2026. The remaining one disintegrated on 01 September 2026. The scientific payload operations of all satellites ended as the first satellite re-entered the atmosphere (other flight operations were still being performed with the remaining flying satellites until the satellites all re-entered).

== Mission overview ==
The four identical Cluster II satellites studied the impact of the Sun's activity on the Earth's space environment by flying in formation around Earth. For the first time in space history, this mission was able to collect three-dimensional information on how the solar wind interacts with the magnetosphere and affects near-Earth space and its atmosphere, including aurorae.

The spacecraft were cylindrical (2.9 x 1.3 m, see online 3D model) and were spinning at 15 rotations per minute. After launch, their solar cells provided 224 watts power for instruments and communications. Solar array power gradually declined as the mission progressed, due to damage by energetic charged particles, but this was planned for and the power level remains sufficient for science operations. The four spacecraft maneuvered into various tetrahedral formations to study the magnetospheric structure and boundaries. The inter-spacecraft distances could be altered and varied from around 4 to 10,000 km. The propellant for the transfer to the operational orbit, and the maneuvers to vary inter-spacecraft separation distances made up approximately half of the spacecraft's launch weight.

The highly elliptical orbits of the spacecraft initially reached a perigee of around 4 R_{E} (Earth radii, where 1 R_{E} = 6371 km) and an apogee of 19.6 R_{E}. Each orbit took approximately 57 hours to complete. The orbit evolved over time; the line of apsides rotated southwards so that the distance at which the orbit crossed the magnetotail current sheet progressively reduced, and a wide range of dayside magnetopause crossing latitudes were sampled. Gravitational effects imposed a long term cycle of change in the perigee (and apogee) distance, which saw the perigees reduce to a few 100 km in 2011 before beginning to rise again. The orbit plane rotated away from 90 degrees inclination. Orbit modifications by ESOC altered the orbital period to 54 hours. All these changes allowed Cluster to visit a much wider set of important magnetospheric regions than was possible for the initial 2-year mission, improving the scientific breadth of the mission.

The European Space Operations Centre (ESOC) acquired telemetry and distributed to the online data centers the science data from the spacecraft. The Joint Science Operations Centre (JSOC) at Rutherford Appleton Laboratory in the UK coordinated scientific planning and in collaboration with the instrument teams provided merged instrument commanding requests to ESOC.

The Cluster Science Archive is the ESA long term archive of the Cluster and Double Star science missions. Since 1 November 2014, it is the sole public access point to the Cluster mission scientific data and supporting datasets. The Double Star data are publicly available via this archive. The Cluster Science Archive is located alongside all the other ESA science archives at the European Space Astronomy Center, located near Madrid, Spain.

== History ==
The Cluster mission was proposed to ESA in 1982 and approved in 1986, along with the Solar and Heliospheric Observatory (SOHO), and together these two missions constituted the Solar Terrestrial Physics "cornerstone" of ESA's Horizon 2000 missions programme. Though the original Cluster spacecraft were completed in 1995, the explosion of the Ariane 5 rocket carrying the satellites in 1996 delayed the mission by four years while new instruments and spacecraft were built.

On July 16, 2000, a Soyuz-Fregat rocket from the Baikonur Cosmodrome launched two of the replacement Cluster II spacecraft, (Salsa and Samba) into a parking orbit from where they maneuvered under their own power into a 19,000 by 119,000 kilometre orbit with a period of 57 hours. Three weeks later on August 9, 2000, another Soyuz-Fregat rocket lifted the remaining two spacecraft (Rumba and Tango) into similar orbits. Spacecraft 1, Rumba, was also known as the Phoenix spacecraft, since it is largely built from spare parts left over after the failure of the original mission. After commissioning of the payload, the first scientific measurements were made on February 1, 2001.

The European Space Agency ran a competition to name the satellites across all of the ESA member states. Ray Cotton, from the United Kingdom, won the competition with the names Rumba, Tango, Salsa and Samba. Ray's town of residence, Bristol, was awarded with scale models of the satellites in recognition of the winning entry, as well as the city's connection with the satellites. However, after many years of being stored away, they were finally given a home at the Rutherford Appleton Laboratory.

Originally planned to last until the end of 2003, the mission was extended several times. The first extension took the mission from 2004 until 2005, and the second from 2005 to June 2009. The mission was ultimately extended until September 2024, when the scientific payload operations on the satellites ended. The ultimate end of the Cluster project (especially the Cluster II satellites) happened on 01 September 2026 when the last satellite disintegrated in the atmosphere. In late January 2026, ESA commanded the remaining two Cluster II satellites, SAMBA and TANGO, to adjust their orbits so their reentry on 31 August and 1 September 2026 can be observed by an airplane.

== Scientific objectives ==
Previous single and two-spacecraft missions were not capable of providing the data required to accurately study the boundaries of the magnetosphere. Because the plasma comprising the magnetosphere cannot be viewed using remote sensing techniques, satellites must be used to measure it in-situ. Four spacecraft allowed scientists make the 3D, time-resolved measurements needed to create a realistic picture of the complex plasma interactions occurring between regions of the magnetosphere and between the magnetosphere and the solar wind.

Each satellite carried a scientific payload of 11 instruments designed to study the small-scale plasma structures in space and time in the key plasma regions: solar wind, bow shock, magnetopause, polar cusps, magnetotail, plasmapause boundary layer and over the polar caps and the auroral zones.

- The bow shock is the region in space between the Earth and the Sun where the solar wind decelerates from super- to sub-sonic before being deflected around the Earth. In traversing this region, the spacecraft made measurements which helped characterize processes occurring at the bow shock, such as the origin of hot flow anomalies and the transmission of electromagnetic waves through the bow shock and the magnetosheath from the solar wind.
- Behind the bow shock is the thin plasma layer separating the Earth and solar wind magnetic fields known as the magnetopause. This boundary moves continuously due to the constant variation in solar wind pressure. Since the plasma and magnetic pressures within the solar wind and the magnetosphere, respectively, should be in equilibrium, the magnetosphere should be an impenetrable boundary. However, plasma has been observed crossing the magnetopause into the magnetosphere from the solar wind. Cluster's four-point measurements made it possible to track the motion of the magnetopause as well as elucidate the mechanism for plasma penetration from the solar wind.
- In two regions, one in the northern hemisphere and the other in the southern, the magnetic field of the Earth is perpendicular rather than tangential to the magnetopause. These polar cusps allow solar wind particles, consisting of ions and electrons, to flow into the magnetosphere. Cluster recorded the particle distributions, which allowed the turbulent regions at the exterior cusps to be characterized.
- The regions of the Earth's magnetic field that are stretched by the solar wind away from the Sun are known collectively as the magnetotail. Two lobes that reach past the Moon in length form the outer magnetotail while the central plasma sheet forms the inner magnetotail, which is highly active. Cluster monitored particles from the ionosphere and the solar wind as they passed through the magnetotail lobes. In the central plasma sheet, Cluster determined the origins of ion beams and disruptions to the magnetic field-aligned currents caused by substorms.
- The precipitation of charged particles in the atmosphere creates a ring of light emission around the magnetic pole known as the auroral zone. Cluster measured the time variations of transient particle flows and electric and magnetic fields in the region.

== Instrumentation on each Cluster satellite ==
Number	Acronym	Instrument	Measurement	Purpose
1	ASPOC	Active Spacecraft Potential Control experiment	Regulation of spacecraft's electrostatic potential	Enabled the measurement by PEACE of cold electrons (a few eV temperature), otherwise hidden by spacecraft photoelectrons
2	CIS	Cluster Ion Spectroscopy experiment	Ion times-of-flight (TOFs) and energies from 0 to 40 keV	Composition and 3D distribution of ions in plasma
3	DWP	Digital Wave Processing instrument	Coordinates the operations of the EFW, STAFF, WBD and WHISPER instruments	At the lowest level, DWP provided electrical signals to synchronise instrument sampling. At the highest level, DWP enabled more complex operational modes by means of macros
4	EDI	Electron Drift Instrument	Electric field E magnitude and direction	E vector, gradients in local magnetic field B
5	EFW	Electric Field and Wave experiment	Electric field E magnitude and direction	E vector, spacecraft potential, electron density and temperature
6	FGM	Fluxgate Magnetometer	Magnetic field B magnitude and direction	B vector and event trigger to all instruments except ASPOC
7	PEACE	Plasma Electron and Current Experiment	Electron energies from 0.0007 to 30 keV	3D distribution of electrons in plasma
8	RAPID	Research with Adaptive Particle Imaging Detectors	Electron energies from 39 to 406 keV, ion energies from 20 to 450 keV	3D distributions of high-energy electrons and ions in plasma
9	STAFF	Spatio-Temporal Analysis of Field Fluctuation experiment	Magnetic field B magnitude and direction of EM fluctuations, cross-correlation of E and B	Properties of small-scale current structures, source of plasma waves and turbulence
10	WBD	Wide Band Data receiver	High time resolution measurements of both electric and magnetic fields in selected frequency bands from 25 Hz to 577 kHz. It provided a unique new capability to perform Very-long-baseline interferometry (VLBI) measurements	Properties of natural plasma waves (e.g. auroral kilometric radiation) in the Earth magnetosphere and its vicinity including: source location and size and propagation
11	WHISPER	Waves of High Frequency and Sounder for Probing of Density by Relaxation	Electric field E spectrograms of terrestrial plasma waves and radio emissions in the 2–80 kHz range; triggering of plasma resonances by an active sounder	Source location of waves by triangulation; electron density within the range 0.2–80 cm^{−3}

== Double Star mission with China ==
In 2003 and 2004, the China National Space Administration launched the Double Star satellites, TC-1 and TC-2, that worked together with Cluster to make coordinated measurements mostly within the magnetosphere. TC-1 stopped operating on 14 October 2007. The last data from TC-2 was received in 2008. TC-2 made a contribution to magnetar science as well as to magnetospheric physics. The TC-1 examined density holes near the Earth's bow shock that can play a role in bow shock formation and looked at neutral sheet oscillations.

== Awards ==
Cluster team awards

- 2024 British Interplanetary Society Sir Arthur Clarke Award to the UK Cluster Mission Team
- 2019 Royal Astronomical Society Group Achievement Award
- 2015 ESA 15th anniversary award
- 2013 ESA team award
- 2010 International Academy of Astronautics Laurels for team achievements for Cluster and Double Star teams
- 2005 ESA Cluster 5th anniversary award
- 2004 NASA group achievement award
- 2000 Popular science best of what's new award
- 2000 ESA Cluster launch award

Individual awards

- 2023 Hermann Opgenoorth (Univ. of Umea, Sweden), former Cluster Ground Based Working Group lead, was awarded the 2023 EGU Julius Bartels Medal
- 2020 Daniel Graham (Swedish Institute of Space Physics, Uppsala, Sweden) was awarded the COSPAR Zeldovich medal
- 2019 Margaret Kivelson (UCLA, USA), Cluster FGM CoI, received RAS gold medal
- 2018 Hermann Opgenoorth (Univ. of Umea, Sweden), former Cluster Ground Based Working Group lead, was awarded the 2018 Baron Marcel Nicolet Space Weather and Space Climate medal
- 2016 Stephen Fuselier (SWRI, USA), Cluster CIS CoI, received EGU Hannes Alfvén Meda
- 2016 Mike Hapgood, Cluster mission scientific operations expert was awarded the Baron Marcel Nicolet Medal for Space Weather and Space Climate
- 2014 Rumi Nakamura (IWF, Austria), Cluster CIS/EDI/FGM CoI, received EGU Julius Bartels Medal
- 2013 Mike Hapgood (RAL, UK), Cluster JSOC project scientist received RAS service award
- 2013 Göran Marklund, EFW Co-I, received the EGU Hannes Alfvén Medal 2013.
- 2013 Steve Milan, Cluster Ground based representative of the Cluster mission received UK Royal Astronomical Society (RAS) Chapman medal
- 2012 Andrew Fazakerley, Cluster and Double Star PI (PEACE), received the Royal Astronomical Society Chapman Medal
- 2012 Zuyin Pu (Pekin U., China), RAPID/CIS/FGM CoI, received AGU International Award
- 2012 Jolene Pickett (Iowa U., USA), a Cluster WBD PI, received the State of Iowa Board of Regents Staff Excellence
- 2012 Jonathan Eastwood (Imperial College, UK), FGM Co-I, received COSPAR Yakov B. Zeldovich medal
- 2008 Andre Balogh (Imperial College, UK), Cluster FGM PI, received RAS Chapman medal
- 2006 Steve Schwartz (QMW, UK), Cluster UK data system scientist and PEACE co-I, received RAS Chapman medal

== Discoveries and mission milestones ==
=== 2026 ===
- September 01 – Re-entry of Cluster 4 in the pacific ocean
- August 31 – Re-entry of Cluster 3 in the pacific ocean
- July 15 – Cluster, Double Star, THEMIS and the Magnetospheric Multiscale Mission reveal the impact of extreme geomagnetic storms can be twice as large as previously thought
- April 1 – Saturn's cusp compared to cusp topology at Earth
- February 12 – Cluster, Swarm, ground stations and other missions team up to better understand the coupling between ionospheric current systems and ground currents
- January 6 – Proof of how the most violent particle acceleration are created in the universe. This proof was enabled by machine learning techniques applied to 20 years of measurements in the Earth’s magnetosphere by 4 space missions including Cluster and Double Star, THEMIS and the Magnetospheric Multiscale Mission. The physical phenomenon is called magnetic reconnection

=== 2025 ===
- November 1 – Cluster and THEMIS observe simultaneously Kelvin–Helmholtz instability on both flanks of the magnetopause
- October 30 – Online release of the Seas of the Sun: The story of Cluster (documentary) on YouTube
- October 22 – Re-entry of RUMBA (Cluster 1) over the Pacific Ocean at 20:59 CEST
- April 3 – Cluster observes plasma in the high-latitude magnetotail associated With cusp-aligned arcs
- March 19 – Earth ring current observed in-situ by Cluster, THEMIS and MMS compared
- February 22 – A new dataset to localize the Cluster satellites in the geospace environment
- January 21 – Ion flow vortex may serve as novel electron accelerator in space

=== 2024 ===
- December 1 – 14 years of Cluster data to predict proton intensities around Earth
- November 13 – Polar cap auroral arcs linked to lobe reconnection
- September 8 – Re-entry of SALSA (Cluster 2) satellite, the first of the Cluster II satellites to re-enter the atmosphere
- September 4 – Strong effects of chorus waves on radiation belts expected for future magnetic superstorms
- August 30 – The pioneer Cluster mission: preparation of its legacy phase near re-entry
- July 6 – Cluster data contributes to collisionless shocks database acquired at Earth, Venus and Mars
- May 24 – Cluster releases list of plasma jets found in the magnetosheath
- April 5 – Unveiling the journey of a highly inclined CME
- January 20 – Global-scale magnetosphere convection driven by dayside magnetic reconnection

=== 2023 ===
- April 28 – Magnetic reconnection at high and low latitudes during the passage of an ICME
- March 24 – Properties of the Martian Magnetotail compared Cluster data in the Earth magnetotail
- March 23 – Scaling laws for the energy transfer in space plasma turbulence
- March 1 – Turbulent MHD cascade in the Jovian magnetosheath compared to Cluster measurements
- January 26 – Evidence for lunar tide effects in Earth's plasmasphere
- January 20 – Ion Outflow in Middle Altitude LLBL/Cusp from Different Origins

=== 2022 ===
- December 5 - Magnetosphere distortions during the "satellite killer" storm of February 3–4, 2022
- October 14 - New insights on the formation of transpolar auroral arc
- September 20 - A highway for atmospheric ion escape from Earth during the impact of an interplanetary coronal mass ejection
- August 3 - Joint Cluster/ground-based studies in the first 20 years of the Cluster mission
- July 18 – In situ observation of a magnetopause indentation that is correspondent to throat aurora and is caused by magnetopause reconnection
- June 16 - Kelvin-Helmholtz vortices as an interplay of Magnetosphere-Ionosphere coupling
- June 2 - ESA highlight: Magnetic vortices explain mysterious auroral beads
- May 16 - The influence of localized dynamics on dusk-dawn convection in the Earth's magnetotail
- April 1 - Dawn-dusk ion flow asymmetry in the plasma sheet
- February 1 - South Pole Station ground-based and Cluster satellite measurements of leaked and escaping Auroral Kilometric Radiation
- January 1 - Massive multi-mission statistical study and analytical modeling of the Earth's magnetopause

=== 2021 ===
- December 15 - ESA highlight: Swarm and Cluster get to the bottom of geomagnetic storms
- November 7 - Unique MMS and Cluster observations about magnetic reconnection extent at the magnetopause
- November 2 - Spatial distribution of energetic protons in the magnetosphere based on 17 years of data
- October 11 - Unique MMS and Cluster observation of disturbances in the near-Earth magnetotail before a magnetic substorm
- September 7 - AGU EOS spotlight: Understanding Aurora Formation with ESA's Cluster Mission
- May 2 - Cluster and MMS uncover anisotropic spatial correlation functions at kinetic range in the magnetosheath turbulence
- April 9 - The Solar-cycle Variations of the Anisotropy of Taylor Scale and Correlation Scale in the Solar Wind Turbulence
- February 18 - Heavy Metal and Rock in Space: Cluster RAPID Observations of Fe and Si

=== 2020 ===
- December 1 - Cluster, Helios and Ulysses reveal characteristics of solar wind supra thermal halo electrons
- November 1 - Cluster, Swam and CHAMP join forces to explain hemispheric asymmetries in the Earth magnetotail
- October 21 - Space plasma regimes classified with Cluster data
- October 1 - Effects of Solar Activity on Taylor Scale and Correlation Scale in Solar Wind Magnetic Fluctuations
- September 1 - Van Allen Probes and Cluster join forces to study Outer Radiation Belt Electrons
- August 9 - Cluster's 20 years of studying Earth's magnetosphere], celebrating 20 years after the launch of the second pair of Cluster spacecraft
- July 31 - ESA science highlight: Auroral substorms triggered by short circuiting of plasma flows
- July 16 - BBC skyatnight podcast with Dr. Mike Hapgood on 20 years of ESA's Cluster mission, celebrating 20 years after the launch of the first pair of Cluster satellites
- April 20 - What drives some of the largest and most dynamic auroral forms?
- March 19 - ESA science highlight: Iron is everywhere in Earth's vicinity, suggest two decades of Cluster data
- February 27 - What makes Kelvin Helmholtz vortices grow at the Earth's magnetopause?

=== 2019 ===
- December 23 - Magnetized dust clouds penetrate the terrestrial bow shock
- November 18 - Earth's magnetic song recorded for the first time during a solar storm
- October 10 - What is the source of the energetic oxygen ions found in the high-altitude cusp region?
- August 27 - Cluster and XMM pave the way for SMILE
- August 20 - Asymmetric transport of the Earth's polar outflows by the interplanetary magnetic field
- August 5 - Energetic electron acceleration found by Cluster in unconfined reconnection jets for the first time
- May 1 - Kelvin‐Helmholtz waves magnetic curvature and vorticity: Four‐spacecraft Cluster observations
- March 4 - ESA science highlight: Cluster helps solve mysteries of geomagnetic storms
- February 27 - ESA science highlight: Cluster reveals inner workings of Earth's cosmic particle accelerator
- February 13 - Statistical survey of the terrestrial bow shock observed by the Cluster spacecraft
- January 14 - Super-efficient electron acceleration by an isolated magnetic reconnection

=== 2018 ===
- November 28 – Complete picture of the O+ circulation (and escape) in the outer magnetosphere and its dependence on geomagnetic activity
- November 8 - ESA science highlight: Windy with a chance of magnetic storms – space weather science with Cluster
- September 30 - O+ escape during the extreme space weather event of 4–10 September 2017
- August 8 - Statistical survey of day-side magnetospheric current flow using Cluster observations: bow shock
- June 20 – Detection of magnetic nulls around reconnection fronts (open access)
- May 21 – Tailward propagation of magnetic energy density variations with respect to substorm onset times (open access)
- April 24 – Kelvin–Helmholtz Instability: lessons learned and ways forward
- March 29 – Three-dimensional density and compressible magnetic structure in solar wind turbulence
- February 8 – ESA spotlight on... Understanding Earth: what the Cluster mission has taught us so far
- January 29 – ESA research highlight: Cluster measures turbulence in Earth's magnetic environment
- January 22 – Science nugget of the 2013-2014 Cluster Inner Magnetosphere campaign

=== 2017 ===
- December 11, 2017 – Empirical modeling of the quiet and storm time geosynchronous magnetic field
- December 6, 2017 – Direct measurement of anisotropic and asymmetric wave vector spectrum in ion-scale solar wind turbulence
- October 30, 2017 – Coherent structures at ion scales in the fast solar wind: Cluster observations
- September 18, 2017 – An intense magnetic substorm scrutinized by a fleet of satellites including Cluster and MMS (open access)
- August 28, 2017 – Relationship between electron field‐aligned anisotropy and dawn‐dusk magnetic field: nine years of Cluster observations in the Earth magnetotail
- August 1, 2017 – Collisionless shock velocity estimation at Venus and Earth (open access)
- June 16, 2017 – Cover of GRL: Global ULF waves generated by a hot flow anomaly
- April 10, 2017 - ESA research highlight: O marks the spot for magnetic reconnection
- April 7, 2017 – EOS research spotlight: Explaining unexpected twists in the Sun's Magnetic Field
- March 23, 2017 – Occurrence frequency and location of magnetic islands at the dayside magnetopause
- February 18, 2017 – Magnetic reconnection and their associated auroral enhancements (open access)

=== 2016 ===
- October 3, 2016 – What happens to the Earth's magnetosphere when its bow shock disappears?
- September 6, 2016 – Embry-Riddle University (FL, USA) science highlight: Space plasma hurricanes could lead to new sources of energy
- July 20, 2016 – Cluster and MMS join forces to understand the origin of northern lights
- July 8 – Transport of solar wind H+ and He++ ions across Earth's bow shock
- July 7 – ESA science highlight: the curious case of Earth's leaking atmosphere
- June 11 – Substructures within a dipolarization front revealed by high-temporal resolution Cluster observations
- May 11 – Cone angle control of the interaction of magnetic clouds with the Earth's bow shock
- March 21 – The particle carriers of field‐aligned currents in the Earth's magnetotail during a substorm
- February 29 – The role of ionospheric O+ outflow in the generation of earthward propagating plasmoids
- January 11 – A statistical study of plasmaspheric plumes and ionospheric outflows observed at the dayside magnetopause

=== 2015 ===
- December 7 - Coalescence of magnetic flux ropes in the ion diffusion region of magnetic reconnection
- October 22 - Wide-banded Non-Thermal Continuum (NTC) radiation: local to remote observations by the four Cluster satellites
- September 3 - Statistics and accuracy of magnetic null identification in multispacecraft data (open access)
- August 22 - Cusp dynamics under northward IMF using three‐dimensional global particle‐in‐cell simulations (open access)
- July 14 - Cluster solves the mystery of equatorial noise
- July 1 - Seven ESA satellites team up to explore the Earth's magnetic field
- April 9 - Heart of the black auroras revealed by Cluster
- March 25 - Cluster satellite catches up
- February 19 - Magnetospheric signatures of ionospheric density cavities observed by Cluster (open access)
- February 16 - Solar illumination control of ionospheric outflow above polar cap arcs (open access)
- January 16 – Rejigging the Cluster quartet at the bow shock and in the solar wind

=== 2014 ===
- December 18 – Origin of high-latitude auroras revealed
- November 20 - The Cluster mission is extended by ESA up to 2018
- September 4 - Full particle electromagnetic simulations of entropy generation across a collisionless shock
- August 28 – A mixed-up magnetic storm
- July 1 - Dawn–dusk asymmetries in the coupled solar wind–magnetosphere–ionosphere system: a review
- June 15 - Solar wind breaks through the Earth's magnetic field
- May 28 - Evidence of strong energetic ion acceleration in the near‐Earth magnetotail (free access)
- May 7 - Cluster helps to model Earth's mysterious magnetosphere
- March 15 - Direct calculation of the ring current distribution and magnetic structure seen by Cluster during geomagnetic storms (open access)
- January 13 - Low-altitude electron acceleration due to multiple flow bursts in the magnetotail (open access)

=== 2013 ===
- November 26 - Cluster takes a tilt at radio wave sources
- November 15 – On the relation between asymmetries in the ring current and magnetopause current (free access)
- September 20 - ESA's Cluster satellites in closest-ever 'dance in space'
- September 10 – Cluster shows plasmasphere interacting with Van Allen belts
- July 18 - Wobbly magnetic reconnection speeds up electrons
- July 2 - Cluster discovers steady leak in the Earth's plasmasphere
- May 2 - Cluster hears the heartbeat of magnetic reconnection
- April 15 - From solar activity to stunning aurora (ESA Space Science's image of the week)
- April 10 – Cluster finds source of aurora energy boost

=== 2012 ===
- December 18 – The solar wind is swirly
- October 24 - Cluster observes a 'porous' magnetopause
- August 1 – Cluster looks into waves in the magnetosphere's thin boundaries
- July 2 - Hidden Portals in Earth's Magnetic Field (NASA science cast video)
- June 6 – Origin of particle acceleration in cusps of Earth's magnetosphere uncovered
- March 7 - Earth's magnetic field provides vital protection
- February 27 - Northern lights mystery may be solved (Space.com)
- February 23 - Surprise Ions (Science News for kids)
- January 26 - Giant veil of cold plasma discovered high above Earth (National Geographic)
- January 24 – Elusive matter found to be abundant far above Earth (AGU press release)

=== 2011 ===
- November 16 – Cluster reveals Earth's bow shock is remarkably thin
- September 6 – Ultra fast substorm auroras explained
- August 31 - 40 year old Mariner 5 solar wind problem finds answer
- July 5–10 - Aurora explorer: the Cluster mission exhibit at the Royal Society summer science exhibition 2011
- July 4 – Cluster observes jet braking and plasma heating
- June 30 - 'Dirty hack' restores Cluster mission from near loss
- March 21 - How vital is a planet's magnetic field? New debate rises
- February 5 – Cluster encounters a natural particle accelerator
- January 7 - ESA spacecraft model magnetic boundaries

=== 2010 ===
- November 22 - ESA extends the Cluster mission until December 2014
- October 4 – Cluster helps disentangle turbulence in the solar wind
- September 1 - 10 years of success for Cluster quartet
- July 26 - Cluster makes crucial step in understanding space weather
- July 16 - Cluster's decade of discovery
- July 8 - Announcement of opportunity for Cluster guest investigators
- June 3 – The Cluster archive: more than 1000 users
- April 24 - High-speed plasma jets: origin uncovered
- March 11 - Shocking recipe for 'killer electrons'
- January 20 - Multiple rifts in Earth's magnetic shield

=== 2009 ===
- October 7 - ESA extends the Cluster mission until December 2012
- July 16 – Cluster shows how solar wind is heated at electron scales
- June 18 - Cluster and Double Star: 1000 publications
- April 29 - Monitoring the impact of extreme solar events
- March 25 - Cluster's insight into space turbulence
- February 9 - ESA extends the Cluster mission until the end of 2009
- January 14 – Cluster detects invisible escaping ions

=== 2008 ===
- December 15 - The science of space weather
- December 5 - Looking at Jupiter to understand Earth
- October 17 - Highlights from Cluster-THEMIS workshop
- August 27 - Cluster examines Earth-escaping ions
- August 11 - Electron trapping within reconnection
- June 27 - Beamed radio emission from Earth
- June 9 - Reconnection - Triggered by Whistlers?
- March 7 - Solitons found in the magnetopause
- January 23 - Cluster result impacts future space missions

=== 2007 ===
- December 6 - Cluster explains nightside ion beams
- November 21 - Cluster captures the impact of a Coronal Mass Ejection
- November 9 - Cluster probes generalized Ohm's law in space
- October 22 - Cluster monitors convection cells over the polar caps
- September 11 - Cluster and Double Star pinpoint the source of bright aurorae
- July 26 - Cluster helps reveal how the Sun shakes the Earth's magnetic field
- June 29 - Cluster unveils a new 3D vision of magnetic reconnection
- June 21 - Formation flying at closest-ever separation
- May 11 - Cluster reveals the reformation of the Earth's bow shock
- April 12 - Cluster finds new clues on what triggers space tsunamis
- March 26 - First direct evidence in space of magnetic reconnection in turbulent plasma
- March 12 - A leap forward in probing magnetic reconnection in space
- February 9 - New insights in the auroral electrical circuit revealed by Cluster

=== 2006 ===
- December 29 - 1000th Orbit for the Cluster Mission
- December 6 - Cluster finds magnetic reconnection within giant swirls of plasma
- November 13 - Cluster takes a new look at the plasmasphere
- October 5 - Double Star and Cluster witness pulsated reconnection for several hours
- August 24 - Cluster links magnetic substorms and Earthward directed high-speed flows
- July 18 - Magnetic heart of a 3D reconnection event revealed by Cluster
- June 20 - Space is fizzy
- May 19 - New Microscopic Properties of Magnetic Reconnection Derived by Cluster
- March 30 - Cluster and Double Star reveal the extent of neutral sheet oscillations
- February 24 - Cluster reveals fundamental 3-D properties of magnetic turbulence
- February 1 - The Cluster Active Archive goes live
- January 11 - Cover of Nature Magazine: Feel the Force

=== 2005 ===
- December 22 - Cluster helps to protect astronauts and satellites against killer electrons
- September 21 - Double Star and Cluster observe first evidence of crustal cracking
- August 10 - From 'macro' to 'micro' – turbulence seen by Cluster
- July 28 - First direct measurements of the ring current
- July 14 - Five years of formation flying with Cluster
- April 28 - Calming effect of a solar storm
- February 18 - Cluster will become the first multi-scale mission
- February 4 - Direct observation of 3D magnetic reconnection

=== 2004 ===
- December 12 - Cluster determines the spatial scale of high speed flows in the magnetotail
- November 24 Four-point observations of solar wind discontinuities
- September 17 - Cluster locates the source of non-thermal terrestrial continuum radiation by triangulation
- August 12 - Cluster finds giant gas vortices at the edge of Earth's magnetic bubble
- June 23 - Cluster discovers internal origin of the plasma sheet oscillations
- May 13 - Cluster captures a triple cusp
- May 11 - Cluster observes finite amplitude Alfvén waves and small-scale magnetic filaments downstream of a quasi-perpendicular shock
- April 5 - First attempt to estimate Earth's bow shock thickness

=== 2001–2003 ===
- 3 December 2003 - Cracks in Earth's magnetic shield (NASA website)
- 29 June 2003 - Multi-point observations of magnetic reconnection
- 20 May 2003 - ESA's Cluster solves auroral puzzle
- 29 January 2003 - Bifurcation of the tail current
- 28 January 2003 - Electric current measured in space for the first time
- 29 December 2002 - Thickness of the tail current sheet estimated in space for the first time
- 1 October 2002 - Telescopic/Microscopic view of a substorm
- 11 December 2001 - Cluster quartet probes the secrets of the black aurora
- 31 October 2001 - First measurements of density gradients in space
- 9 October 2001 - Double cusp observed by Cluster
- 1 February 2001 – Official start of scientific operations

== See also ==
- Seas of the Sun: The story of Cluster (documentary) on YouTube
- Masson, A.; C.P. Escoubet; M.G.G.T. Taylor; D. Sieg (2024). "The pioneer Cluster mission: preparation of its legacy phase near re-entry". Earth, Planets and Space. 76 (1) 114. Bibcode:2024EP&S...76..114M. doi:10.1186/s40623-024-02060-1.
- Escoubet, C.P.; A. Masson; H. Laakso; M.L. Goldstein (2021). "Cluster after 20 years of operations: Science highlights and technical challenges". Journal of Geophysical Research: Space Physics. 126 (8) e2021JA029474. Bibcode:2021JGRA..12629474E. doi:10.1029/2021JA029474. hdl:11603/25562.
- Escoubet, C.P.; A. Masson; H. Laakso; M.L. Goldstein (2015). "Recent highlights from Cluster, the first 3-D magnetospheric mission". Annales Geophysicae. 33 (10): 1221–1235. Bibcode:2015AnGeo..33.1221E. doi:10.5194/angeo-33-1221-2015. hdl:11603/31311.
- Escoubet, C.P.; M. Taylor; A. Masson; H. Laakso; J. Volpp; M. Hapgood; M.L. Goldstein (2013). "Dynamical processes in space: Cluster results". Annales Geophysicae. 31 (6): 1045–1059. Bibcode:2013AnGeo..31.1045E. doi:10.5194/angeo-31-1045-2013.
- Taylor, M.; C.P. Escoubet; H. Laakso; A. Masson; M. Goldstein (2010). "The Cluster Mission: Space Plasma in Three Dimensions". In H. Laakso; et al. (eds.). The Cluster Active Archive. Astrophysics and Space Science Proceedings. pp. 309–330. doi:10.1007/978-90-481-3499-1_21. ISBN 978-90-481-3498-4.
- Escoubet, C.P.; M. Fehringer; M. Goldstein (2001). "The Cluster mission". Annales Geophysicae. 19 (10/12): 1197–1200. Bibcode:2001AnGeo..19.1197E. doi:10.5194/angeo-19-1197-2001. hdl:11603/30657.
- Escoubet, C.P.; R. Schmidt; M.L. Goldstein (1997). "Cluster - Science and Mission Overview". Space Science Reviews. 79 (1–2): 11–32. Bibcode:1997SSRv...79...11E. doi:10.1023/A:1004923124586. hdl:11603/30578. S2CID 116954846.
