= Rumi (disambiguation) =

Rumi (1207–1273) was a Persian poet, Islamic scholar, and Sufi mystic.

Rumi may also refer to:

- Rumi, (literally "Roman") any person, non-Muslim or Muslim, such as the Muslim Sufi poet Rumi, who was from the lands of Rum (literally "Romans" or "Rome") —traditionally divided into Rumelia and Anatolia— during most of the Rum-Seljuk and Ottoman times. Also used as an adjective denoting anything relating to these people.
- Al-Rumi, people with a nisba (surname) derived from the historical region(s) of the Rum
- Rumi (given name), a Japanese given name
- Shafi Imam Rumi, a guerrilla fighter of the Bangladesh Liberation War
- Rumi Verjee (born 1957), British-Indian businessman and politician
- Rumi Darwaza, gateway in Lucknow, Uttar Pradesh, India
- Rumi (opera), a Persian-language opera by Behzad Abdi
- Rumi calendar, a calendar used by the Ottoman Empire
- Rumi cheese, a hard cheese from cows' milk, or from a mixture of cow and buffalo milk, produced in Egypt
- Rumi Numeral System, used in North Africa and Iberia between the 10th and 17th centuries
- Rumi script, a Malay alphabet
- Rumi, a character from KPop Demon Hunters

== See also ==
- Rum (disambiguation)
