= Rumi Nakamura =

Japanese geoscientist

- Education: University of Tokyo (BSc, PhD)
- Known for: Solar – terrestrial interactions
- Scientific career
- Workplaces: National Institute of Polar Research; Goddard Space Flight Center; Austrian Academy of Sciences; Max Planck Institute for Extraterrestrial Physics

Rumi Nakamura is an Earth scientist at the Austrian Academy of Sciences. She works on solar-terrestrial interactions, with a particular focus on the terrestrial magnetosphere. Nakamura won the 2014 European Geosciences Union Julius Bartels Medal.

== Early life and education ==
Nakamura grew up in Japan. Her father was a nuclear physicist. She accompanied him on a research project in Munich, and started elementary school in Germany. Nakamura learned German at the Goethe-Institut. Nakamura studied physics at the University of Tokyo, and earned a master's degree in 1987. During university she completed an internship with a Professor who worked on aurora. After her degree, she noticed that the male students in her class were receiving more job offers. She recognised that a bachelor's degree would not be enough for her, so applied for postgraduate diplomas. Nakamura spent two semesters in Munich before returning to the University of Tokyo for her doctoral studies, working on aurora dynamics associated with magnetospheric substorms. These included pseduobreakup and major expansion onset storms.

== Research and career ==
After earning her PhD, Nakamura moved to the National Institute of Polar Research where she worked as a research associate. At the time she was told that it was too early for women to go to the Antarctic. She joined the Goddard Space Flight Center in 1991, and wanted to become an astronaut. Nakamura says that her "problem was that I did not have such good teeth".

Nakamura was appointed an assistant professor with tenure at Nagoya University. She moved to the Max Planck Institute for Extraterrestrial Physics as a Senior Scientist in 1998. In 2001 Nakamura has served as the leader of the Space Research Institute at the Austrian Academy of Sciences. Here she works on plasma physics based on analysis from satellites. She was the first woman to be awarded the European Geosciences Union Julius Bartels Medal.

Her research considers plasma flow and the configuration of the electromagnetic field in the magnetotail during substorms. She used data from the Geotail, Cluster II, THEMIS and Double Star missions to confirm that the earthward moving fast flows of the plasma sheet are bubbles of low density plasma that is accompanied by depolarization fronts. Nakamura investigated the shape and size of these fronts, and showed that field aligned currents flow into and out of the ionosphere at their meridional flanks. Nakamura works on the European Space Agency Cluster program, which was launched in 2000. The satellites are designed to study geomagnetic storms and how they impact the Earth's magnetic field. There are four satellites which investigate the storms from different angles.

=== Awards and honours ===
- 1998 NASA Group Achievement Award
- 2005 Austrian Ministry for Transport, Innovation and Technology Woman Researcher of the Month
- 2005 Society of Geomagnetism and Earth, Planetary and Space Sciences Tanakadate Award
- 2014 European Geosciences Union Julius Bartels Medal
- 2018 Elected to AcademiaNet
- 2018 Elected fellow, American Geophysical Union
