= TC-2 =

TC-2 might refer to:

- Sky Sword II, a Taiwanese anti-aircraft missile also known as Tien Chien 2 or TC-2
- TC-2, the polar satellite used in the Double Star mission
