= Magnetic field of the Moon =

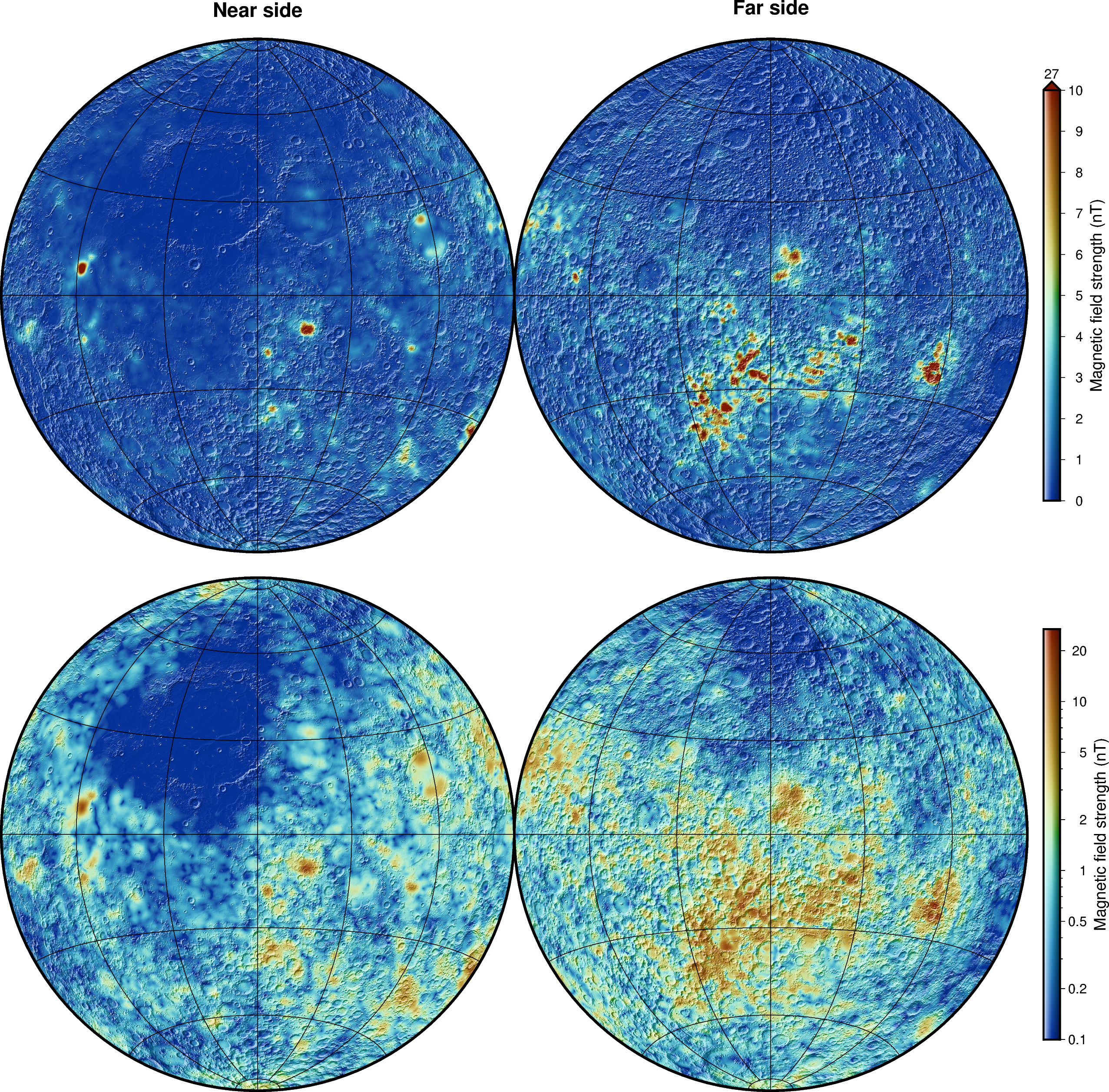
Total magnetic field strength 30 km above the surface of the Moon using a linear (upper) and logarithmic (lower) color scale. The nearside and farside hemispheres are on the left and right, and grid lines are plotted every 30 degrees of latitude and longitude. The magnetic field map is based on measurements from the Lunar Prospector and Kaguya spacecraft.

The magnetic field of the Moon is very weak in comparison to that of the Earth; the major difference is the Moon does not have a dipolar magnetic field currently (as would be generated by a geodynamo in its core), so that the magnetization present is varied (see picture) and its origin is almost entirely crustal in location; so it's difficult to compare as a percentage to Earth. But, one experiment discovered that lunar rocks formed 1 - 2.5 billion years ago were created in a field of about 5 microtesla (μT), compared to present day Earth's 50 μT. During the Apollo program several magnetic field strength readings were taken with readings ranging from a low of 6γ (6nT) at the Apollo 15 site to a maximum of 313γ (0.31μT) at the Apollo 16 site, note these readings were recorded in gammas(γ) a now outdated unit of magnetic flux density equivalent to 1nT.

One hypothesis holds that the crustal magnetizations were acquired early in lunar history when a geodynamo was still operating. An analysis of magnetized Moon rocks brought to Earth by Apollo astronauts showed that the Moon must have had a strong (above 110 μT) magnetic field at least 4.25 billion years ago, which then fell to 20 μT level in the 3.6 - 3.1 billion years BP period. The small size of the lunar core, however, is a potential obstacle to promoting that hypothesis to the status of theory. However, single silicate grains with magnetic inclusions from Apollo rocks formed at 3.9, 3.6, 3.3, and 3.2 billion years ago have been shown to be capable of recording strong magnetic fields but do not. This supports the alternative hypothesis that the Moon never had a long-lasting core dynamo, consistent with the lack of energy needed to sustain a field.

It is possible that on an airless body such as the Moon, transient magnetic fields could be generated during large impact events. In particular, study of Apollo impact glass associated with a young, 2 million-year-old crater has yielded a strong magnetization comparable in strength to Earth's magnetic field^{[5]}. This magnetization could not have originated in the lunar core, but is instead consistent with predictions from fields associated with impact plasmas^{[5]}. These observations have led to the hypothesis that prior reports of high paleofield strengths from Apollo samples record impacts, not a core dynamo^{[5,6]}. Importantly, the lack of a long-lasting lunar dynamo and paleomagnetosphere should have allowed ^{3}He, water, and other volatile resources acquired from the solar wind and Earth’s magnetosphere over some 4 billion years to accumulate in lunar soils ^{[5,6]}.

It has also been noted that the largest crustal magnetizations appear to be located near the antipodes of the giant impact basins. It has been proposed that such a phenomenon could result from the free expansion of an impact-generated plasma cloud around the Moon in the presence of an ambient magnetic field. For example, the Chandrayaan-1 spacecraft mapped a "mini-magnetosphere" at the Crisium antipode on the Moon's far side, using its Sub-keV Atom Reflecting Analyzer (SARA) instrument. The mini-magnetosphere is 360 km across at the surface and is surrounded by a 300-km-thick region of enhanced plasma flux that results from the solar wind flowing around the mini-magnetosphere.

There is growing evidence that fine particles of moondust might actually float, ejected from the lunar surface by electrostatic repulsion. This could create a temporary nighttime "atmosphere" of dust. The moondust atmosphere might also gather itself into a sort of diaphanous wind. Drawn by differences in global charge accumulation, floating dust would naturally fly from the strongly negative nightside to the weakly negative dayside. This "dust storm" effect would be strongest at the Moon's terminator. Much of these details are still speculative, but the Lunar Prospector spacecraft detected changes in the lunar nightside voltage during magnetotail crossings, jumping from -200 V to -1000 V. Further characterization was done by the Lunar Atmosphere and Dust Environment Explorer orbiter in late 2013.

The plasma sheet is a very dynamic structure, in a constant state of motion, so as the Moon orbits through the magnetotail the plasma sheet can sweep across it many times with encounters lasting anywhere from minutes to hours or even days.

== In fiction ==
In the Space Odyssey series by Arthur C. Clarke, a monolith is found on the Moon near the crater Tycho by its unnaturally powerful magnetic field and named Tycho Magnetic Anomaly 1 (TMA-1).

== See also ==
- Gravity field of the Moon
- Topography of the Moon
