= Rum (disambiguation) =

Rum is a distilled alcoholic beverage made from sugarcane by-products.

Rum or RUM may also refer to:

== Arts and entertainment ==
- Rum, a character in Case Closed
- Rum (film), a 2017 Indian film
- "Rum" (song), by Brothers Osborne, 2014
- "Rum", a song by Alestorm from the 2011 album Back Through Time

== People ==
- Andrey Rum (born 2002), Belarusian footballer
- Etaf Rum (fl. from 2019), Palestinian-American novelist
- Sultan e Rum (fl. from 2024), Pakistani politician

== Places ==
- Rùm, or Rum, an island of the Inner Hebrides, Scotland
- Rum, Tyrol, Austria
- Rum, Hungary
- Rum, Iran
- Rum, Nepal
- Rum Cay, Bahamas
- Rum Hill, New York, United States, a mountain
- Rum Island (Tasmania), Australia
- Rum River, Minnesota, United States
- Rum Creek (Ocmulgee River tributary), Georgia, United States
- Rum Creek (West Virginia), United States
- Sultanate of Rum, a Seljuk sultanate in Anatolia 1077–1307
  - Rûm Eyalet, an Ottoman administrative division in Anatolia 1398–1864
- Wadi Rum, a valley in Jordan

== Transportation ==
- Rumjatar Airport, Nepal, IATA code RUM
- Air Rum, a former airline in Sierra Leone

== Other uses ==
- Rum (name), of pre-Islamic inhabitants of Anatolia and of other places
- Remington Ultra Magnum (RUM), a family of gun cartridges
- Real user monitoring (RUM), measuring internet web application performance
- University of Puerto Rico at Mayagüez (Recinto Universitario de Mayagüez, RUM)
- Remote Underwater Manipulator, a bottom crawler for underwater exploration
- Rigid unit modes, lattice vibrations or phonons that exist in network materials such as quartz
- Romanian language, ISO-639-2/B language code rum

== See also ==
- Rumi (disambiguation)
- Rumes, a municipality in Belgium
