= Isa ibn Aban =

Early Islamic scholar of Abbasid Era

ʿĪsā b. Abān
- Died: 836/221 AH

Philosophical work
- Era: Abbasid Caliphate
- School: Hanafi
- Main interests: Usul al-Fiqh

Abu Musa ʿĪsā b. Abān was an early Sunni Islamic scholar who followed the Hanafi madhhab. Although none of his own works have survived to today, he was quoted extensively by early Hanafi scholars such as Al-Jassas in regards to his views on Hanafi usul al-fiqh. Having studied under Abu Hanifa's student, Muhammad al-Shaybani, ibn Abān's views on the sources of law can be assumed to be representative of Abu Hanifa's.

== Biography ==
Ibn Abān initially studied hadith, and was not known to be associated with ahl al-ra'y, as the Hanafis were called. His views changed when he began to study with Muhammad al-Shaybani, one of Abu Hanifa's primary students. He later became a member of the Abbasid prince al-Ma'mun's court, earning his favor by writing a treatise critical of the jurisprudential views of another scholar in the court. He would later go on to serve as a qadi in Baghdad and Basra.

== Views ==
Much of what is known about ibn Abān's views on usul al-fiqh is based on what Abu Bakr al-Jassas quotes in his book, Al-Usul fi al-Fusul. Ibn Abān argued in favor of classifying khabar (i.e. Hadith reports) according to how well-known and widespread the report was. In his theory, the only Hadith reports that can be considered entirely authentic are ones that are narrated by large groups of people (mutawatir), indicating that their fabrication was highly unlikely. Hadith reports that are not as widespread still had a role in jurisprudence according to ibn Abān, but they would not be as unquestionable as mutawatir reports.

Ibn Abān also advocates judging Hadith reports by comparing them with relevant passages from the Qur'an. He differs significantly here with his contemporary al-Shafi'i who argued that if the narration chain of a Hadith is judged to be strong, no further criticism of the Hadith report was necessary.

== Works ==
According to al-Jassas, ʿĪsā ibn Abān authored four works, none of which survive to today:

- Al-Hujaj al-Saghir
- Al-Hujaj al-Kabir
- Kitab al-Radd 'ala Bishr al-Marisi (wa'l Shafi'i) fi'l Akhbar
- Kitab al-Mujmal wa'l Mufassar

== Literature ==
- Josef van Ess: Theologie und Gesellschaft im 2. und 3. Jahrhundert Hidschra. Eine Geschichte des religiösen Denkens im frühen Islam. De Gruyter, Berlin 1991–1997, 6 volumes, v. 2, 302; v. 3, 60 f., 181; v. 4, 280, 652; v. 5, 353.
