= Cami-i Rumi =

Ottoman translator

Ahmet Câmî-i Rûmî (Note: Also spelled Ahmad Jami-e Rumi.) also known as Câmî-i Mısrî (Note: Also spelled Jami-e Mesri.) was an Ottoman official, poet and translator who flourished in the 16th century.

== Biography ==
Almost nothing is known about Câmî-i Rûmî apart from his career. Not even the dates and places of his birth and death are known. He served as a soldier in the royal Ottoman court in Constantinople (present-day Istanbul, Turkey) before being appointed treasurer in the Egypt Eyalet under Sultan Suleiman the Magnificent (r. 1520–1566). While in Egypt, four of his sons died during a plague. Câmî-i Rûmî was subsequently sent to Mecca for three years, where he oversaw the renovation of the Ka'aba (c. 1551-55).

Thereafter, he returned to Constantinople, where he received promotion before leaving for Egypt once again. During his second stay in Egypt he translated Husayn Kashifi's Rawżat ol-šohadāʾ from Persian into Turkish for Sultan Suleiman. He entitled his translation the Sa'adat-nama; he used simple language, but embellished it with poems of Turkish and Persian poets. He received recognition for the quality of his translation, and was subsequently appointed governor of a sanjak in Egypt. He continued serving as governor under Sultan Murad III (r. 1574–1595).

Osman G. Özgüdenli notes that Câmî-i Rûmî's writings were never collected in a divan. However, he adds that some of his poems are found in tazkeras and anthologies. There are many extant manuscripts of Câmî-i Rûmî's translation. The oldest (dated 1578) is stored at the Topkapı Palace Library.

== Sources ==
- Özgüdenli, Osman G. (2008). "JĀMI RUMI". In Yarshater, Ehsan (ed.). Encyclopædia Iranica. Vol. XIV/5: Jamalzadeh, Mohammad-Ali II. Work–Japan IV. Iranians in Japan. London and New York: Routledge & Kegan Paul. pp. 482–483. ISBN 978-1-934283-06-6.
