= Halaqa =

Open Islamic discussion forum

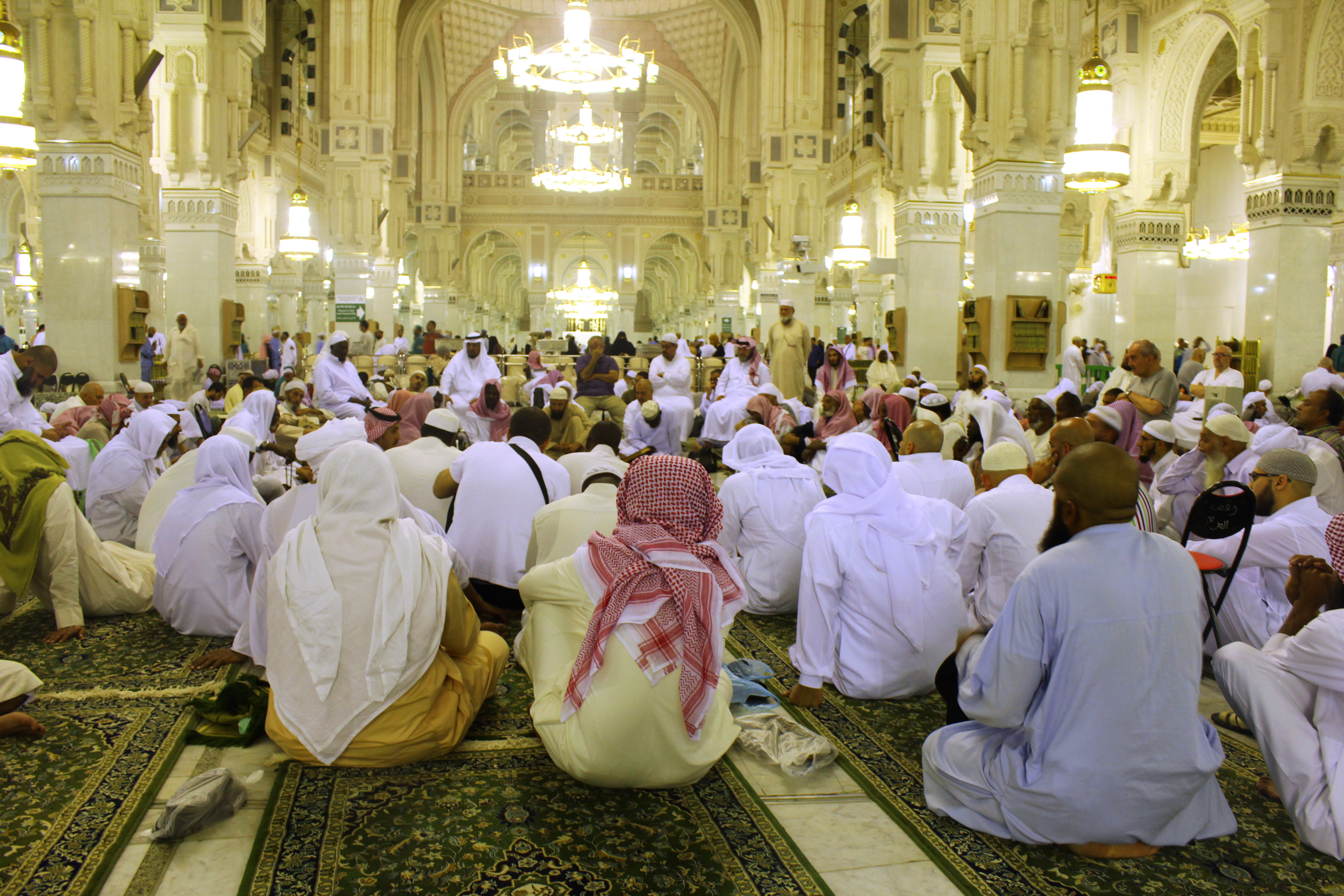
A halaqa is underway inside the main complex of Masjid al-Haram in Makkah, Saudi Arabia.

Halaqa (Arabic: حلقة, romanized: Ḥalaqah, lit. 'circle/ring') in Islamic terminology refers to a religious gathering or meeting for the study of Islam and the Quran. Generally, there are one or more primary speakers that present the designated topic(s) of the halaqa while others sit around them (in an approximate circle) and listen. The attendees may participate in the discussions, ask questions, and voice concerns. Usually, prayers and supplications are part of such programs. Also, meals or snacks may be served to the participants.

== See also ==
- Qiyam
