= Merlin Swartz =

American scholar of religion (born 1933)

Merlin Swartz (July 31, 1933 – February 21, 2022) was an American scholar of religion.

Swartz attended Eastern Mennonite University (BA, 1955), Goshen College (BD, 1960), and Harvard University (PhD, 1967). He was professor emeritus of Religion (Islamic Studies) at Boston University, having taught previously at the American University in Beirut and Harvard Center for Middle Eastern Studies. His research and teaching focused primarily on the religious and intellectual history of medieval Islam.

== Books ==
- Ibn al-Jawzi, Kitab al-Qussas wa'l-Mudhakkirin (tr., intro.) (Institut de Lettres Orientales, Beirut 1971).
- A Seventh-Century Sunni Creed: The 'Aqida Wasitiya of Ibn Taymiya (Mouton 1974).
- Studies on Islam (Oxford 1981).
- Humaniora Islamica, co-editor (Mouton 1973–1974).
- A Medieval Critique of Anthropomorphism: Ibn al-Jawzi's Kitab Akhbar as-Sifat: A Critical Edition of the Arabic Text with Translation, Introduction and Notes (E.J. Brill, 2002).
