= Rumiko =

Rumiko (written: 留美子, るみ子, ルミ子 or ルミコ) is a feminine Japanese given name. Notable people with the name include:

- Rumiko Koyanagi (小柳 ルミ子; born 1952), Japanese actress and singer
- Rumiko Takahashi (高橋 留美子; born 1957), Japanese manga artist
- Rumiko Tani (谷 ルミコ; born 1979), Korean-Japanese television personality and a former idol singer
- Rumiko Ukai (鵜飼 るみ子; born 1955), Japanese voice actress
- Rumiko Varnes (born 1969), American voice actress

== Fictional characters ==
- Rumiko, fictional character in the anime and manga series Goldfish Warning!
- Rumiko, fictional character in the animated film Hal (2013 film)
- Rumiko, fictional character in the psychological thriller drama film Motherhood (2022 Japanese film)
- Rumiko, fictional character in the tokusatsu television series Nebula Mask Machineman
- Rumiko, fictional character in the anthology film Pink Lady no Katsudō Daishashin
- Rumiko, fictional character in the film Romantic Daughters
- Rumiko Chie, fictional character in the anime series Higurashi When They Cry
- Rumiko Daijōji, fictional character in the manga series Miracle Girls
- Rumiko Fujikawa, fictional character appearing in American comic books published by Marvel Comics who first appeared in The Invincible Iron Man in 1998
- Rumiko Hiiragi, fictional character in the manga series Karada Sagashi
- Rumiko Himuro, fictional character in the television drama series Long Vacation
- Rumiko Hoshiyama, fictional character in the tokusatsu series Assault! Human!!
- Rumiko Iwashita, fictional character in the anime and manga series Anyamaru Tantei Kiruminzuu
- Rumiko Komatsu, fictional character in the manga series Kounodori: Dr. Stork
- Rumiko Kuhou, fictional character in the manga series Franken Fran
- Rumiko Manbagi, fictional character in the anime and manga series Komi Can't Communicate
- Rumiko Murano, fictional character in the tokusatsu television series Return of Ultraman
- Rumiko Nakato, fictional character in the anime OVA series Garzey's Wing
- Rumiko Okamoto, fictional character in the biopic 26 Years Diary
- Rumiko Ōtaki, fictional character in the erotic film Sins of Sister Lucia
- Rumiko Sakamoto, fictional character in the anime series Aquarian Age: Sign for Evolution
- Rumiko Sasaki, fictional character in the television drama series Stand Up!! (Japanese TV series)
- Rumiko Yamazaki, fictional character in the film Welcome Back, Mr. McDonald
- Rumiko Yanagi, fictional character in the film Subarashiki dansei

== Others ==
- Papilio rumiko, a species of swallowtail butterfly
- Rümikon, a village in Switzerland
