= Al-Rumi =

al-Rumi (Arabic: الرومي, also transcribed as ar-Rumi), or its Persian variant of simply Rumi, is a nisba denoting a person from or related to the historical region(s) specified by the name Rûm. It may refer to:

- Jalāl ad-Dīn Muhammad Rūmī, Persian poet, Islamic jurist, theologian, and mystic commonly referred to by the moniker Rumi
- Suhayb ar-Rumi, a companion of Muhammad
- Qāḍī Zāda al-Rūmī, 14th-century mathematician
- Ibn al-Rumi, 9th-century Arabic poet
- Dhuka al-Rumi, 10th-century Abbasid governor of Egypt
- Al-Adli ar-Rumi, 9th-century Arab chess player and theoretician
- Mustafa Rumi, 16th-century Ottoman general
- Sarjun ibn Mansur al-Rumi, Umayyad official
- Yāqūt Shihāb al-Dīn ibn-'Abdullāh al-Rūmī al-Hamawī, 13th-century scholar
- Ahmet Câmî-i Rûmî, 16th-century Ottoman official
- Shah Sultan Rumi, 11th-century Sufi saint of Bengal
