= TDV Encyclopedia of Islam =

Encyclopedia of Islam
- Editor: Türkiye Diyanet Foundation
- Author: Various scholars
- Original title: İslâm Ansiklopedisi
- Language: Turkish
- Subject: Islam, Islamic studies
- Genre: Reference work
- Publisher: Türkiye Diyanet Foundation
- Publication date: 1988–present
- Publication place: Turkey
- Media type: Print, Online
- Pages: 44 volumes (ongoing)
- Website: islamansiklopedisi.org.tr

Türkiye Diyanet Vakfı İslâm Ansiklopedisi (abbreviated to TDV Encyclopedia of Islam, TDV İA or DİA) is sometimes regarded as a successor to İslâm Ansiklopedisi. DİA is a completely original work, which was published in 44 volumes from 1988 to December 2013, with two supplementary volumes published in 2016. It contains 16,855 articles in total.

The academic quality of DİA is recognized by Turkologists and Turkish-speaking scholars of Islamic studies.

== Volumes ==
| Volume | Year | First article | Last article |
|---|---|---|---|
| 1 | 1988 | Âb-ı Hayat | El-ahkâmü'ş-şer'i̇yye |
| 2 | 1989 | Ahlâk | Amari̇ |
| 3 | 1991 | Amasya | Âşik Mûsi̇ki̇si̇ |
| 4 | 1991 | Âşik Ömer | Bâlâ Külli̇yesi̇ |
| 5 | 1992 | Balaban | Beşi̇r Ağa |
| 6 | 1992 | Beşi̇r Ağa Cami̇i̇ | Câfer Paşa Tekkesi̇ |
| 7 | 1993 | Ca'fer es-Sâdik | Ci̇ltçi̇li̇k |
| 8 | 1993 | Ci̇lve | Dârünnedve |
| 9 | 1994 | Dârüsaâde | Dulkadi̇roğullari |
| 10 | 1994 | Dûmetülcendel | Elbi̇se |
| 11 | 1995 | Elbi̇stan | Eymi̇r |
| 12 | 1995 | Eys | Fikhü'l-Hadîs |
| 13 | 1996 | Fikih | Gelenek |
| 14 | 1996 | Geli̇bolu | Haddesenâ |
| 15 | 1997 | Hades | Hanefî Mehmed |
| 16 | 1997 | Hanefî Mezhebi̇ | Hayâ |
| 17 | 1998 | Hayal | Hi̇lâfi̇yat |
| 18 | 1998 | Hi̇lâl | Hüseyi̇n Lâmekânî |
| 19 | 1999 | Hüseyi̇n Mi̇rza | İbn Haldûn |
| 20 | 1999 | İbn Haldûn | İbnü'l-Cezerî |
| 21 | 2000 | İbnü'l-Cezzâr | İhvân-ı Müsli̇mîn |
| 22 | 2000 | İhvân-ı Safâ | İski̇t |
| 23 | 2001 | İslâm | Kaade |
| 24 | 2001 | Kāânî-i Şîrâzî | Kastamonu |
| 25 | 2002 | Kasti̇lya | Ki̇le |
| 26 | 2002 | Ki̇li̇ | Kütahya |
| 27 | 2003 | Kütahya Mevlevîhânesi̇ | Mani̇sa |
| 28 | 2003 | Mani̇sa Mevlevîhânesi̇ | Meks |
| 29 | 2004 | Mekteb | Misir Mevlevîhânesi̇ |
| 30 | 2005 | Misra | Muhammedi̇yye |
| 31 | 2006 | Muhammedi̇yye | Münâzara |
| 32 | 2006 | el-Münci̇d | Nasi̇h |
| 33 | 2007 | Nesi̇h | Osmanlilar |
| 34 | 2007 | Osmanpazari | Resuldar |
| 35 | 2008 | Resûlîler | Sak |
| 36 | 2009 | Sakal | Sevm |
| 37 | 2009 | Sevr Antlaşmasi | Suveylîh |
| 38 | 2010 | Suyolcu | Şeri̇f en-Nîsâbûrî |
| 39 | 2010 | Şeri̇f Paşa | Tanzanya |
| 40 | 2011 | Tanzi̇mat | Teveccüh |
| 41 | 2012 | Tevekkül | Tüsterî |
| 42 | 2012 | Tütün | Vehran |
| 43 | 2013 | Vekâlet | Yûsî |
| 44 | 2013 | Yusuf | Zwemer |
| Supp. 1 | 2016 | Abazalar | Kaftan |
| Supp. 2 | 2016 | Kâfûr, Ebü'l-Misk | Züreyk, Kostantin |

== Awards ==
- 2014: Presidential Culture and Arts Grand Awards
