= Double Star (satellite) =

Chinese-European joint satellite

- Names: Tan Ce (Explorer)
- Mission type: Earth observation
- Operator: CNSA · ESA
- COSPAR ID: 2003-061A (TC-1); 2004-029A (TC-2)
- SATCAT no.: 28140 (TC-1); 28382 (TC-2)
- Website: ESA website (archive)
- Mission duration: 3 years, 9 months, 15 days (TC-1); In Orbit: 21 years, 8 months and 13 days (TC-2)

Start of mission
- Launch date: 29 December 2003, 19:06 UTC (TC-1); 25 July 2004, 07:05 UTC (TC-2)
- Rocket: Long March 2C
- Launch site: Xichang Satellite Launch Center; Taiyuan Satellite Launch Center

End of mission
- Disposal: Deorbited (TC-1)
- Decay date: 14 October 2007 (TC-1)
- Contemporary ESA insignia (2000s)

Double Star was a joint satellite based space mission by the China National Space Administration (CNSA) and the European Space Agency (ESA). It was the first space mission launched by China to investigate Earth's magnetosphere. It consisted of two satellites: an Equatorial satellite (TC-1) and Polar satellite (TC-2). Double Star followed in the footsteps of ESA's Cluster mission by studying the effects of the Sun on the Earth's environment. After a nominal mission of one year (from the launch of TC-2 in July 2004), the Double Star mission was extended twice by both agencies until the end of September 2007.

== Overview ==
The Double Star mission used two satellites in Earth orbit - each designed, developed, launched, and operated by the China National Space Administration. ESA has agreed to contribute 8 million Euros to the Double Star programme. This funding was used for refurbishment and pre-integration of the European instruments, acquisition of data for four hours per day and co-ordination of scientific operations. This schedule enabled Double Star to operate simultaneously with ESA's Cluster mission.

The first equatorial spacecraft (Double Star 1, also known as DoubleStar1, Tan Ce 1, Chinese for Explorer 1, TC-1) was launched by a Long March 2C launch vehicle on 29 December 2003, at 19:06 UTC. Its purpose was to investigate Earth's huge 'magnetotail', the region where particles are accelerated towards the planet's magnetic poles by a process known as 'reconnection'.

The second polar spacecraft (Double Star 2, also known as DoubleStar2, Explorer 2, Tan Ce 2, TC-2) was launched 25 July 2004 at 07:05 UTC, also by a Long March 2C. It focuses on physical processes taking place over the magnetic poles and the development of aurorae.

The mission formally ended on 14 October 2007, when the TC-1 spacecraft re-entered the Earth's atmosphere after being decommissioned (an unavoidable consequence of its equatorial orbit). The TC-2 spacecraft and payload continued to operate until late 2008, when contact was lost.

== Launch and orbits ==
TC-1 was launched into an equatorial elliptical orbit of 570 x 78 970 km with inclination 28.5° to the equator from the Xichang Satellite Launch Center. This apogee of this mission was the deepest into space China had ever sent a spacecraft at that time.

The TC-2 spacecraft was launched into a polar elliptical orbit of 700 x 39 000 km, inclination 90° to the equator from Taiyuan Satellite Launch Center.
