= Plasma sheet =

Region of denser plasma in a magnetotail

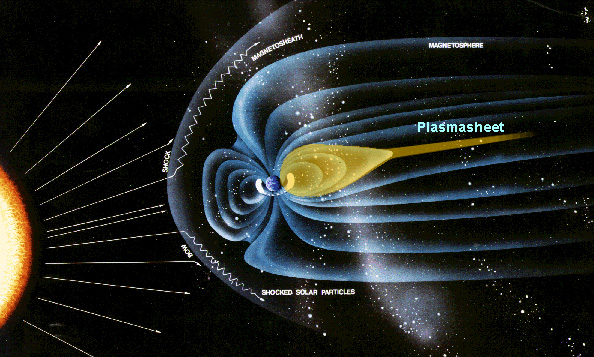
Artistic representation of Earth's magnetosphere. The plasma sheet is highlighted in yellow.

In the magnetosphere, the plasma sheet is a sheet-like region of denser hot plasma and lower magnetic field located on the magnetotail and near the equatorial plane, between the magnetosphere's north and south lobes. In the near-Earth magnetotail (roughly 7–20 R_{E}), the central plasma sheet typically has ion number densities of about 0.1–0.5 cm^{−3}, whereas the adjacent tail lobes contain much more tenuous plasma with densities of order 0.01–0.1 cm^{−3}, i.e. roughly an order of magnitude lower.

The origin of the plasma sheet is still a subject of discussion on magnetospheric physics but it is thought that the region plays an important role on the transport of plasma around the Earth from the magnetotail towards the Sun. The plasma sheet is closely related to the convective motion of plasma on the magnetotail occurring as a result of magnetic field reconnection.
