= Abu Bakr bin Yahya al-Suli =

10th-century Turkic scholar at Abbasid court

Abū Bakr Muḥammad ibn Yaḥyā ibn al-‘Abbās al-Ṣūli أبو بكر محمد بن يحيى بن العباس الصولي
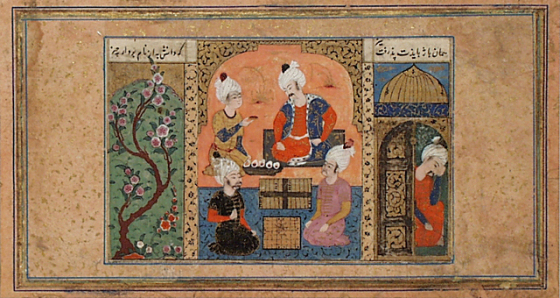
- Born: c. 870; Gorgan, Iran
- Died: between 941/948; Basra, Iraq
- Other names: Abu Bakr, Ibn Yahya, Muhammad
- Occupation: Abbasid courtier
- Years active: 908 – 941
- Era: Islamic Golden Age (Middle Abbasid era)
- Known for: Court companion of three Abbasid caliphs: al-Muktafi, al-Muqtadir, and al-Radi
- Notable work: Kitāb Al-Awrāq; Kitāb al-Shiṭranj
- Father: Yaḥyā ibn al-‘Abbās

Abū Bakr Muḥammad ibn Yaḥyā ibn al-‘Abbās al-Ṣūlī (Arabic: أبو بكر محمد بن يحيى بن العباس الصولي) (born c. 870 Gorgan – died between 941 and 948 Basra) was a Turkic scholar and a court companion of three Abbāsid caliphs: al-Muktafī, his successor al-Muqtadir, and later, al-Radi, whom he also tutored. He was a bibliophile, wrote letters, editor-poet, chronicler, and a shatranj (chess) player. His contemporary biographer Isḥāq al-Nadīm tells us he was "of manly bearing." He wrote many books, the most famous of which are Kitāb Al-Awrāq and Kitāb al-Shiṭranj.

== Life ==
Abū Bakr al-Ṣūlī was born into an illustrious family of Turkic origin, his great-grandfather was the Turkic prince Sul-takin and his uncle was the poet Ibrahim ibn al-'Abbas as-Suli. Al-Marzubānī, a principal pupil of al-Ṣūlī, who admired him and copied him in the art of compilation, borrowed much of al-Ṣūlī's material for his Kitāb al-Muwashshaḥ. Abū al-Faraj al-Iṣbahānī made extensive use of his material in his Kitāb al-Aghānī. On Caliph al-Rāḍī's death in 940, al-Ṣūlī fell into disfavour with the new ruler due to his Shi'a sympathies and he died hiding at al-Baṣrah, for having quoted a passage about ‘Alī, which caused a public scandal.

=== Chess ===
Al-Ṣūlī was among a group of tenth-century chess players who wrote books about the game of shaṭranj, i.e. "chess". (Note: The word shiṭranj, often written shaṭranj, is a corrupted form of the Indian word chaturanga, which was originally a military term. The word "chess" derives from shāh or shaykh.)

Al-Ṣūlī's books were:

- Kitāb al-Shiṭranj al-Nisḥa al-Awala (كتاب الشطرنج النسخة الاولة) ‘Chess, the first manuscript’;
- Kitāb al-Shiṭranj al-Nisḥa ath-Thānīa (كتاب الشطرنج النسخة الثانية) Chess, the second manuscript; Book on chess strategy, common chess openings, standard problems in middle game, annotated end games and the first known description of the knight's tour problem.

Sometime between 902 and 908, al-Ṣūlī played and beat the reigning shaṭranj champion, al-Mawardī, at the court of Caliph al-Muktafī, and the Caliph of Baghdad. When al-Muktafī died, al-Ṣūlī retained the favour of the succeeding rulers, Caliph al-Muqtadir and Caliph al-Radi.

His biographer Ibn Khallikan, (d. 1282), relates that even in his lifetime the phrase "to play like al-Ṣūlī" was to show great skill at shaṭranj. His endgame strategies are still studied. Contemporary biographers mention his skill in blindfold chess. Al-Ṣūlī also taught shaṭranj. Many later European writers based their work on modern chess on al-Suli's work.

=== Other Chess players/authors in the Group ===
- Al-‘Adlī (العَدْلى) wrote:

– Kitāb al-Shiṭranj (كتاب الشطرنج) ‘Chess’, the first book on chess, (Note: Al-Nadīm tells us that al-‘Adlī wrote the first book on the game of chess.) and; – Al-Nard, wa Isbābha wa-al-La’ab bīha (كتاب النرد واسبابها واللعب بها). 'Al-Nard Its Elements and Play'. (Note: Al-nardashīr, board games like backgammon or checkers. See "Shaṭrandj," Enc. Islām, IV, 338; Asiatic Journal and Monthly Register, V (June, 1818), 121.)

- Al-Rāzī (الرازى) was a chess rival of al-‘Adlī and the caliph Al-Mutawakkil attended their matches. He wrote:

– Kitāb latīf fī al- Shiṭranj (كتاب لطيف في الشطرنج) ‘A Delightful Book about Chess.’

- Abū al-Faraj Muḥammad ibn ‘Ubayd Allāh al-Lajlāj ("the stammerer") (ابو الفرج محمد بن عبيد الله اللَجْلاج), whom Isḥāq al-Nadīm had met, was his best known pupil. He excelled at chess at the Būyid court of king ‘Aḍud al-Dawlah in Shīrāz, where he died sometime after 970/71 [360 AH]. He wrote:

– Manṣūbāt al-Shiṭranj (منصوبات الشطرنج) ‘The Stratagems of Chess.’

- Ibn al-Uqlīdasī Abū Isḥāq Ibrāhīm ibn Muḥammad ibn Ṣāliḥ, one of the most skilful chess players, who wrote A Collection of the Stratagems of Chess.

=== Al-Suli's Diamond ===
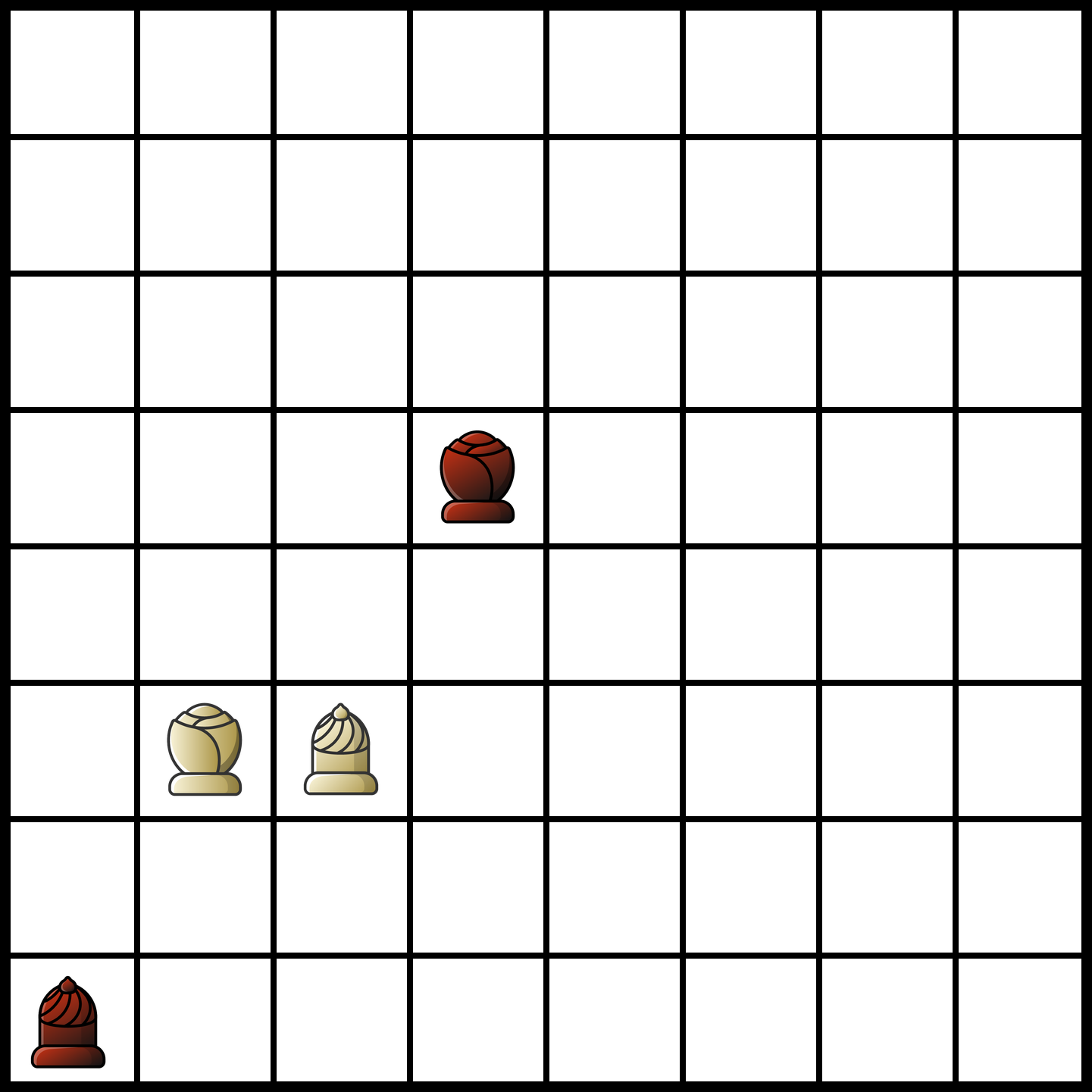
Canonical diagram of Al-Ṣūlī's Diamond. White to move and win. FEN: 8/8/8/3k4/8/1KQ5/8/q7 w

Al-Ṣūlī's shaṭranj endgame study, called "Al-Ṣūlī's Diamond", "As-Suli's Diamond" or "Suli's Diamond", went unsolved for over a thousand years. Shatranj is the predecessor to modern chess, where the "ferz" or "vizier", meaning counsellor, is a very weak piece, able to move and attack only a single square diagonally. It is possible to win in shaṭranj by capturing all pieces except the king, unless the opponent is able to do the same on the next move.

This position is ancient old, yet neither al-‘Adlī nor any one else has said whether it is drawn or can be won. Nor has any one interpreted it, or pointed (diagrammed) it because of its difficulty. There is no one on earth who has solved it unless he was taught it by me. I have never learnt that there was any one before; for if any one had solved it, he would either have written down the solution, or have taught it to some one else. This is the word of as-Ṣūlī. (9th century)

— From the manuscript now identified with the Süleymaniye Library, Lala İsmail Collection MS 560, Istanbul; referred to by Murray in A History of Chess as from the library of Sultan Abdul Hamid

David Hooper and Ken Whyld studied this problem in the mid-1980s, but the solution published in the first edition of The Oxford Companion to Chess in 1984 overlooked Black's strongest defensive line on move 3 and was considered incorrect. The first correct solution was reconstructed from the three manuscript positions and is credited to the leading endgame theoretician, grandmaster, and former chairman of the USSR Chess Federation, Yuri Averbakh, who first published his solution in the 10th bulletin of the 1986 Chess Olympiad in Dubai.

According to the second edition of The Oxford Companion to Chess, published in 1992, mathematician John Beasley provided the first computer-generated solution using the stronger defence 6...Kf8 instead of 6...Kg8. The first move of the solution had already been given by Al-Ṣūlī in the Istanbul manuscript discussed by Murray in A History of Chess. The full solution to Al-Ṣūlī's Diamond, beginning with 1.Kb4, is given in Averbakh's writings later collected in In Search of Truth, in Ree's The Human Comedy of Chess, and in online analyses. The full solution to Al-Ṣūlī's Diamond, beginning with 1.Kb4, is given in Averbakh's writings later collected in In Search of Truth, in Ree's The Human Comedy of Chess, and in online analyses. The position can be tried under historical shatranj rules on the shatranj.ai play board by entering the FEN position.

A video walkthrough of the solution along with the historical sources of the discovery story, produced as part of the Shatranj.ai Erasmus+ educational curriculum project and including a reproduction of the relevant page from the 10th bulletin of the 1986 Chess Olympiad in Dubai, is available online.

Subsequent computer analysis has produced related positions. In 2015, John Tromp described "Suli's Rough Diamond", a related four-piece shaṭranj position with a distance-to-win of 53 plies, which transposes into the canonical Suli's Diamond with 39 plies distance-to-win after best play from both sides. In 2026, the endgame study association ARVES listed additional related positions by Tamer Karatekin, shah+ferz vs. shah+ferz, including the Suli-Karatekin Tough Diamond with 63 plies, Suli-Karatekin Concave Tough Diamond, Suli's Little Diamond, and Suli's Flipped Diamond, with their FEN positions and links to a longer technical article. Explanations of the code and tablebase-generation methods used for Suli's Diamond and related four-piece shaṭranj positions are available in the shatranj.ai curriculum materials.

The position, as with all shatranj positions with 6 pieces or less, can be probed from shatranj Syzygy tablebases.

== Works ==
=== Kitāb Al-Awrāq ===
- Kitāb Al-Awrāq (كتاب الاوراق) ‘Leaves’ or ‘Folios’; unfinished work on the traditions of the caliphs and the poets; the poems and chronicles of the sons of the caliphs, from al-Saffāḥ to Ibn al-Mu‘tazz (750–908) and poems of other members of the Banū al-‘Abbās who were neither caliphs nor sons of caliphs in rank. This included the poetry of ‘Abd Allāh ibn ‘Alī (عبد الله بن على), the poetry of Abū Aḥmad Muḥammad ibn Aḥmad ibn Ismā’īl ibn Ibrāhīm ibn ‘Īsā ibn al-Manṣūr (ابو احمد محمد بن احمد بن اسمعيل بن ابراهيم بن عيسى بن المنصور), the poems of members of the family of Abū Ṭālib the descendants of al-Ḥasan and al-Ḥusayn, the descendants of al-‘Abbās ibn ‘Alī, the descendants of ‘Umar ibn ‘Alī, and the descendants of Ja‘far ibn Abī Ṭālib; (Note: The Arabic word walad may mean either "descendant" or "son." For the members of the family of Abū Ṭālib.) poems of the descendants of al-Ḥārith ibn ‘Abd al-Muṭṭalib; traditions about, and selected poems by, Ibn Harmah; traditions about al-Sayyid al-Ḥimyarī (السيد الحميرى), (Note: "Al-Ḥimyarī" given by Flügel and Yāqūt , but omitted in Beatty and Tonk MSS of Al-Fihrist,) with a selection of his poetry; traditions about, and selected poems by, Aḥmad ibn Yūsuf (احمد بن يوسف); traditions about Sudayf (Note: Before "traditions about Sudayf" the Beatty MS has "traditions of Isḥāq ibn Ibrāhīm [al-Mawṣilī], with a selection of his poetry.") with a selection of his poetry. Ishaq al-Nadīm speculates that al-Ṣūlī plagiarized al-Marthadī's book on poetry and the poets, as he had seen a copy of his book that had come from al-Ṣūlī's library.
  - Kitāb Al-Awrāq published in three parts (1934–6, London):

– i) Kitāb al-Awrāķ (Section on Contemporary Poets): contains anthologies of poets of the Muḥadathūn (modern poets) and their diwans. Al-Ṣūlī was interested in the lesser known poets. Al-Mas'ūdī highly esteemed him for his unique recording of people and events. Of the fourteen poets al-Ṣūlī cites, Abān ibn ‘Abdal-Ḥamīd al-Lāḥiķī and Ashja ibn ‘Amr al-Sulamī are the best known. Part of Abān's versification of the Kalīla wa Dimna written for Yaḥyā ibn Khālid al-Barmakī is preserved and published in the edited Arabic edition by James Heyworth-Dunne (1934).

– ii) Akhbar al-Rāḍī wa'l-Muttaqī; chronicle covering a thirteen-year period of the reigns of the caliphs al-Rāḍī—whom al-Ṣūlī had tutored and been a close companion of—and al-Muttaqī. It contains many fresh details of their reigns and the literary activities of the court. Although less famous than the histories of al-Mas'ūdī and Miskawayh, al-Ṣūlī's is an eyewitness-account of the transition to Buyid rule. The position of amir al-umara was created in 936 during al-Radi's caliphate, which devolved some caliphal executive powers to amirs (princes). The Buyid amirs later exerted these powers to establish their independent dynasty within the Caliphate and the Abbāsid's never regained their full power. However, al-Ṣūlī's account makes clear the limits of the devolved powers to the amirs.

– iii) Ash’ār Awlād al-Khulafā’ wa-Akhbāruhum; chronicle of the House of al-'Abbās who were poets.

=== Other Works ===
- Kitāb al-Wazrā (كتاب الوزرآء) The Viziers;
- Kitāb al-'Abādah (كتاب العبادة) Worship;
- Kitāb Adb al-Kātib 'alā al-Haqīqa (كتاب ادب الكاتب على الحقيقة) Training of the Secretary, according to Standard; (Note: The Beatty and Tonk MSS have "secretaries", whereas Khallikān, III, 69, has "secretary.")
- Kitāb tafdhīl al-Sinān (كتاب تفضيل السنان) ‘Superiority of the Aged,’ written for ‘Alī ibn al-Furāt (855 – 924) surnamed Abū al-Ḥasan; (Note: Omitted in Beatty and Tonk MSS of Al-Fihrist.)
- Kitāb al-Shāb (كتاب الشاب) Youths; (Note: Omitted in Flügel edition.)
- Kitāb al-Anwā’ (كتاب الانواع) Varieties (unfinished);
- Kitāb suwāl wa-jawāb Ramaḍān li Ibn al-Munajjim (كتاب سوال وجواب رمضان لابى النجم) Questions about Answers of Ramaḍān of Ibn al-Munajjim; (Note: Uncertain which ‘Ibn’ of the Munajjim family.)
- Kitāb Ramaḍān (كتاب رمضان) Ramaḍān; (Note: Beatty MS of Al-Fihrist suggests "Ramaḍān" erroneously duplicated.)
- Kitāb al-Shāmal fī ‘Alam al-Qur’ān (كتاب الشامل فى علم القران) The Compendium, about knowledge of the Qur’ān (unfinished), (Note: Al-Fihrist adds that it contained rare forms for the scholars (وللعلمآء في ذلك نوادر ليس هذا موضعها).)
- Kitāb Munāqub ‘alā ibn al-Furāt (كتاب مناقب على بن الفرات) The Virtues of ‘Alī ibn Muḥammad ibn al-Furāt;
- Kitāb akhbār Abū Tammām (كتاب اخبار ابى تمام) Traditions about Abū Tammām;
- Kitāb akhbār al-Jubbā’ī Abū Sa’īd (كتاب اخبار الجُبّاءى ابى سعيد) Traditions about al-Jubbā’ī Abū Sa’īd;
- Kitāb al-‘Abbās ibn Aḥnaf (كتاب العباس بن الاحنف ومختار شعره) Al-‘Abbās ibn Aḥnaf and selected poems;
- Epistle of Al-‘Abbās ibn Aḥnaf about collecting taxes; (Note: Omitted in Flügel.)
- Kitāb akhbār Abā ‘Amru Ibn al-‘Alā’ (كتاب اخبار ابآ عمرو ابن العلاء) Traditions about Abū ‘Amr ibn al-‘Alā’;
- Kitāb Al-Gharar (كتاب الغرر امالى) Al-Gharar (Note: Al-gharar, "peril," may be a poet’s nickname. Yāqūt, Irshād, VI (7), 137, gives a separate title. Flügel gives the word but doubts its accuracy. Omitted in Beatty and Tonk MSS.)

== Dīwāns of Contemporary Poets edited by al-Ṣūlī (Note: Compiled alphabetically by al-Ṣūlī) ==
- Muḥammad ibn Aḥmad al-Ṣanawbarī (Note: Muḥammad ibn Aḥmad al-Ṣanawbarī surnamed Abū Bakr, poet of Antioch of the Abbāsid Period. Al-Ṣūlī edited and alphabetically arranged (two hundred leaves of) of his poetry.)
- Ibn al-Rūmī (ابن الرومى); Ibn al-Rūmī Alī ibn al-Abbās grandson of George the Greek popular poet of Baghdād.
- Abū Tammām (ابو تمام);
- al-Buḥturī (البحترى);
- Abū Nuwās (ابو نؤاس);
- Al-‘Abbās ibn al-Aḥnaf (العباس بن الاحنف);
- ‘Alī ibn al-Jahm (على بن الجهم);
- Ibn Ṭabāṭabā (ابن طباطبا);
- Ibrāhīm ibn al-‘Abbās al-Ṣūlī (ابرهيم بن العباس الصولى);
- Sufyān ibn ‘Uyaynah (سفيان ابن عيينة);
- Sawwār ibn Abī Sharā‘ah (ابن شراعة); (Note: Flügel repeats Ibn al-Rūmī and misplaces al-Ṣūlī in the third-to-last name. Only Flügel gives Sufyān ibn ‘Uyaynah and Sawwār ibn Abī Sharā‘ah.)

== Legacy ==
Others who made use of content from al-Ṣūlī’s works:

- Al-Marzubānī, his principal student who adopted his compilation technique, and frequently cites him in his Kitāb al-Muwashshaḥ.
- Abū al-Faraj al-Iṣbahānī in his Kitāb al-Aghānī
- Al-Mas'ūdī
- Hilāl al-Ṣābī
- Arīb ibn Sa’d al-Qurṭubī
- Abū Hilāl al-‘Askarī
- Miskawaihī
- ‘Alī ibn Ẓāfir al-Azdī
- Ibn Ṭiqṭaqā
- Al-Suyūṭī

== See also ==
- List of Muslim historians

== Bibliography ==
- Robert Charles Bell (1980). Board and Table Games from Many Civilizations. ISBN 0-486-23855-5.
- Flügel, Gustav (1862). Die Grammatischen Schulen der Araber (in German). Leipzig: Brockhaus. p. 162.
- Khallikān (Ibn), Aḥmad ibn Muḥammad (1868). Wafayāt al-A'yān wa-Anbā' Abnā' al-Zamān (The Obituaries of Eminent Men). Vol. III. Translated by McGuckin de Slane, William. Paris: Oriental Translation Fund of Great Britain and Ireland. pp. 68–73.
- Kratchkovsky, Ignatius, "Al-Ṣūlī, Abū Bakr Muḥammad ibn Yaḥyā ibn al-'Abbās", Encyclopaedia of Islam
- Leder, S. "al-Suli, Abu Bakr Muhammad." Encyclopaedia of Islam, Second Edition. Edited by: P. Bearman, Th. Bianquis, C.E. Bosworth, E. van Donzel and W.P. Heinrichs. Brill, 2008. Brill Online.
- Mas'ūdī (al-), Abū al-Ḥasan ‘Alī ibn al-Ḥusayn (1869). Kitāb Murūj al-Dhahab wa-Ma'ād in al-Jawhar (Les Prairies d'or) (in Arabic and French). Vol. V. Translated by Meynard, C. Barbier; Courteille, Pavet. Paris: Imprimerie impériale. p. 148.
- Mas'ūdī (al-), Abū al-Ḥasan ‘Alī ibn al-Ḥusayn (1861). Kitāb Murūj al-Dhahab wa-Ma'ād in al-Jawhar (Les Prairies d'or) (in Arabic and French). Vol. I. Translated by Meynard, C. Barbier; Courteille, Pavet. Paris: Imprimerie impériale. p. 161.
- Murray, H. J. R. (1913). A History of Chess. ISBN 0-936317-01-9.
- Nadīm (al-), Abū al-Faraj Muḥammad ibn Isḥāq Abū Ya’qūb al-Warrāq (1970). Dodge, Bayard (ed.). The Fihrist of al-Nadim; a tenth-century survey of Muslim culture. New York & London: Columbia University Press.
- Nadīm (al-), Abū al-Faraj Muḥammad ibn Isḥāq (1872). Flügel, Gustav (ed.). Kitāb al-Fihrist (in Arabic). Leipzig: F.C.W. Vogel. p. 572 (150).
- Ṣūlī (al-), Abū Bakr Muḥammad b. Yaḥyā (1934). Heyworth-Dunne, J (ed.). Kitāb al-Awrāķ (Section on Contemporary Poets) (in Arabic). London: Luzac.
- Ṣūlī (al-), Abū Bakr Muḥammad b. Yaḥyā (1935). Heyworth-Dunne, J (ed.). Akhbār ar-Rāḍī wa-al-Muttaķī from the Kitāb al-Awrāķ (in Arabic). London: Luzac.
- Ṣūlī (al-), Abū Bakr Muḥammad b. Yaḥyā (1936). Heyworth-Dunne, J (ed.). Ash'ār Awlād al-Khulafā' wa-Akhbāruhum from the Kitāb al-Awrāķ (in Arabic). London: Luzac.
- al-Ziriklī, Khayr al-Dīn (2007). al-Aʻlām, qāmūs tarājim li-ashhar al-rijāl wa-al-nisāʼ min al-ʻArab wa-al-mustaʻribīn wa-al-mustashriqīn (in Arabic). Vol. VII (17 ed.). Bayrūt: Dār al-ʻIlm lil-Malāyīn. p. 149.
- Yāqūt, Shihāb al-Dīn ibn ‘Abd al-Ḥamawī (1993). Irshād al-Arīb alā Ma'rifat al-Adīb (in Arabic).
- Yāqūt, Shihāb al-Dīn ibn ‘Abd al-Ḥamawī (1913). Margoliouth, D. S. (ed.). Irshād al-Arīb alā Ma'rifat al-Adīb (in Arabic). Vol. VI (7). Leiden: Brill. p. 137.
- Yāqūt, Shihāb al-Dīn ibn ‘Abd al-Ḥamawī (1907). Margoliouth, D. S. (ed.). Irshād al-Arīb alā Ma'rifat al-Adīb (in Arabic). Lieden: Brill.
