= Al-Mada'ini =

Iranian historian writing in Arabic (752/753–843)

Abu al-Hasan Ali ibn Muhammad ibn Abd Allah ibn Abi Sayf al-Qurashi
- أَبُو الْحَسَن عَلِيّ بْن مُحَمَّد بْن عَبْد اللَّه بْن أَبِي سَيْف الْقُرَشِيّ
- Born: 752/753; Basra, Abbasid Caliphate
- Died: 843; Baghdad, Abbasid Caliphate
- Occupations: Historian, Scholar

Academic work
- Era: Islamic Golden Age
- Main interests: History, Genealogy, Geography, Arabic literature, Poetry
- Notable works: Over 200 works, including historical accounts of the Islamic world
- Notable ideas: Detailed historical accounts from pre-Islamic times to the Abbasid era

Abu al-Hasan Ali ibn Muhammad ibn Abd Allah ibn Abi Sayf al-Qurashi (Arabic: أَبُو الْحَسَن عَلِيّ بْن مُحَمَّد بْن عَبْد اللَّه بْن أَبِي سَيْف الْقُرَشِيّ, romanized: Abū al-Ḥasan ʿAlī ibn Muḥammad ibn ʿAbd Allāh ibn Abī Sayf al-Qurashī; 752/753–843), commonly known by his nisba al-Mada'ini (Arabic: المَدَائِنيّ, romanized: al-Madāʾinī), was a scholar of Iranian descent who wrote in Arabic and was active under the early Abbasids in Iraq in the first half of the 9th century. A scholar of many interests, he wrote over 200 works, but is best known as a historian.

== Life ==
Little is known about al-Mada'ini's life. The second edition of the Encyclopaedia of Islam notes that according to his own account, he was born in 752. However the third edition of the Encyclopaedia of Islam notes that according to other sources (citing al-Marzubani), he was born in 752/753, which can be treated as "his approximate year of birth". Al-Mada'ini and his family were of Iranian descent, and, according to sources attributed to him, he knew Persian. He was most likely born in Basra, and for most of his life remained in various cities in Iraq.

Al-Mada'ini and his family were clients (mawlas) of Abd al-Rahman ibn Samura al-Qurashi (died 670/1), a companion of Muhammad and a commander of the early Muslim armies who battled in the regions of Sijistan, Khurasan, Kabul, and Zabulistan. In 770 he was in Basra, but later went to al-Mada'in and Baghdad, where he spent most of his life. The origin of his [[nisba (onomastics)|nisba]], "al-Mada'ini", by which he is known, is unclear: it may derive from his stay in al-Mada'in, or have pre-dated it. Due to associations with Abd al-Rahman ibn Samura, he was given the second nisba of "al-Qurashi".

Al-Mada'ini may also have spent time in Kufa, since he recounts many Kufans among his sources. In Baghdad, he was a pupil of the Mu'tazili scholar Mu'ammar ibn Abbad al-Sulami (died 830), and came under the patronage of the musician Ishaq ibn Ibrahim al-Mawsili (died 850), with whom he also formed a close and lasting friendship—it is said that he died in al-Mawsili's house. The sources differ on the date of his death, variously giving the years 830, 839, 840 and 843. However, as al-Mada'ini's work encompassed the reign of al-Mu'tasim (r. 833–842), and as he is recorded as being over 90 years old at his death, 843 is the most probable date.

== Work ==
Al-Mada'ini was "a highly productive scholar with many-sided interests", producing over 200 works over his career, including such diverse fields like zoology, geography, Arabic literature and poetry. Most of his writings however focus on historical subjects, dealing with the history of the Islamic world from the pre-Islamic times to his own day. His historical works likewise encompassed diverse aspects, such as the genealogy of Muhammad and the Quraysh, geographical studies, the lives of poets and singers, alongside more conventional history of the life of Muhammad, the Muslim conquests, and the Rashidun, Umayyad and Abbasid caliphs. Among Muslim scholars, al-Mada'ini was especially prized as a reliable source on the transmission (akhbar) of the hadith, particularly from the eastern parts of the Islamic world, Khurasan and India.

As a historian, al-Mada'ini's method was that of a collector, rather than commentator, of history; indeed his historical work method resembles the method of a hadith scholar (muhaddith). From his sources he chose the parts that he deemed suitable and composed his work, often providing a reference to the chain of transmission (isnad) of the account from the eyewitness to al-Mada'ini's source. Unlike other historians, al-Mada'ini contented himself with merely reproducing the accounts of events, and never added any commentary of his own. Al-Mada'ini had access and recourse to a broader group of sources than his predecessors and contemporaries, but the core group of scholars on whose work he chiefly relied is limited. His own work was later transmitted by another generation of historians, including men like Ahmad ibn al-Harith al-Kharraz al-Kufi, who reportedly heard the recitation of all of al-Mada'ini's works, his pupil Abu Bakr Ahmad ibn Abi Khaythama, al-Harith ibn Abi Usama, al-Baladhuri, Umar ibn Shabba, Khalifa ibn Khayyat and Ishaq ibn Ibrahim al-Mawsili. The passages taken from al-Mada'ini over the same subject often differ from each other; aside from alterations by later authors or copyists, these discrepancies are attributable to having been drawn from works written at different times in al-Mada'ini's life and with different focus, from monographs to compendia.

== Sources ==
- Lindstedt, Ilkka (2021). "al-Madāʾinī". In Fleet, Kate; Krämer, Gudrun; Matringe, Denis; Nawas, John; Rowson, Everett (eds.). Encyclopaedia of Islam (3rd ed.). Brill Online. ISSN 1873-9830.
- Sezgin, Ursula (1986). "al-Madāʾinī". In Bosworth, C. E.; van Donzel, E.; Lewis, B. & Pellat, Ch. (eds.). The Encyclopaedia of Islam, Second Edition. Volume V: Khe–Mahi. Leiden: E. J. Brill. pp. 946–948. doi:10.1163/1573-3912_islam_COM_0600. ISBN 978-90-04-07819-2.
