= Divan-i Shams-i Tabrizi =

Large collection of poems by Rumi

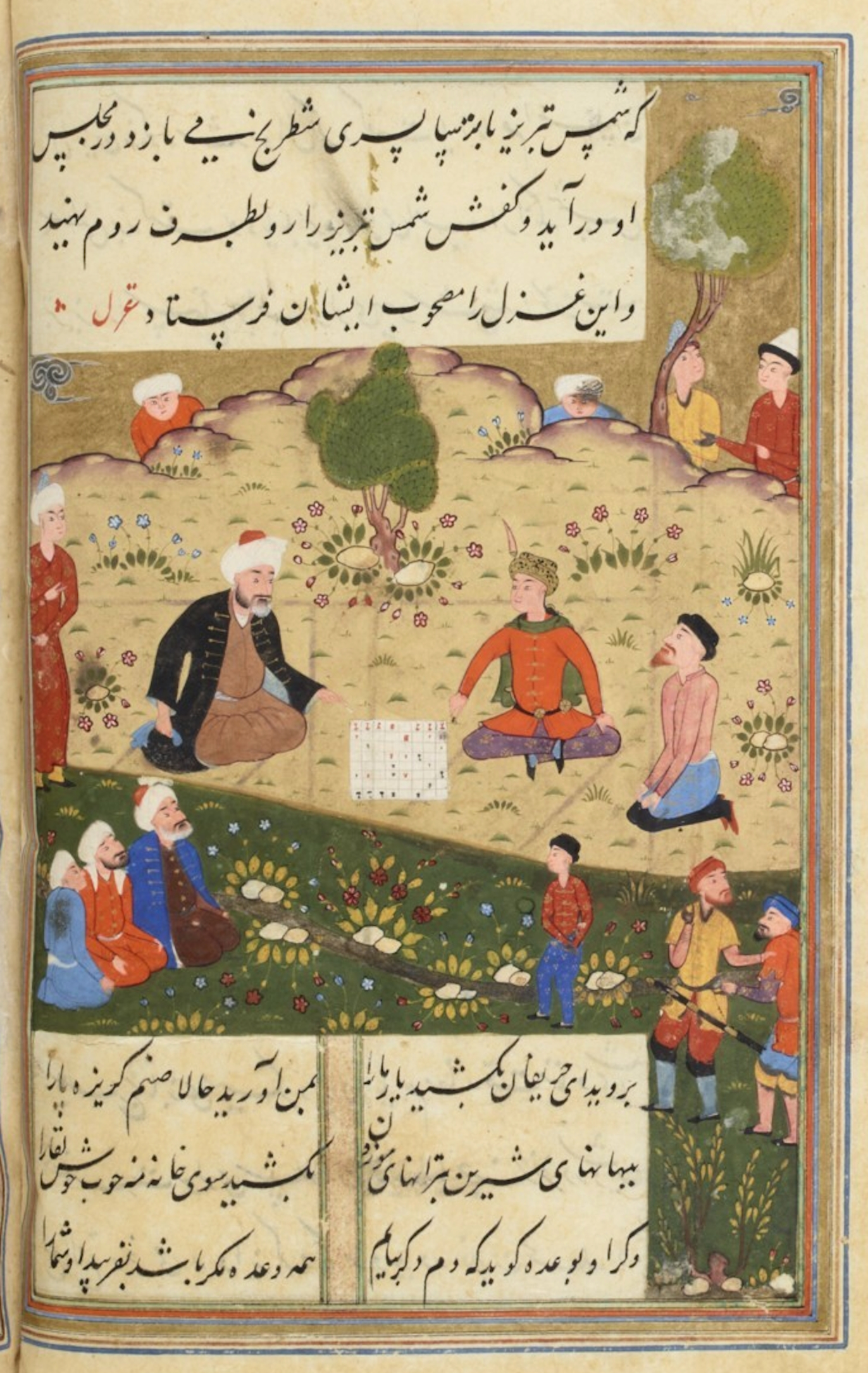
A page of a copy circa 1503 of the Divan-i Shams-i Tabrizi. For details, see: Rumi ghazal 163.

Divan-i Kabir (Persian: دیوان کبیر), also known as Divan-i Shams (دیوان شمس) and Divan-i Shams-i Tabrizi (دیوان شمس تبریزی), is a collection of poems written by the Persian poet and Sufi mystic Rumi. A compilation of lyric poems written in the Persian language, it contains more than 40,000 verses and over 3,000 ghazals. While following the long tradition of Sufi poetry as well as the traditional metrical conventions of ghazals, the poems in the Divan showcase Rumi’s unique, trance-like poetic style. Written in the aftermath of the disappearance of Rumi’s beloved spiritual teacher, Shams-i Tabrizi, the Divan is dedicated to Shams and contains many verses praising him and lamenting his disappearance. Although not a didactic work, the Divan still explores deep philosophical themes, particularly those of love and longing.

== Content ==
The Divan contains poems in several different Eastern-Islamic poetic styles (e.g. ghazals, elegies, quatrains, etc.). It contains 44,292 lines (according to Foruzanfar's edition, which is based on the oldest manuscripts available); 3,229 ghazals in fifty-five different metres (34,662); 44 tarji-bands (1,698 lines); and 1,983 quatrains (7,932 lines). Although most of the poems are written in Persian, there are also some in Arabic, as well as some bilingual poems written in Turkish, Arabic, and Greek.

== Form and style ==
Most of the poems in the Divan follow the form of a ghazal, a type of lyric poem often used to express themes of love and friendship as well as more mystical Sufi theological subjects. By convention, poets writing ghazals often adopted poetic personas which they then invoked as pen names at the end of their poems, in what are called takhallos. Rumi signed off most of his own ghazals as either Khâmush (Silence) or Shams-i Tabrizi.

Although he had belonged to a long tradition of Sufi poetry, Rumi developed his own unique style. Notably, due to the extemporaneous manner in which Rumi composed his poems, much of Rumi’s poetry has an ecstatic, almost trance-like style that differs from the works of other professional Islamic poets. Rumi evidently found the traditional metrical constraints of ghazals to be constraining, lamenting in one ghazal that fitting his poems into the traditional “dum-ta-ta-dum” ghazal metre was a process so dreadful that it nearly killed him.

== Origins and history ==
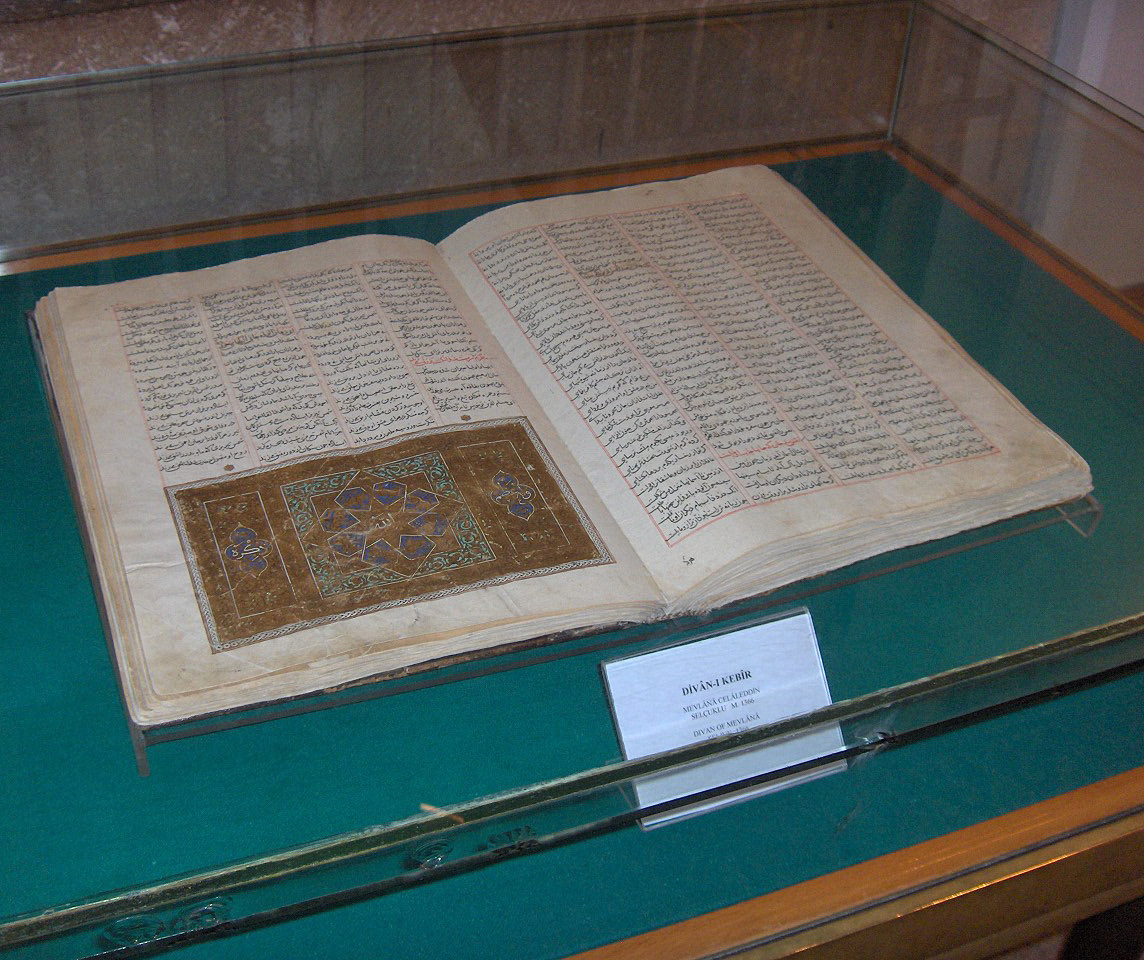
Pages from a 1366 manuscript of the Divan-i Shams-i Tabrizi in the Mevlâna mausoleum, Konya, Turkey

In 1244 C.E, Rumi, then a jurist and spiritual counselor working at the behest of the Seljuk Sultan of Rûm, met a wandering Persian Sufi dervish named Shams-i Tabrizi in Konya. Rumi, who previously had no background in poetics, quickly became attached to Shams, who acted as a spiritual teacher to Rumi and introduced him to music, sung poetry, and dance through Sufi samas. Shams abruptly left Konya in 1246 C.E, returned a year later, then vanished again in 1248 C.E, possibly having been murdered. During Shams’ initial separation from Rumi, Rumi wrote poetic letters to Shams pleading for his return. Following Shams’ second disappearance, Rumi returned to writing poetry lauding Shams and lamenting his disappearance. These poems would be collected after Rumi’s death by his students as the Divan-i Shams-i Tabrizi.

The creation dates of some of the poems in the Divan are unknown. However, a major portion of the Divan’s poems were written in the initial aftermath of Sham’s second disappearance. Therefore, most of the poems probably date from around 1247 C.E. and the years that followed until Rumi had overcome his grief over the loss of Shams. Another seventy poems in the Divan were written after Rumi had confirmed that Shams was dead. Rumi dedicated these poems to his friend Salah al-Din Zarkub, who died in December 1258.

By the sixteenth century, most editors organized the poems in the Divan by alphabetical order according to the last letter of each line, disregarding the varying meters and topics of the poems. This method for arranging lyrical poems in the Divan is still used in modern Iranian editions of the Divan. Turkish editions, however, follow the practice of the Mevlevi Order and group the poems by metre.

The first printed copy of the Divan was made in Europe in 1838 by Vincenz von Rosenzweig-Schwannau, who printed seventy-five poems of dubious authenticity. Reynold A. Nicholson produced a more selective text of fifty ghazals from the Divan, although Badi al-Zaman Foruzanfar’s critical edition has since determined several of Nicholson’s selections to have been inauthentic. In 1957, Foruzanfar published a critical collection of the Divan’s poems based upon manuscripts written within a hundred years of Rumi’s death.

== Themes ==
Although the Divan is, in contrast to Rumi's Masnavi, not a didactic work, it is still a deeply philosophical work, expressing Rumi’s mystical Sufi theology. Among the more prominent themes in the Divan are those of love and longing.

Some Rumi scholars such as Rokus de Groot argue that Rumi rejects longing in favour of a divine unity, or tawhid, a concept which de Groot considers to originate in the Shahada's declaration that there is no other god save God. According to de Groot, Rumi holds that longing, being a lust to grasp something beyond oneself, necessarily creates a duality between subjects and objects. Thus, those drunk with love, as Rumi writes, are double, whereas those drunk with god are united as one.

De Groot maintains that Rumi’s philosophy of the oneness of love explains why Rumi signed about a third of the Divan under Shams-i Tabrizi’s name; By writing as if he and Shams were the same person, Rumi repudiated the longing that plagued him after Shams’ disappearance in favour of the unity of all beings found in divine love.

In contrast, Mostafa Vaziri argues for a non-Islamic interpretation of Rumi. In Vaziri’s view, Rumi’s references to love compose a separate Mazhab-e ‘Ishq, or “Religion of Love,” which was universalist rather than uniquely Islamic in outlook. Vaziri posits that Rumi’s notion of love was a designation for the incorporeal reality of existence that lies outside of physical conception. Thus, according to Vaziri, Rumi’s references to Shams in the Divan refer not to the person of Shams but to the all-encompassing universality of the love-reality.

== Legacy ==
The Divan has influenced several poets and writers. American Transcendentalists such as Ralph Waldo Emerson and Walt Whitman were acquainted with the Divan, and were inspired by its philosophical mysticism. Many late Victorian and Georgian poets in England were also acquainted with Rumi from Nicholson’s translation of the Divan. Prominent Rumi interpreter Coleman Barks has used selections from Nevit Ergin’s translation of the Divan in his own reinterpretations of Rumi, albeit with controversy as to the accuracy and authenticity of Barks’ interpretation. Publication of a twenty-volume English translation from the original Persian by Jeffrey R. Osborne was completed in 2020.
