= Al-Marzubani =

Arab author and historian (c. 909-994)

Abū 'Abd Allāh Muḥammad ibn 'Imrān al-Marzubānī
- أبو عبد الله محمد عمران المرزباني الخراساني
- Born: February-March 909 (Jumāda 296/7 AH); Baghdād, al-Irāq
- Died: 10 November 994 (aged 85) [2 Shawwāl 384 A.H.] Baghdād, al-Irāq
- Other name: Abū 'Abd Allāh Muḥammad 'Imrān ibn Mūsā ibn Sa'īd ibn 'Abd Allāh al-Marzubānī (أبو عبد الله محمد عمران بن موسى بن سعيد بن عبد الله)

Academic background
- Influences: Abd Allāh ibn Muḥammad al-Baghawī, Abū Dā'ūd al-Sijistānī

Academic work
- Era: Islamic Golden Age (Middle and Later Abbasid era)
- Influenced: Ibn al-Murtaḍā

Abū 'Abd Allāh Muḥammad ibn 'Imrān ibn Mūsā ibn Sa'īd ibn 'Abd Allāh al-Marzubānī al-Khurāsānī (Note: 'Abd Allāh or 'Ubayd Allāh) (Arabic: أبو عبد الله محمد بن عمران بن موسى المرزباني الخراساني) (c. 909 – 10 November 994), (Note: Authorities vary on the year of his death: Flügel Al-Fihrist —988/89; Yāqūt, Irshād, VI (7), 50—either 988/89 or 994; the Beatty MS of Al-Fihrist, Khallikān (Ibn) 1843, III, 67 and Baghdādī (al-) 2001, Ta'rīkh, §1426, 227-9— 994) was a prolific author of adab, akhbar (news), history and ḥadīth (traditions). He lived all his life in his native city, Baghdad, although his family came originally from Khurāsān.

== Life ==
Al-Marzubānī came from a wealthy Arab family connected to the royal court of the Abbāsid caliph. Ibn al-Jawālīqī in his Kitāb al-Mu'arrab, explains that al-Marzubānī inherited a Persian epithet "Marzban", which means 'Guardian of the frontier'. The Buyid amir ‘Aḍūd al-Dawla was known to visit his residence on the east bank of the Tigris, where he would also entertain members of a literary circle dedicated to the conservation and transmission of Arabic philological literature. Fellow authors in his circle were Abū Ya'qūb al-Najīramī (d.1031), Abū Sa'īd al-Sīrāfī (d. 979) and Abū Bakr Muḥammad ibn 'Abd al-Malik al-Tārīkhī. He edited the first dīwān (collected poems) by the Umayyad caliph Muawiyah I (r. 661–680), which he produced in a small volume of about three kurrāsa, (Note: A kurrāsa, or quire, typically has twenty pages.) – ca., 60 ff.

=== Al-Marzubānī's principal teachers ===
- 'Abd Allāh ibn Muḥammad al-Baghawī (Note: 'Abd Allāh ibn Muḥammad ibn 'Abd Allāh al-'Azīz al-Baghawī Abū al-Qāsim, kunya Ibn Bint Munī'.) (829 – 929), jurist.
- Abū Bakr ibn Abī Dā'ūd al-Sijistānī (ca. 844—928/929), ḥāfiẓ, scholar of Ḥadīth and Qur'an, and author of Kitāb al-Masābīh.
- al-Ṣūlī held al-Marzubānī in high esteem and much of al-Marzubānī's material in his Kitāb al-Muwashshaḥ and his compilation technique was apparently borrowed from him.

=== Al-Marzubānī's principal authorities ===
- Abū Bakr ibn Durayd (837 -934), a great grammarian of Basra.
- Abū Bakr Muḥammad ibn al-Qāsim ibn al-Anbārī (855 – 940) was a famous pupil of Tha'lab.

Abū Bakr al-Khwārizmī led the funeral service. He was buried in his house on Shari Amr al-Rūmī (Amr the Greek Street), on the eastern quarter of Baghdād.

== Legacy ==
He was the last of the authorities of literary and oral tradition Isḥāq al-Nadīm met. He was cited by the Mu'tazilite theologian Abū 'Abd Allāh al-Ṣaymarī (d. 927/8), Abū al-Qāsim al-Tanūkhi (940 – 994), Abū Muḥammad al-Jauhari, et al. Some sectarian-based criticism – attributed to al-Marzubānī's religious leanings and madhhab, despite his publication of Ḥanafī, Shī'i and Mu'tazila riwāya and akhbar (biographies). – seems to have led to the relative neglect of his writings by Sunni scholars in later centuries.

== Works ==
Among his books were: (Note: Titles sequence and number of ff given for each book differ considerably in the Beatty MS and Flügel edition of Al-Nadīm's Al-Fihrist.)

- Al–Mu'niq (كتاب المونق) 'Pleasing'; accounts of famous pre–Islamic poets, from Imru' al-Qays and members of his category, with a thorough investigation of their traditions; to poets from the pre-to-early-Islāmic period, and the Muslims following them and their generations; early Muslims and their best traditions about Jarīr ibn 'Aṭīyah, al-Farazdaq and their cohort before the 'Abbāsid era; Ibn Harmah (Note: Ibn Harmah Abū Isḥāq Ibrāhīm ibn 'Alī.) (685 – 767) and al-Ḥusayn ibn Muṭayr al-Asadī (d. 767), and poets; over 5000 ff.
- Al–Mustanīr 'Illuminating'; anthology of famous modern poets and selected poetry according to age and period; From Bashshār ibn Burd, to Abū al-'Abbās 'Abd Allāh ibn al-Mu'tazz bi-Allāh. —6000 ff; in an autograph by al-Marzubānī in sixty Sulaymānīyah volumes. (Note: Sulaymānīyah; here probably a kind of paper. Each leather-bound mujallad (volume) contained 100 ff.)
- Al-Mufīd (كتاب المفيد) 'Profitable'; §1—late-pre-early-Islāmic poets with paternal or maternal surnames, genealogies, patrons, affiliations etc.; §2—references to physical characteristics of poets; §3—religious ideologies and practices of poets; §4—those who spurned pre-Islāmic poetry in favour of Islām and religious piety; or satire for eulogy (Note: MS is unclear. Perhaps al-madīḥ ("eulogy") or al-mudabbaj ('indecent').); or love poetry for virtuosity; and those dedicated to a single poetic subject, such as Sayyid ibn Muḥammad al-Ḥimyarī and al-'Abbās ibn al-Aḥnaf, et al. 5000 ff.
- Al-Mu'jam (كتاب المعجم) 'The Alphabetical Book'; (Note: Al-Mu'jam here clearly means "alphabetical." In his life of al-Khowarizmi Khallikān mentions a title Mu'jam al-Shu'arā by al-Marzubānī.) a dictionary of ca., 5000 poets and selected verses, and best known stanzas; over 1000 ff.
- Al-Muwashshaḥ (كتاب الموشّح) 'The Acrostic', literary criticism of poetry by the authorities (al-'ulamā'), such as use, and inconsistent use, of vowel signs, mispronunciations, final syllable repetition in a verse, irregular rhyming, changes, ambiguity, loose weaving of the composition, and other errors in poetry; over 300 ff.
- Al-Shi'r (كتاب الشعر) 'Poetry' (Note: Translated from the Beatty MS of Al-Fihrist.) a compendium of descriptions of qualities, benefits, defects; kinds, forms, measures, prosody, essential characteristics, selections; compositional and recitational poetic training, plagiarism – detection, varieties and forms. Over 2000 ff.
- Ash'ār al-Nisā (كتاب اشعار النساء) 'Poems of Women'; ca. 500 ff.
- Kitab Ash'ār al-Khulafā (كتاب اشعار الخلفآء) 'Poems of the Caliphs'; over 200 ff.
- Al-Muqtabas (كتاب المقتبس) 'Things Quoted', traditions of the grammarians of al-Baṣrah, the first grammarian and author of a book on grammar; traditions about al-Farrā' and the scholars of al-Baṣrah and of al-Kūfah, the quoters (transmitters), and residents of the 'City of Peace' (Baghdād); ca., 3000 ff.
- Al-Murshid (كتاب المرشد) 'Guide to the Right Way'; traditions of al-mutakallimūn and the People of Justice and Oneness ('Mu'tazilah'), their assemblies and doctrines; ca 1000 ff.
- Ash'ār al-Jinn (كتاب اشعار الجن) 'Poems Attributed to the Jinn'; ca. 100 ff.
- Al-Riyāḍ (كتاب الرياض) 'Gardens'; accounts of obsessed people arranged by category; passionate love and its effects, its start and end; terminology and varieties recorded by the philologists; derivations of the terms, with examples from poems by pre-Islāmic poets and by converts to Islām, Muslim and contemporary poets; over 3000 ff.
- Al-Wāthiq (كتاب الواثق) 'The Clear'; (Note: The Flügel edition of Al-Fihrist gives the title Kitāb al-Wāthiq, but Beatty MS gives Kitāb al-Rā'iq, and omits part of the following paragraph.) characteristics, qualities, forms, and methods of song; traditions on freeborn, handmaid, and male and female slave singers; over 1600 ff.
- Al-Azminah (كتاب الازمنة) 'The Seasons'; characteristics of the four seasons; heat and cold; clouds and lightning, wind and rain, al-rawwād ('fresh pasturage'), prayers for rain, spring and autumn; ẓurafā ("beauties") (Note: Dodge, Al-Fihrist, notes that the Flügel edition has ṭarafā, but that ẓurafā seems correct.) of the celestial sphere, the houses of the zodiac, the sun, and the moon with its stations; astrological descriptions and poems of Arabs; planets and the fixed stars, day and night, Arab and Persian days, months and years; periods and eras, language connections to sections of this book, historical traditions, poems, explanations; ca., 2000 ff.
- Al-Anwār wa-al-Thimār (كتاب الانوهر والثمار) 'Flowers and Fruits'. References in poetry, records and traditions, to the rose, the narcissus, and other flowers; praise in poetry and prose of certain fruits, palms etc; ca., 500 ff.
- Akhbār al-Barāmakah (كتاب اخبار البرامكة) 'Traditions of the Barmak Family', their rise and downfall in disgrace; ca 500 ff.
- Al-Mufaṣṣal (كتاب المفصل) 'Elocution and Eloquence,' (Note: Or Kitāb al-Mufaḍḍal, or Kitāb al-Mifḍal – 'Distinguished for Excellence'.) Arabic elocution and calligraphy; ca 700 ff.
- Al-Tahānī (كتاب التهانى) 'Congratulations'; ca., 500 ff.
- Al-Taslīm wa-al-Ziyārah (كتاب التسليم والزيارة) 'Submission and Pilgrimage'; 400 ff.
- Al-'Ibādah (كتاب العبادة) 'Worship'; (Note: Or Kitāb al-'Iyādah 'Visiting';) 400 ff.
- Al-Maghāzī (كتاب المغازى) 'Raids'; (Note: Or Kitāb al-Ta'āzī 'Consolations'.) ca., 300 ff.
- Al-Marāthī (كتاب المراثى) 'Elegies'; 500 ff.
- Al-Mu'allā 'The Exalted Book', excellencies of the Qur'ān; 200 ff. (Note: Title omitted in Flügel of Al-Fihrist.)
- Talqīḥ al-'Uqūl (كتاب تلقيح العقول) 'Fertilization of Minds', over 100 sections, on the mind, culture, learning, etc.; over 3000 ff.
- Al-Mushrif (كتاب المشرف) 'The Noble Book', the rule of the Islamic prophet Muḥammad, his culture, his preaching, his companions, the testaments and the rule of the Arabs and Persians; 1500 ff. (Note: Beatty MS and Flügel differ.)
- Akhbār man Tamaththal bi-al-Ash'ār 'Traditions of Poets Who Use Metaphor'; over 100 ff.
- Al-Shabāb wa-al-Shayb (كتاب الشباب والشعيب) 'Youth and Old Age'; 300 ff.
- Al-Mutawwaj (كتاب المتوج) 'Crowned', on justice and ethical living; over 100 ff.
- Al-Madīḥ (كتاب المديح في الولائم والدعوات والشراب) 'Praise, on banquets, invitations, and drink'; (Note: Or Kitāb al- Mudabbaj – 'Brocaded' (Adorned);)
- Al-Farkh (كتاب الفرخ) 'The Young'; (Note: Kitāb al-Faraj, al-Furaj, or al-Farj – 'Relief';) nearly 100 ff.
- Al-Hadāyā (كتاب الهدايا) 'Gifts'; ca., 300 ff. (Note: A second manuscript autograph mentioned in Flügel is omitted in Beatty MS of Al-Fihrist.)
- Al-Muzakhraf (كتاب المزخرف) 'Ornamented'; on the ikhwān (الاخوان) 'Brothers' and aṣḥāb (الاصحاب) 'Companions'; 300 ff.
- Akhbār Abī Muslim al-Khurāsānī, Ṣāḥib al-Da'wah (كتاب اخبار ابى مُسْلم صاحب الدعوة) 'Traditions of Abū Muslim al-Khurāsānī, Giver of the Summons'; (Note: In 750 Abū Muslim led the call to overthrow the Umayyad caliphs which established the 'Abbāsid regime and so was called "Giver of the Summons";) 100 ff.
- Al-Du'ā (كتاب الدعاء) 'Supplication' (Invocation); ca., 200 ff.
- Al-Awā'il (كتاب الاوائل) 'The Ancients'; eras and beliefs of ancient Persians and the People of Justice and Oneness, viz., the Mu'tazilah; ca., 1000 ff.
- Al-Mustaṭraf (كتاب المستطرف) 'The Newly Acquired'; the foolish and unusual; over 300 ff.
- Akhbār al-Awlād wa-al-Zawjāt wa-al-Ahl (كتاب الخبار الاولاد والزوجات والاهل) 'Traditions of Children, Wives, and the Family', with praise and blame; 200 ff.
- Al-Zuhd wa-Akhbār al-Zuhhād 'Renunciation and Traditions of the Ascetics'; over 200 ff.
- Dhamm al-Dunyā (كتاب ذمّ الدنيا) 'Blame of the World'; over 100 ff.
- Al-Munīr (كتاب المنير) 'The Shining'; repentance, good deeds, piety, abstinence from crime etc.; over 300 ff.
- Al-Mawā'iẓ wa-Dhikr al-Mawt 'Warnings and Mention of Death'; (Note: Title omitted Flügel.) over 500 ff.
- Akhbār al-Muḥtaḍarīn (كتاب المحتضرين) 'Traditions about Those Near Death'; 100 ff. (Note: Or Kitāb Akhbār al-Muḥtaḍirīn ('Traditions about Settled People'); title unclear in Beatty MS of Al-Fihrist.)
- Dhamr al-Ḥujjāb (كتاب ذمر الحجاب) 'Chiding the Chamberlain'; (Note: Perhaps al-ḥujjāb 'chamberlains', al-ḥijāb 'curtain', or Kitāb al-Ḥujjāb 'The Chamberlain'.) 100 ff.
- Shi'r Ḥātim al-Ṭa'ī' (كتاب شعر حاتم الطاءى) 'Poetry of Ḥātim al-Ṭa'ī'; ca., 100 ff. (Note: Ḥātim, poet and chief of the Ṭayy Tribe in the late Jahiliyyah era.)
- Akhbār Abū Ḥanīfah al-Nu'mān ibn Thābit (كتاب اخبار ابى حنيفة النعمان بن ثابت) 'Traditions of Abū Ḥanīfah al-Nu'mān ibn Thābit'; (Note: Or Kitāb Abī Ḥanīfah wa-Aṣḥābihi – 'Abū Ḥanīfah and His Associates';) ca., 500 ff.
- Akhbār 'Abd al-Ṣamad ibn al-Mu'adhdhal (كتاب اخبار عبد اصمد بن المْعَدَّل) 'Traditions of 'Abd al-Ṣamad ibn al-Mu'adhdhal'; ca., 200 ff.
- Akhbār Abī 'Abd Allāh (كتاب اخرار ابى عبد الله) 'Traditions of Abū 'Abd Allāh Muḥammad ibn Ḥamzah al-'Alawī; ca., 100 ff.
- Akhbār Mulūk Kindah (كتاب اخرار ملوك كندة) 'Traditions of the Kings of Kindah'; ca., 200 ff.
- Akhbār Abī Tammām (كتاب اخرار ابى تمّام) Traditions of Abū Tammām; ca., 100 ff.
- Akhbār Shu'bah ibn al-Ḥajjāj (كتاب اخبار شعبة بن احجاج) 'Traditions of Shu'bah ibn al-Ḥajjāj'; ca., 100 ff.
- Naskh al-'Uhūd (كتاب نسح العهود الى القضاة) 'Cancellation of Contracts'; addressed to the judges; ca., 200 ff.

=== Books about the Sawād (Note: Sawād usually meant central and southern Irāq but here could mean the people or the environs. These books are omitted in Flügel edition.) ===
- An'ān al-Shi'r – 'Essences of Poetry'; about praise and satire, glory and generosity
- Akhbār al-Ajwād – 'Traditions about the Generous'
- Al-Awṣāf – 'Qualities'
- Al-Tashbihāt – 'Allegories'

Isḥāq al-Nadīm records that 20,000 ff from sources written in al-Marzubānī's handwriting had survived to his day.

== See also ==
- List of Arab scientists and scholars

== Bibliography ==
- Baghdādī (al-), Al-Khaṭīb Abū Bakr Aḥmad ibn 'Alī (2001). Ta'rīkh Madīnat al-Salām (Ta'rīkh Baghdād) (in Arabic). Vol. IV, §1426. Beirut: Dār al-Gharib al-Islāmī. pp. 227–229.
- Brockelmann, Carl (1937). Geschichte der Arabischen Litteratur Supplementband (in German). Vol. I. Leiden: E.J. Brill. pp. 190–1.
- Flügel, Gustav (1862). Die Grammatischen Schulen der Araber (in German). Leipzig: Brockhaus. pp. 204, 244.
- Ḥajar (Ibn), Abū al-Faḍl Aḥmad ibn 'Alī al-Asqalānī. Lisān al-Mīzān. Vol. 5 parts. Hyderabad: Dā'irat al-Ma'ārif al-Niẓāmīyah.
- 'Imād (Ibn al-) (1989). Arnaout, Abdul Qadir; Arnaout, Mahmoud (eds.). Shadharāt al-dhahab fī akhbār man dhahab (in Arabic). Vol. IV. Beirut: Dār Ibn Kathīr. pp. 444–448.
- Iṣbahānī, Abū al-Faraj (1888). Kitab al-Aghānī (in Arabic). Vol. III. Leiden: Brill. pp. 122–176.
- Khallikān (Ibn), Aḥmad ibn Muḥammad (1843). Wafayāt al-A'yān wa-Anbā' Abnā' al-Zamān (The Obituaries of Eminent Men). Vol. I. Translated by McGuckin de Slane, William. Paris: Oriental Translation Fund of Great Britain and Ireland. pp. 377–379.
- Khallikān (Ibn), Aḥmad ibn Muḥammad (1868). Wafayāt al-A'yān wa-Anbā' Abnā' al-Zamān (The Obituaries of Eminent Men). Vol. III. Translated by McGuckin de Slane, William. Paris: Oriental Translation Fund of Great Britain and Ireland. pp. 67–68.
- Khallikān (Ibn), Aḥmad ibn Muḥammad (1871). Wafayāt al-A'yān wa-Anbā' Abnā' al-Zamān (The Obituaries of Eminent Men). Vol. IV. Translated by McGuckin de Slane, William. Paris: Oriental Translation Fund of Great Britain and Ireland. pp. 409–411.
- Mas'ūdī (al-), Abū al-Ḥasan 'Alī ibn al-Ḥusayn (1869). Kitāb Murūj al-Dhahab wa-Ma'ād in al-Jawhar (Les Prairies d'or) (in Arabic and French). Vol. V. Translated by Meynard (de), C. barbier; Courteille (de), Pavet. Paris: Imprimerie impériale. p. 148.
- Mas'ūdī (al-), Abū al-Ḥasan 'Alī ibn al-Ḥusayn (1861). Kitāb Murūj al-Dhahab wa-Ma'ād in al-Jawhar (Les Prairies d'or) (in Arabic and French). Vol. I. Translated by Meynard (de), C. barbier; Courteille (de), Pavet. Paris: Imprimerie impériale. p. 161.
- Mubārak, Zakī (2013). Al-Nathr al-fannī fī al-qarn al-rābiʻ (in Arabic). al-Qāhirah: Dār al-Kātib al-ʻArabī. pp. 473–484.
- Murtaḍā (Ibn al-), Aḥmad ibn Yaḥyā (1961), Diwald-Wilzer, Susanna; Zwettler, Michael (eds.), "Ṭabaqāt al-Mu'tazilah (Die Klassen der Mu'taziliten)", Bibliotheca Islamica, Nasharāt al-Islāmīyah (in Arabic), XXI, Bayrūt: al-Maṭbaʻah al-Kāthūlīkīyah (in kommission bei Frantz Steiner Verlag): 96
- Nadīm (al-), Abū al-Faraj Muḥammad ibn Isḥāq Abū Ya'qūb al-Warrāq (1970). Dodge, Bayard (ed.). The Fihrist of al-Nadim; a tenth-century survey of Muslim culture. New York & London: Columbia University Press.
- Nadīm (al-), Abū al-Faraj Muḥammad ibn Isḥāq (1872). Flügel, Gustav (ed.). Kitāb al-Fihrist (in Arabic). Leipzig: F.C.W. Vogel. p. 572 (150).
- Nawawī (al-), Abū Zakarīyā' Yaḥyā (1847) [1842]. Wüstenfeld, Ferdinand (ed.). Kitāb Tahdhīb al-Asmā' (Biographical Dictionary of Illustrious Men) (in Arabic). Göttingen: London Society for the Publication of the Oriental Texts. p. 708 Arabic.
- Qifṭī (al-), ʻAlī ibn Yūsuf (1986). Abū al-Faḍl Ibrāhīm, Muḥammad (ed.). Inbāh al-ruwāt ʻalá anbāh al-nuḥāt (in Arabic). Vol. III, §682. Beirut: Dār al-Fikr al-'Arabī. p. 180.
- Ṣafadī (aṣ-), Salah al-Dīn (1993), ʻAdnān al-Baḫīt, Muḥammạd (ed.), "Al-Wāfī bi-'l-wafayāt (Preface)", Bibliotheca Islamica (in Arabic), I, Beirut
- Sellheim, R (1991), "Al-Marzubānī", The Encyclopedia of Islam, vol. VI (New ed.), Leiden: E. J. Brill, pp. 634–635
- Sellheim, R. (2023). "al-Marzubānī". In Bearman, P.; Bianquis, Th.; Bosworth, C.E.; van Donzel, E.; Heinrichs, W.P. (eds.). Encyclopaedia of Islam (2nd ed.).
- Ṣūlī (al-), Abū Bakr Muḥammad b. Yaḥyā (1934). Heyworth-Dunne, J (ed.). Kitāb al-Awrāķ (Section on Contemporary Poets) (in Arabic). London: Luzac.
- Ṣūlī (al-), Abū Bakr Muḥammad b. Yaḥyā (1935). Heyworth-Dunne, J (ed.). Akhbār ar-Rāḍī wa-al-Muttaķī from the Kitāb al-Awrāķ (in Arabic). London: Luzac.
- Ṣūlī (al-), Abū Bakr Muḥammad b. Yaḥyā (1936). Heyworth-Dunne, J (ed.). Ash'ār Awlād al-Khulafā' wa-Akhbāruhum from the Kitāb al-Awrāķ (in Arabic). London: Luzac.
- Suyūṭī (al-), Jalāl al-Dīn 'Abd al-Raḥmān (1965). Bughyat al-Wuʻāh fī Ṭabaqāt al-Lughawīyīn wa-al-Nuḥāh (in Arabic). Vol. 1. al-Qāhirah: Ṭubiʻa bi-mạṭbaʻat ʻĪsa al-Bābī al-Halabī. pp. 507–508.
- Yāqūt, Shihāb al-Dīn ibn 'Abd al-Ḥamawī (1993). "1092". In Abbās, Ihsan (ed.). Irshād al-Arīb alā Ma'rifat al-Adīb (in Arabic). Beirut: Dār Gharib al-Islām i. p. 2582.
- Yāqūt, Shihāb al-Dīn ibn 'Abd al-Ḥamawī (1913). Margoliouth, D. S. (ed.). Irshād al-Arīb alā Ma'rifat al-Adīb (in Arabic). Vol. VI (7). Leiden: Brill. p. 137.
- Yāqūt, Shihāb al-Dīn ibn 'Abd al-Ḥamawī (1907). Margoliouth, D. S. (ed.). Irshād al-Arīb alā Ma'rifat al-Adīb (in Arabic). Lieden: Brill.
- Yāqūt, Shihāb al-Dīn ibn 'Abd al-Ḥamawī (1869). Wüstenfeld, Ferdinand (ed.). Mu'jam Buldān (Jacut's Geographisches Wörterbuch) (in Arabic). Vol. I. Leipzig: Brockhaus. p. 148, l. 23.
- Yāqūt, Shihāb al-Dīn ibn 'Abd al-Ḥamawī (1866). Wüstenfeld, Ferdinand (ed.). Mu'jam Buldān (Jacut's Geographisches Wörterbuch) (in Arabic). Vol. IV. Leipzig: Brockhaus. p. 764, l. 17.
- Ziriklī (al-), Khayr al-Dīn (2007). al-Aʻlām, qāmūs tarājim li-ashhar al-rijāl wa-al-nisāʼ min al-ʻArab wa-al-mustaʻribīn wa-al-mustashriqīn (in Arabic). Vol. VII (17 ed.). Bayrūt: Dār al-ʻIlm lil-Malāyīn. p. 202.
- Zubaydī (al-), Abū Bakr Muḥammad ibn al-Ḥasan (2009). Ṭabaqāt al-Naḥwīyīn wa-al-Lughawīyīn (in Arabic) (2nd ed.). Cairo: Dār al-Maʻrifah. pp. 106–107.
