= Al-Adli =

9th-century Anatolian Shatranj player

Al-Adli al-Rumi (Arabic: العدلي الرومي; 800–870), was an Arab player and theoretician of Shatranj, an ancient form of chess from Persia. Originally from Anatolia, he authored one of the first treatises on Shatranj in 842, called Kitab ash-shatranj ('Book of Chess').

He was recognized as the best Shatranj player in the 9th century during the reign of al-Wathiq until his loss to al-Razi, just before or early into the reign of al-Mutawakkil.

In his treatise al-Adli compiled the ideas of his predecessors on Shatranj. The book was lost but the problems he discussed survived in the works of successors. Mansūbāt were end game scenarios, where victory was obtained either by checkmate or stalemate, or by baring the opposing king.

From his work came a variant of the Dilaram problem, attributed to al-Suli and called Dilaram checkmate. In a manuscript from the early 15th century, a similar problem was accompanied by the story of a figure named Dilaram, who was the favourite slave of a certain chess player reduced to a desperate position in a match.

== Bibliography ==
- Giffard, Nicolas; Biénabe, Alain (2009). Le Nouveau Guide des échecs. Traité complet (in French). Robert Laffont, coll. «Bouquins». p. 1710. ISBN 978-2-221-11013-3.
- Le Lionnais, François; Maget, Ernst (1967). Dictionnaire des échecs (in French). Paris: Presses universitaires de France. p. 432.
- Hooper, David; Whyld, Ken (1992). The Oxford Companion To Chess. Oxford University Press. ISBN 0-19-866164-9.
- Murray, H. J. R. (1913). A History of Chess. Oxford University Press. p. 879. ISBN 0-19-827403-3.
