= Ignaty Krachkovsky =

Russian and Soviet Arabist (1883–1951)

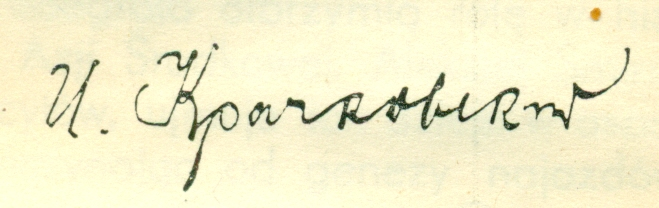
Krachkovski's signature

Ignaty Yulianovich Krachkovsky (Russian: Игна́тий Юлиа́нович Крачко́вский (4 (16) March 1883, Vilnius — 24 January 1951, Leningrad) was a Russian and Soviet Arabist, academician of the Russian Academy of Science (since 1921; since 1925 Academy of Science of the USSR).

Krachkovsky was one of the founders of the Soviet school of Arab studies.

Krachkovsky is known for authoring the translation of Quran into Russian. His book of recollections Among Arabic Manuscripts was awarded Stalin Prize (in 1951).

== Publications ==
Krachkovsky edited and published the Kitāb al-Aḥbār aṭ-Ṭiwāl ('General History') by Abu Hanifa Dinawari (1912) Kratschkovsky wrote an article for the Encyclopedia of Islam on Abī Bakr Muḥammad ibn Yaḥyá al-Ṣūlī the author of the Kitāb al-Awrāq.

The British Arabist James Heyworth-Dunne published an edited Arabic text of Kitāb al-Awrāq as three parts, and in his introduction to the third part titled Ashʻār Awlād al-Khulafāʼ wa-Akhbāruhum (1936), he cites his use of Kratschkovsky's article and refers to communication he had with Kratschkovsky in 1936. (Note: Heyworth-Dunne mentions learning from Kratschkovsky of a proposal by Belaiev to publish an edition of the Leningrad manuscript of the Kitāb al-Awrāq for the period 227-256 AH, and of his own intention to publish in the following year a fourth part covering the period 295-318 AH, from the death of the Abbāsid caliph al-Muktafi to the reign of al-Muqtadir.)
