= Umar ibn Shabba =

Abū Zayd ʿUmar ibn Shabba ibn ʿAbīda ibn Rayṭa al-Numayrī al-Basrī (789–878) was a Basran historian, poet and teacher, who specialized in the histories of notable men, including poets and key cities of the Caliphate: Basra, Kufa, Medina and Mecca. He had a reputation as a reliable historical authority among his contemporaries and later Islamic historians. Although his extensive collection of written works are largely lost, abundant fragments of these works and other materials and quotations of Umar are preserved in the works of later authors, particularly the 10th-century historians al-Tabari and Abu al-Faraj al-Isfahani.

== Biography ==
Umar was born in Basra in 789 and was a mawla (non-Arab, Muslim client or freedman) associated with the Banu Numayr tribe. His father, Zayd, was nicknamed 'Shabba' after a song his mother used to sing him as a child. Umar was educated in Basra before moving to Baghdad where he became a lecturer of the Qur'an, the hadith and adab. He gained a reputation there as a reliable authority and astute scholar. The historian Erling Ladewig Petersen notes Umar had "faiblesse for the historical anecdote". He moved to the Abbasid capital at Samarra likely in c. 853.

Umar was opposed to Mu'tazilism, the rationalist religious doctrine promoted by the Abbasid caliphs at that time. According to the historian Erling Ladewig Petersen, Umar was inclined toward Shia Islam. Not long after moving to Samarra, he was forced to submit to the mihna. Umar defied attempts by the authorities to coerce his adherence to the religious policies of the caliph, which mandated that the Qur'an was created; Umar insisted it was uncreated. As punishment, the authorities destroyed at least part of his collection of written works, leading him to abstain from lectures for a lengthy period. He died in Samarra at the age of ninety. Part of his collections survived and were sold by his son, the poet Abu Tahir Ahmad.

== Historical works ==
The titles of several of Umar's books are listed in the 10th-century al-Fihrist [Catalogue] of bibliographer Ibn al-Nadim, but almost none are extant, save for his history of Medina's notable personalities (Akhbar al-Madina) a later copy of which was partially preserved and published in Beirut in 1990 under the editor Fahim Muhammad Shaltut. This book contained biographical entries about the prophet Muhammad and caliphs Umar (r. 634–644) and Uthman (r. 644–656) and used full isnads (chains of transmission). His other works about Mecca and the Iraqi garrison cities of Basra and Kufa were lost, though his Akhbar ahl Basra [Reports of the People of Basra] is directly quoted in the 10th-century Ta'rikh [History] of historian al-Tabari (the 13th-century geographer Yaqut al-Hamawi also mentions this book, but does not quote from it).

Nevertheless, numerous fragments or materials from Umar's abovementioned works are found in al-Tabari's Ta'rikh and in the Kitab al-aghani [Book of Songs], Tabaqat al-shu'ara and Makatil al-Talibiyyin [The Murder of the Talibiyyin] by Abu al-Faraj al-Isfahani. The latter extensively used Umar's information in his works, though never directly referenced Umar's books. Although he rarely references the titles of Umar's books, al-Tabari's Ta'rikh contains numerous quotations by Umar, indicating the importance of his accounts. The 9th-century historian al-Baladhuri's Ansab al-ashraf [Genealogies of the Nobles] and 10th-century historian al-Marzubani's al-Muwashshah [The Acrostic] also reference Umar's materials, though to a lesser extent.

== Bibliography ==
- Ibrahim, Ayman S. (2021). Conversion to Islam: Competing Themes in Early Islamic Historiography. Oxford: Oxford University Press. ISBN 978-0-19-753071-9.
- Leder, S. (2000). "ʿUmar b. Shabba". In Bearman, P. J.; Bianquis, Th.; Bosworth, C. E.; van Donzel, E. & Heinrichs, W. P. (eds.). The Encyclopaedia of Islam, Second Edition. Volume X: T–U. Leiden: E. J. Brill. pp. 826–827. ISBN 978-90-04-11211-7.
