= John Beasley (chess composer) =

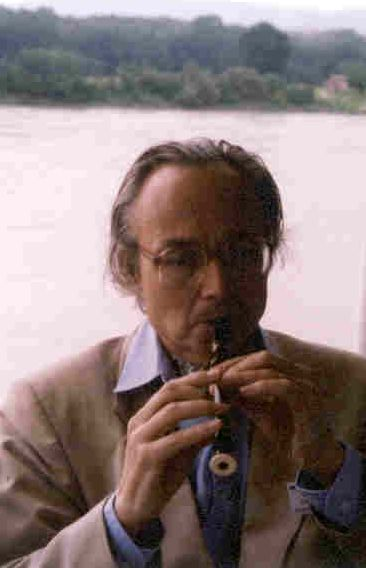
John Beasley

John Derek Beasley (15 February 1940 – 3 March 2024) was a British mathematician and chess composer.

== Biography ==
Beasley published around fifty endgame studies. He became the editor of British Chess Magazine in 1995, and founded the magazine British Endgame Study News (which he edited) in 1996. (It had 65 issues, the last one being published in 2010.) He represented Great Britain at the World Chess Solving Championship in 1977 and 1978.

== Publications ==
He is the coauthor (with Timothy Whitworth) of the books

- Endgame Magic (Bastford 1996, ISBN 071347971X),
- The Ins and Outs of Peg Solitaire (Oxford University Press 1985 ISBN 019286145X),
- The Mathematics of Games (OUP, 1989 ISBN 0486449769).

In 1978, Beasley translated and reissued the celebrated book of Phillipp Klett (1813–1910), Ph. Klett's Schachprobleme mit einer Einführung in die Theorie des Schachproblems, that appeared in 1878 and contained 112 compositions.

== Bibliography ==
- Nicolas Giffard, Alain Biénabe, Le Nouveau Guide des échecs. Traité complet (in French), collection Bouquins, Robert Laffont, 2009 ISBN 978-2-221-11013-3
