= Abel Pavet de Courteille =

French Turkologist (1821–1889)

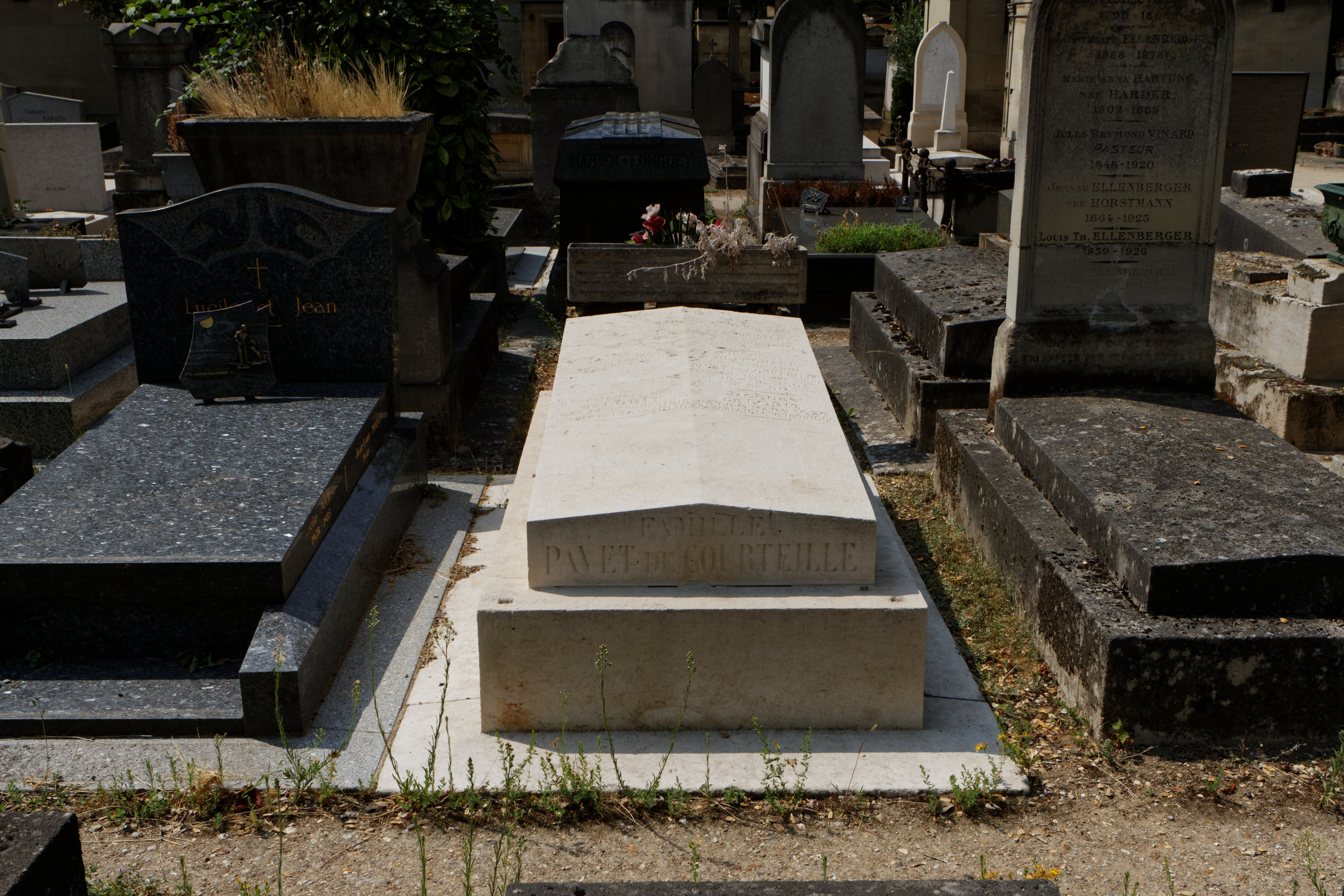
- Grave at Père Lachaise Cemetery.
- Born: Abel Jean Baptiste Michel Pavet de Courteille; 23 June 1821; Paris, France
- Died: 12 December 1889 (aged 68); Paris, France
- Occupation: Orientalist

Abel Jean Baptiste Michel Pavet de Courteille (23 June 1821 – 12 December 1889) was a 19th-century French orientalist, who specialized in the study of Turkic languages.

== Career ==
Through his mother, Sophie Silvestre (1793–1877), he was Antoine-Isaac Silvestre de Sacy's grandson. He taught Turkish at the Collège de France, as extraordinary professor in 1854 and then as holder of an ordinary chair in 1861. In 1873, he succeeded Emmanuel de Rougé at the Académie des inscriptions et belles-lettres. He was also a member of the Société asiatique. He led Turcology to the study of Central Asian languages and was the author of a dictionary of Eastern Turkish and of several editions and translations of texts.

He is buried at Père Lachaise Cemetery (44th division).

== Publications ==
- Dictionnaire turk-oriental, destiné principalement à faciliter la lecture des ouvrages de Babur, d'Aboul-Gâzi et de Ali-Shir Nava'i, Paris, Imprimerie impériale, 1870 (562 pages).
- (with Abdolonyme Ubicini) État présent de l'Ottoman Empire: statistique, gouvernement, administration, finances, armée, communautés non musulmanes, etc., d'après le Salnâmèh (Annuaire impérial) pour l'année 1293 de l'Hégire (1875-76) et les documents officiels les plus récents, Paris, J. Dumaine, 1876.

=== Editions and translations ===
- Conseils de Nabi Efendi à son fils Aboul Khair, published in Turkish with French translation and notes, Paris, Imprimerie impériale, 1857.
- Histoire de la campagne de Mohacz, by Kemal Pacha Zadeh, published for the first time with the French translation and notes, Paris, Imprimerie impériale, 1859.
- Mémoires de Baber (Zahir-ed-Din-Mohammed), founder of the Mongol dynasty in Hindustan, translated from the Chagatai text, Paris, Maisonneuve, 1871.
- Miraj Nameh, published after the Uyghur manuscript, translated and annotated, Paris, E. Leroux, 1882.
- Tezkereh-i-Evliâ. Le Mémorial des Saints, translated from the Uighur manuscript of the Bibliothèque nationale, Paris, 1889-90 (2 vol.).
- (with Charles Barbier de Meynard) Al-Masudi. Les Prairies d'or, Arabic text and French translation, Paris, Imprimerie impériale (nationale), 1861-77 (9 volumes; collection of oriental works published by the Société asiatique).
