= Tamer Karatekin =

Turkish chess player (born 1981)

Personal information
- Born: April 2, 1981 (age 45) Yugoslavia

Chess career
- Country: Turkey
- Title: FIDE Master (1997)
- FIDE rating: 2244 (September 2017)
- Peak rating: 2325 (July 1998)

Tamer Karatekin is a Turkish national chess champion, a children’s chess coach, and an AI educator. He is also a technology professional whose primary focus is on the integration of artificial intelligence systems with chess. He is also a designer and curator of chess-related art projects.

He holds the World Chess Federation titles of FIDE Master (1997), FIDE Trainer (2015), and FIDE School Instructor (2016). Ahead of the 2000 World Chess Olympiad in Istanbul, he won the Turkish Chess Championship in 2000.

Karatekin is an alumnus of the Department of Electrical Engineering and Computer Science at the Massachusetts Institute of Technology (MIT). He competed as the first board for MIT’s chess team where his team tied for third place at the Pan American Intercollegiate Team Championship held in late December 2001.

== Chess career ==
Tamer Karatekin was born in the Macedonian region of Yugoslavia in 1981 and grew up in Oldtown Fatih, Istanbul. He learned chess from his father and his grandfather.

Karatekin won the Turkish Chess Championship in 2000 with a 2-point lead (10/13), ahead of the 2000 World Chess Olympiad in Istanbul. He received the FIDE Master title in 1997 and achieved a peak rating of 2325 in July 1998.

In 1997, he drew games against former world champions Anatoly Karpov and Garry Kasparov in simultaneous exhibitions held in Istanbul.

During his studies at MIT, he competed as the first board player of MIT's chess team, including in matches against rival universities such as Harvard and Caltech. In 2001, his team tied for third place at the Pan American Intercollegiate Team Championship.

== Coaching and chess-in-education leadership ==
Tamer Karatekin coaching career involves the training of high ranking World- and Europe-ranked child players and teaching chess to primary-age students in a compulsory school setting; Some of his students have earned medals in official World and European youth and school chess championships.

During the 2014–2015 academic year, he served as a compulsory chess lesson teacher for 300 primary school students (ages 7 and 8) at Istanbul Technical University Foundation Schools.

He also developed the chess education platform "Deep Sea Chess," which participated in the Istanbul Technical University (ITU) Seed Incubator program (ranked among the top university incubators globally) and organized youth tournaments in collaboration with the Boylston Chess Club.

He served as the technical project coordinator and AI curriculum lead of the EU-funded Erasmus+ shatranj.ai project, which connects chess with artificial intelligence and technology education.

== Design and exhibitions ==
Karatekin is the designer of the ŞAHÎ chess set and related chess iconography, where each chess piece embeds symbols from the names chess pieces have been called in different languages. He has been a co-curator of the history exhibition project focused on historic board games and chess piece designs, SHATRANJ.ART, first displayed at the Hagia Sophia campus of the Fatih Sultan Mehmet Vakıf University.

== Professional career ==
Karatekin holds a MicroMasters credential in Data, Economics, and Development Policy from MIT.

He is a dual career sportsman and served as a product manager for Oracle Cloud Infrastructure's Observability Group.

He co-translated Andriy Burkov's The Hundred-Page Machine Learning Book into Turkish (100 Sayfada Makine Öğrenmesi) alongside Ali Okatan and Kağan Okatan.

Karatekin has given talks on the history of chess, artificial intelligence, and education. He has spoken at TEDxBoston and has also spoken at the IEEE Global Tech Forum on AI. He also presented a speech to the Moroccan Data Scientists community. He was also a contributor to the academic workshop EduAI-20. He is the lead author of a paper on machine learning models which was presented at the 2019 International Conference on Deep Learning and Machine Learning in Emerging Applications (Deep-ML).
