= James Heyworth-Dunne =

British orientalist (1904–1974)

- Born: 1902
- Died: 1974 (aged 71–72); Gloucester, England

Academic background
- Influences: H. A. R. Gibb and Ignatius Krachkovsky

Academic work
- Institutions: SOAS, University of London; Middle East Institute
- Main interests: Arabic literature

James Heyworth-Dunne (1904–1974) was a British orientalist. He studied Arabic literature under Sir H. A. R. Gibb in London in 1932, and became senior reader in Arabic at SOAS, University of London from 1928-1948. Under Gibb's direction he published the edited Arabic texts from the Kitāb al-Awrāķ of Abū Bakr Muḥammad b. Yaḥyā aṣ-Ṣūlī; Kitāb al-Awrāķ : [kism akhbar ash-shuʻara] section on contemporary poets (1934): Akhbār al-Rāḍī wal-Muttaķī (1935): Ash'ār Awlād al-Khulafā’ wa Akhbārum (1936) He associated with Ignatius Krachkovsky, who had written on aṣ-Ṣūlī. He later moved to the Middle East Institute in Washington, D.C. and then lived in Egypt, where he improved Egyptian vernacular. He was multilingual in Arabic, Turkish, Persian and Urdu, collecting, editing and publishing many books about the Islamic world.

== Papers, 1860-1949 ==
The Heyworth-Dunne papers at the Michigan Islamic Manuscripts Collection in Ann Arbor, in addition to collections of Abdul Hamid, Tiflis, Yahuda, and McGregor, constitute the majority holdings of Islamic material held by the M.I.M.C. The university acquired his personal collection of almost exclusively Arabic texts in 1950.

The collection of his papers (1919–49) at the Hoover Institution on War, Revolution and Peace- now the Hoover Institution Archives at Stanford University, California- comprises six boxes of studies, notes, photostats, manuscripts, correspondence, etc., dealing with history, philosophy, literature, education and religion in Egypt, the Arab world and Turkey.

== Works ==
- Al-Ifriqiyya, Journal of the Royal Asiatic Society
- An Introduction to the History of Education in Modern Egypt (1968, 2019; English)
- Religious and Political Trends in Modern Egypt (1950; English) (Note: Heyworth-Dunne dedicates Religious and Political Trends in Modern Egypt to "Sir Walter Monckton and Sir Iltyd N. Clayton, two sincere friends".)
- Al-Yemen: a General Social, Political & Economic Survey (1952-5; English)
- Pakistan, the birth of a new Muslim state (1952; English)
- Egypt, the co-operative movement (1952; English)
- Select bibliography on modern Egypt (1951-2; English)
- Akhbār al-Rāḍī billāh wa-al-Muttaqī lillāh, aw, Tārīkh al-Dawlah al-ʻAbbāsīyah min sanat 322 ilá sanat 333 Hijrīyah, min Kitāb al-awrāq by Muḥammad ibn Yaḥyá Ṣūlī (1935, 2010; Arabic)
- A Basic Bibliography on Islam
- Bibliography and Reading Guide to Arabia (1952; English)
- Kitāb al-awrāq : qism akhbār al-shuʻarāʼ by Muḥammad ibn Yaḥyá Ṣūlī (Arabic)
- Ashʻā r awlād al-khulafāʼ wa-akhbāruhum : min Kitāb al-Awrāq li-Abī Bakr Muḥammad ibn Yaḥyá al-Ṣūlī by Muḥammad ibn Yaḥyá Ṣūlī (1936 – 1979; Arabic)
- Ashʻār awlād al-khulafāʼ wa-akhbāruhum min Kitāb al-awrāq by Muḥammad ibn Yaḥyá Ṣūlī (1936 – 1982; Arabic)
- Kitāb al-ʼawrāq by Muḥammad ibn Yaḥyá Ṣūlī (1934 -1982; Arabic)
- Spoken Egyptian Arabic: English translations of the Arabic text (1937 – 1961; 3 languages)
- Akhbār al-shuʻarāʼ al-muḥdathīn min Kitāb al-awrāq by Muḥammad ibn Yaḥyá Ṣūlī (1979 – 1982; Arabic)
- Land tenure in Islam 630 A.D.-1951 A.D. with a translation of Shaikh Muḥammad Hassanain Makhluf's Fatwa on private property dated 18th April 1948 (1952; English)
- Cours d'arabe égyptien parlé. eds., J. Heyworth-Dunne, M.M. Goma'a, etc.
