= Charles Barbier de Meynard =

French historian and orientalist (1826–1908)

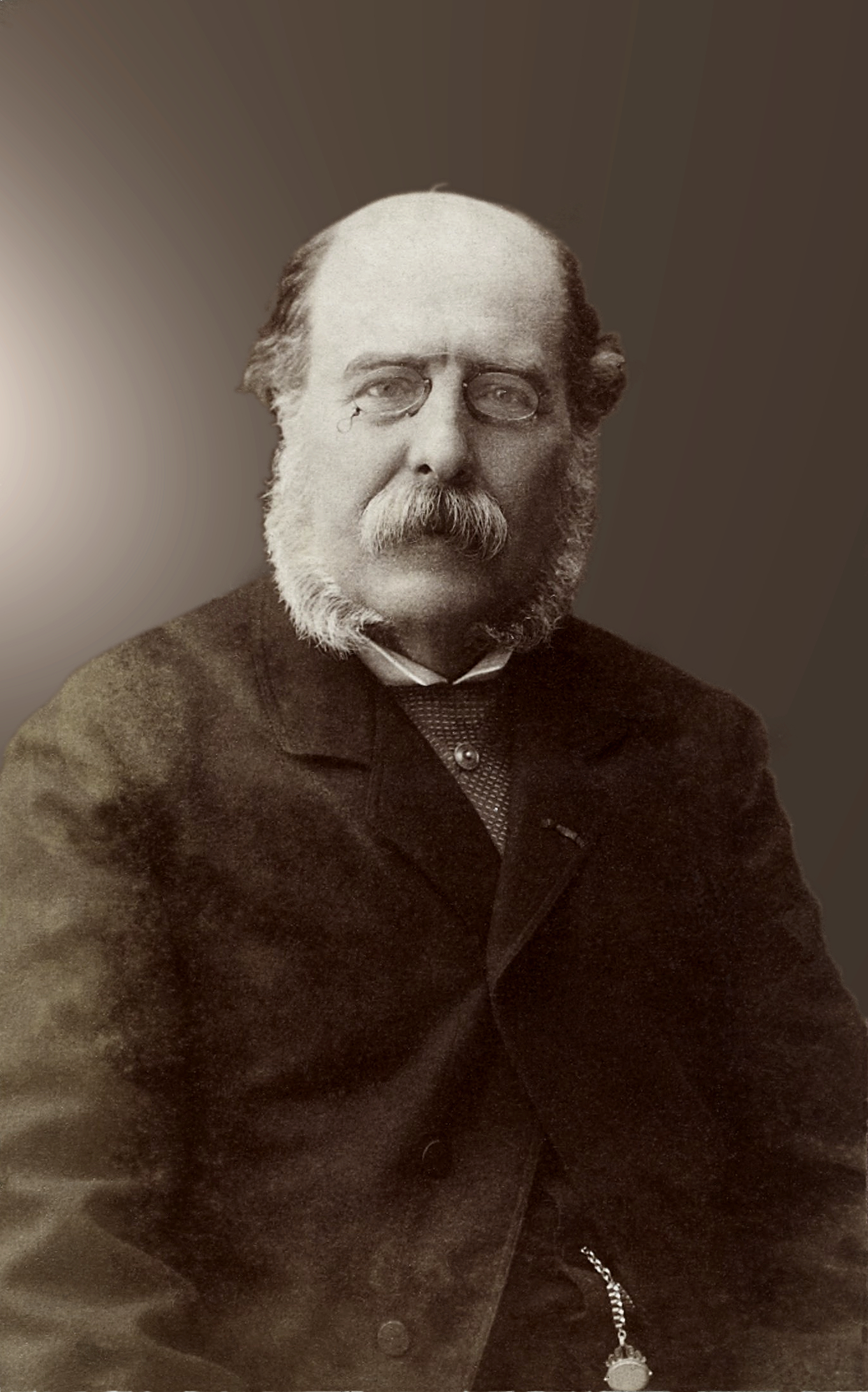
- Born: Charles Adrien Casimir Barbier de Meynard; 6 February 1826 at sea off Constantinople, Ottoman Empire
- Died: 31 March 1908 (aged 82); Paris
- Occupations: Historian; Orientalist

Charles Adrien Casimir Barbier de Meynard (French pronunciation: [ʃaʁl adʁijɛ̃ kazimiʁ baʁbje də menaʁ]; 6 February 1826 – 31 March 1908), born at sea on a ship from Constantinople to Marseille, was a nineteenth-century French historian and orientalist.

== Biography ==
His studies focused on the early history of Islam and the Caliphate. Among his other works, he completed Julius von Mohl's translation of Ferdowsi's Shahnama, with the French title Livre des Rois. This was the first European translation of the pivotal work made available to a wide audience.

Barbier de Meynard also translated numerous works by al-Masudi, ibn Khordadbeh and other Caliphate-era historians. He studied the history of Zoroastrianism, editing the Dictionnaire Géographique de la Perse, and wrote about the then-nascent Baháʼí Faith. He was involved in the editing of the 19th-century edition of Crusader sources in Arabic with French translations, the Recueil des Historiens des Croisades.

Barbier de Meynard was elected a foreign member of the Royal Netherlands Academy of Arts and Sciences in 1895.

== Honors and Awards ==
- Officer of the Order of Legion of Honour

== See also ==
- Yaqut al-Hamawi

== Selected works ==
- Dictionnaire géographique, historique et littéraire de la Perse et des contrées adjacentes, extrait du ″Mo'djem el-Bouldan″ de Yaquout, et complété à l'aide de documents arabes et persans pour la plupart inédits, Paris, Impr. Impériale, 1861, XXI-640 p.
- Le Livre des routes et des provinces par Ibn-Khordadbeh, published, translated and annotated by C. Barbier de Meynard, Paris, Impr. impériale, 1865, 283 p.
- Le Livre des Rois, de Ferdowsî (940-1020), translated and commentated Jules Mohl, in collab. with Charles Barbier de Meynard, Paris, 1876-1878, 7 vol. (Cette traduction a été revue par Charles Pellat en vue d'une nouvelle édition à partir de 1962).
- Traduction nouvelle du traité de Ghazâlî [1058-1111] intitulé : le Préservatif de l'erreur, et notices sur les extases (des soufis), Paris, Impr. nationale, 1877, 93 p.
- Dictionnaire turc-français : supplément aux dictionnaires publiés jusqu'à ce jour, Paris, E. Leroux, 1881-1886, 2 vol., X-786 + 898 p.
- Traduction de L'Alchimiste de Feth-Ali Akhounzadé, Paris, Ed. Imprimerie nationale, 1886; édition numérique consultable sur google :https://archive.org/details/Lalchimiste
- Abou Chamah : Le Livre des deux jardins, histoire des deux règnes : celui de Nour Ed-Dîn et celui de Salah Ed-Dîn, (trad. par Barbier de Meynard), Paris, 1898. In-fol., XI-525 p.
- Mas'ûdî (X^{e}s.- 956 ?),Les Prairies d'or (Murūǧ al-d̲ahab wa-ma´ādin al-ǧawhar), trad. de Barbier de Meynard et Pavet de Courteille, Paris, Impr. Impériale/Nationale, 1861-1877, 9 vol. Nouvelle édition revue par Charles Pellat, Paris, Société asiatique, 1962-1997, 5 vol.
