= Rana Gorgani =

French-Iranian dancer

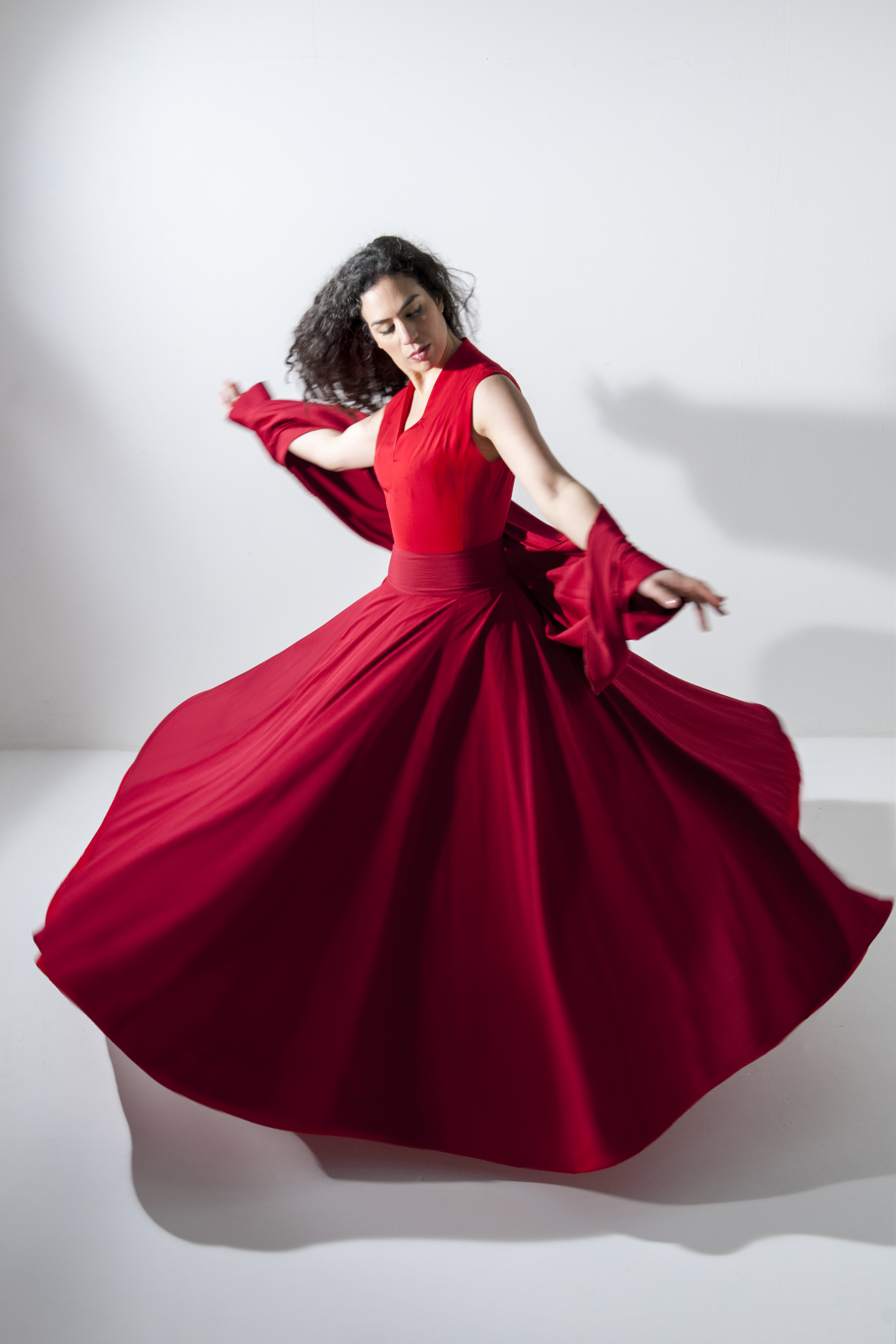
- Gorgani in 2017
- Born: c. 1986 (age 39–40); Germany
- Occupation: Dancer
- Years active: 2007–present
- Known for: Sufi whirling

Rana Gorgani (born c. 1986) is a French-Iranian dancer and a former actress. She performs in the Sufi dance tradition and is one of the world's few female whirling dervishes.

Gorganie was born in Germany to an Iranian mother and a Kurdish father. She grew up and lives in France. She was also an actress who performed with the Conservatoire de Paris 20eme.

At age 24, she decided to dedicate herself to dance. She founded the “l'Oeil Persan” (translated, "The Persian Eye"), the first dance company in Europe specializing in Persian dance.

During the COVID pandemic, she began teaching Sufi dance through Zoom workshops.
