= Khwaja Fakhr al-din Zarradi =

Sufi scholar and author of Usul al-Sama

Khwaja Fakhr al-Din Zarradi (late 13th–mid 14th century) was a Sufi scholar associated with the Chishti tradition who is named in both medieval biographical notices and modern reference works as a figure connected to the circle of Nizamuddin Auliya. He is chiefly known for the Persian treatise Usul al-Sama, a jurisprudential discussion on the conditions and limits of sama (spiritual audition).

== Early life and education ==
Fakhr al-Din is reported in traditional tazkira literature to have been born at Samana and to have studied the classical Islamic sciences before moving to Delhi for advanced instruction; modern reference works summarise these medieval notices without always giving identical details, and therefore specific dates and places are presented cautiously.

== Discipleship ==
Medieval hagiographical accounts—preserved in later tazkira compilations—describe Zarradi's early attitude toward certain practices and his later association with the circle around Nizamuddin Auliya; these narratives belong to the devotional biographical tradition and are treated as such by modern scholars.

== Contribution to Usul-e-Sama ==
Zarradi is the attributed author of the Persian treatise Usul al-Sama, a juristic defence of certain forms of sama (spiritual audition). Modern scholarship treats the treatise as an important South Asian example of a jurist-trained author articulating doctrinal limits and adab (etiquette) for ritual listening, and the primary text survives in manuscript and later printed/scan editions.

== Conflict with the Sultanate ==
Some tazkira accounts recount episodes in which Zarradi and other Chishti figures are presented as critical of particular royal policies during the period commonly associated with Sultan Muhammad bin Tughlaq; because these narratives derive from devotional and later historical compilations they are best presented as reports within the biographical tradition rather than as fully documented court records.

== Death and shrine ==
Medieval biographical notices (tazkira) report that Zarradi died while returning from the Hajj; some versions describe a shipwreck as the cause of death. Modern reference works summarise these varying accounts and note differences in the details across sources.

=== Sarwar Sharif ===
A shrine at Sarwar Sharif is venerated locally in connection with Zarradi; local devotional identifications do not always correspond to documentary proof of burial location and historians caution that conflation of similar names in the tazkira tradition can complicate identification of actual burial places.

== Legacy ==
Zarradi is principally cited in scholarship for his contribution to literature on the jurisprudence of sama and for his place in the Chishti milieu of medieval Delhi; modern studies on Sufi ritual frequently cite his treatise when discussing how Sufi ritual practice negotiated concerns from juridical authorities in medieval South Asia.

== Works ==
- Usul al-Sama — Persian treatise on the principles and limits of spiritual audition (surviving in manuscript and later print/scan editions).
