= Sikma =

Sikma, Sikkema or Siccama is a West Frisian surname. It originated as a patronymic surname, "son of Sikke". Notable people with the surname include:

- Jack Sikma (born 1955), American basketball player, father of Luke
- Luke Sikma (born 1989), American basketball player, son of Jack

Sikkema

- Brent Sikkema (1948–2024), American art dealer
- Ken Sikkema (born 1951), American politician from Michigan
- T. J. Sikkema (born 1998), American baseball player
