= Fahima Mirzaie =

Afghan activist and Sufi dancer

- Born: 1996 (age 29–30); Afghanistan
- Occupations: Sufi dancer; activist; economist

Fahima Mirzaie is an Afghan activist and Sufi dancer who gained global attention as the first female Sufi dancer in Afghanistan in modern Afghan history. She founded the mixed-gender, female-led Sufi dance group Shohod Arefan in Kabul in 2019, and was forced to flee Afghanistan in 2021. Mirzaie was named to the BBC's 100 Women in 2021.

== Biography ==
Professionally, Mirzaie is an economist.

Her interest in the sema ceremony began when she was 12, and since then she became one of the first female performing dervishes in Afghanistan. She has stated it is how she expresses herself and her feelings. In 2019, she created Shohod Arefan, a female-led, mixed-gender group and school she led and taught to perform the Sufi sema ceremony and the Whirling Dervish. She gained international attention for this. She stated that her goals for the school were to foster inner peace and support mental health. She narrowly survived an attack that same year on her way home from a performance in Balkh.

During the COVID pandemic, she closed her school and continued teaching online. In 2021, she was preparing for a major tour around Afghanistan when the Taliban took over; they view Sufi whirling dervishes as haram, and Mirzaie had to flee. Many of her students have not been able to flee, and her school has been ransacked. Later that same year, she was listed as one of the BBC's 100 Women of 2021.

After escaping Afghanistan, Mirzaie has lived in France and continued her work. She performed and led two classes at the Reims Manège and Circus in 2022, and was featured in historian Nadia Khan's 2026 book Dance Histories: A Journey across the Muslim Silk Road.
