= Mevlevi Order =

Sufi order in Islam

- Turkish: Mevlevi Dergahı
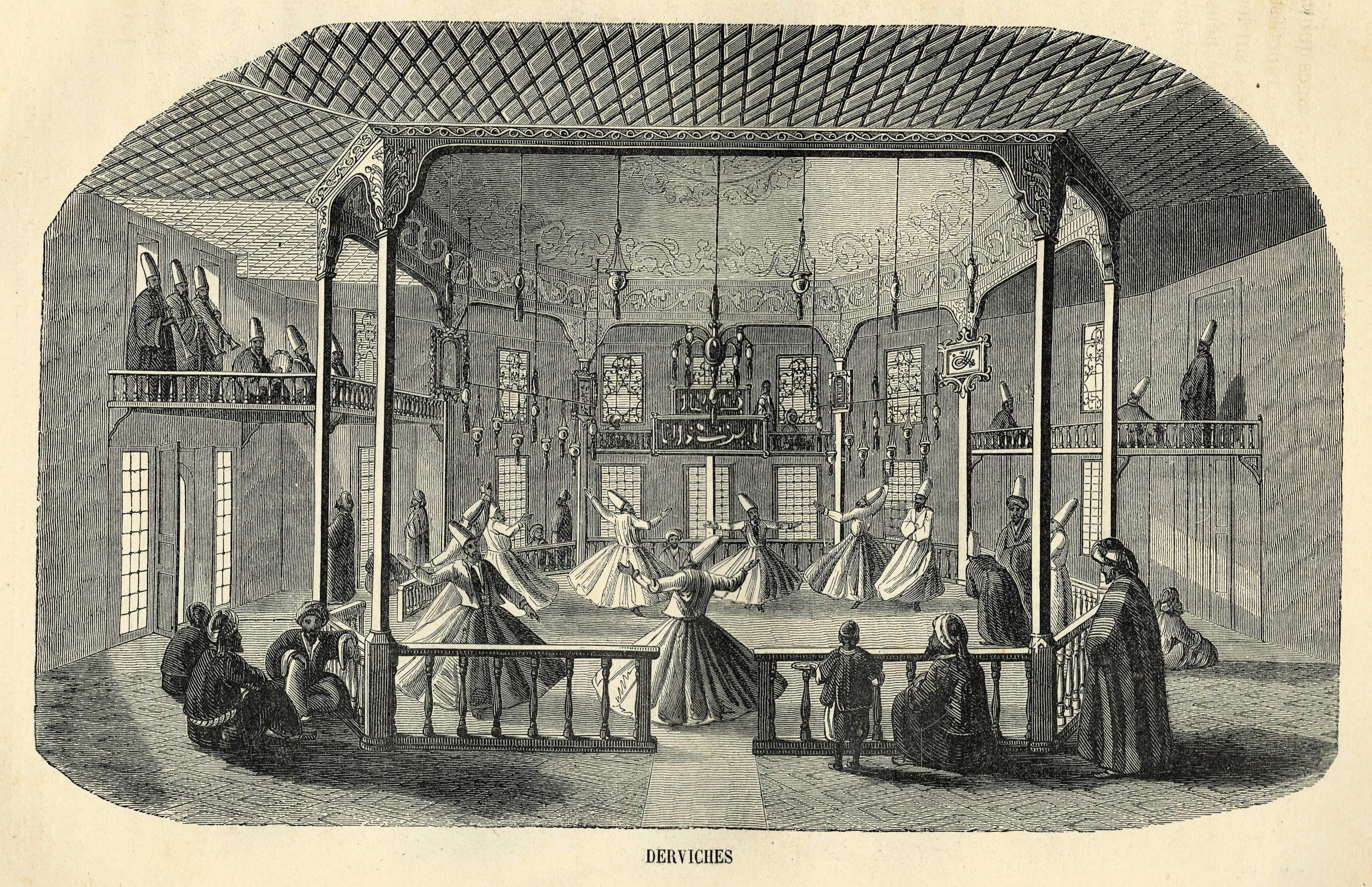
- Whirling dervishes, illustrated in Le Livre d'Or des Voyages by Louis Mainard, c. 1890
- Abbreviation: Mevlevi
- Formation: approx. 1250
- Founder: Baha al-Din Muhammad-i Walad
- Founded at: Sultanate of Rum
- Type: Dervish order
- Headquarters: Konya, Turkey
- Members: ca. 2,000 as of 2015
- Makam Chalabi (Chief Master): Faruk Hemdem
- Wali: Rumi
- Main organ: Diyanet

The Mevlevi Order or Mawlawiyya (Turkish: Mevlevilik; Persian: طریقت مولویه) is a Sufi order that originated in Konya, Turkey (formerly capital of the Sultanate of Rum) and which was founded by the followers of Jalaluddin Muhammad Balkhi Rumi, a 13th-century Persian poet, Sufi mystic, and theologian. The Mevlevis are also known as the "whirling dervishes" due to their famous practice of whirling while performing dhikr (remembrance of God). Dervish is a common term for an initiate of the Sufi path; whirling is part of the formal sema ceremony and the participants are properly known as semazens.

== Principles and practices ==
Approximately 750 years old, the Mevlevi Order was once a living tradition based on the teachings of Rumi, also known as Mevlevi or Mevlana, who is perhaps one of the most celebrated poets in Turkey. He is also venerated as a mystic within Islam. Rumi's friend and mentor, Shams of Tabriz, is also revered within the order and within Sufism.

The Mevlevis insist that love is central to Islam. Mevlevi shaikh Şefik Can writes, "Rumi tells us to take the love of God to the forefront, to abstain from being attached to the letter of the law rather than the spirit of it, to find the essence of the faith, and to raise our faith from the level of imitation to the level of realization."

In addition to obligatory Islamic worship, some of the main spiritual practices within the Mevlevi Order are as follows (in order of importance):

- Study of the Quran and Rumi's works (especially the Masnavi-e-Ma'navi)
- Muraqabah (Islamic meditation)
- Initiatic conversation led by the sheikh (known as sohbet)
- Sema: the whirling ceremony
- Dhikr: invocation of the Divine Names which is believed to purify the heart
- Adab (developing courtesy and mindfulness)

== Sema ==
The Sema with the greatest significance to the Mevlevi order is the annual celebration of Mevlana's "marriage to god" (death), also called Seb-i Arus, meaning Nuptial Night or Night of Union. It is observed for one week, with the final night occurring on the anniversary of his death. Pilgrims from all over the world travel to Konya for the official celebration. The event is so popular that a ticketing system is in place for those who wish to attend.

Rumi mentions whirling in a number of his poems. In one ghazal in the Divani Shamsi Tabriz he says:

Those who turn in the direction of prayer,
whirl in both this world and the next.

Pay heed when a circle of friends whirl,
circling round and round, the Kaaba is the center.

If you wish a mine of sugar, it is there;
and if you wish a fingertip of sugar, it is gratis.

In 2005, UNESCO confirmed "The Mevlevi Sema Ceremony" as amongst the Masterpieces of the Oral and Intangible Heritage of Humanity.

=== Origins of Sema ===
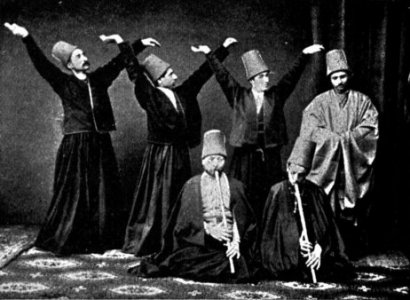
Mevlevi whirling dervishes, 1887

According to a popular story, Rumi was first inspired to whirl when he heard the hammering of the goldsmiths in Konya's bazaar, however, Mevlevi historian Abdülbâki Gölpınarlı believed that Rumi must have learnt whirling from Shams of Tabriz. Şefik Can claimed that whirling was practiced among Sufis at least as early as Abu Sa’id Abu’l-Khayr (d. 1049). Though they have cultivated it to the highest degree, Mevlevis are not the only Sufis who practice whirling, and Kabir Helminski suggests primordial origins: "The practice of whirling may have its origins in the timeless shadows of Central Asian spirituality where shamans used it to induce altered states of consciousness."

=== Method and symbolism ===
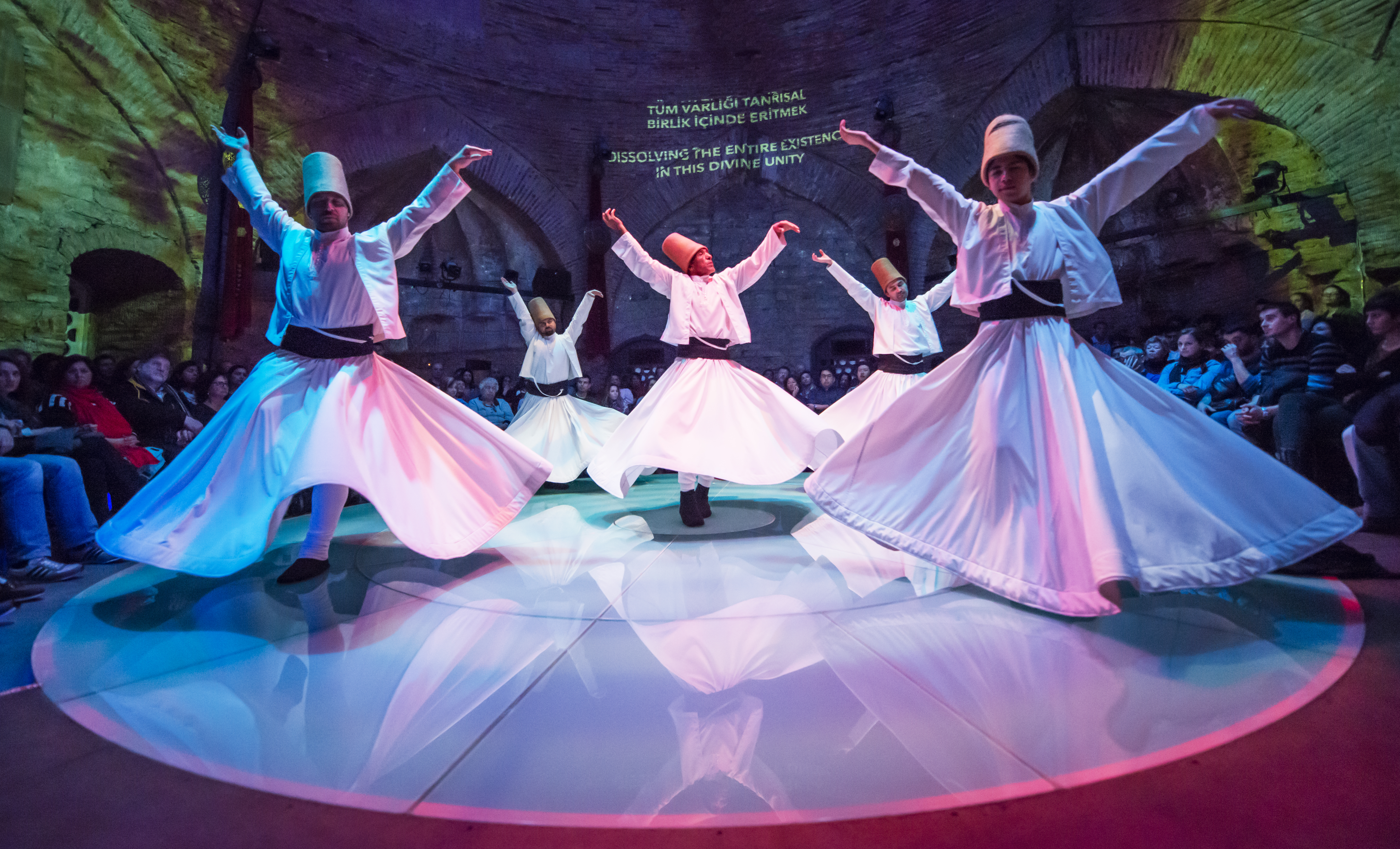
Hodjapasha Culture Center is a restored Ottoman hamam (bathhouse) in Istanbul's Sirkeci district now used for performances of the Mevlevi (whirling dervish) sema.

Sema (or sama) is traditionally practised in a semahane (ritual hall) according to a precisely prescribed symbolic ritual with the semazens whirling in a circle around their shaikh. Semazens whirl using their right foot to propel themselves in a counter-clockwise circle, whilst their left foot remains rooted to the floor acting as an axis about which the semazen turns. Both arms are extended and raised to the level of the head, with the right palm pointing upward (believed to be receiving Divine grace) and the left palm pointing downward (believed to channel that grace to the world). With each 360° turn, the semazen is inwardly chanting "Allah" – a form of dhikr.

The semazens enter wearing a black cloak (hırka) symbolizing death and the grave, which they remove before whirling. On their heads they wear a tall, brown hat known as a sikke, which symbolizes the tombstone and the death of the ego (a version of the sikke is also worn by the Bektashi). Once their cloaks are removed, their long white robes (tennûre) and white jackets (destegül – meaning 'bouquet of roses') become visible. Both are symbols of resurrection.

=== Structure of the ceremony ===
Naat-i Sharif – The naat marks the beginning of the ceremony in which a solo singer offers a eulogy to the Prophet Muhammad. It is concluded with a taksim (improvisation) on the reed flute (ney), which symbolises the Divine breath that gives life to everything.

Devr-i Veled – The Sultan Veled walk involves the semazens walking slowly and rhythmically to the peshrev music. After slapping the ground forcefully (representing the Divine act of creation when God said 'Be!' according to the Quran), they make a circuit in single file around the hall three times, bowing first to the semazen in front of them, and then to the semazen behind them as they begin each circuit. The bow is said to represent the acknowledgement of the Divine breath which has been breathed into all of us and is a salutation from soul to soul. The dervishes then remove their black cloaks.

The Four Salams – The Four Salams (Selams) form the main part of the ceremony and are distinct musical movements. According to Celalettin Celebi and Shaikh Kabir Helminski, "The first selam represents the human being's birth to Truth through knowledge, and through his awareness and submission to God. The second selam represents the rapture of the human being while witnessing the splendour of creation and the omnipotence of God. The third selam is the transformation of rapture into love, the sacrifice of mind to love. It is annihilation of the self within the Loved One. It is complete submission. It is unity.... The fourth selam is the semazen's coming to terms with his destiny. With the semazen's whole self, with all his mind and heart, he is a servant of God, of God's books and His prophets – of all Creation."

Quranic recitation – The ceremony concludes with a recitation from the Quran, which normally includes the following verse: God is in the East and West. And wherever you turn, there is the face of God. (Quran 2:115)

== History ==
=== Early expansion ===
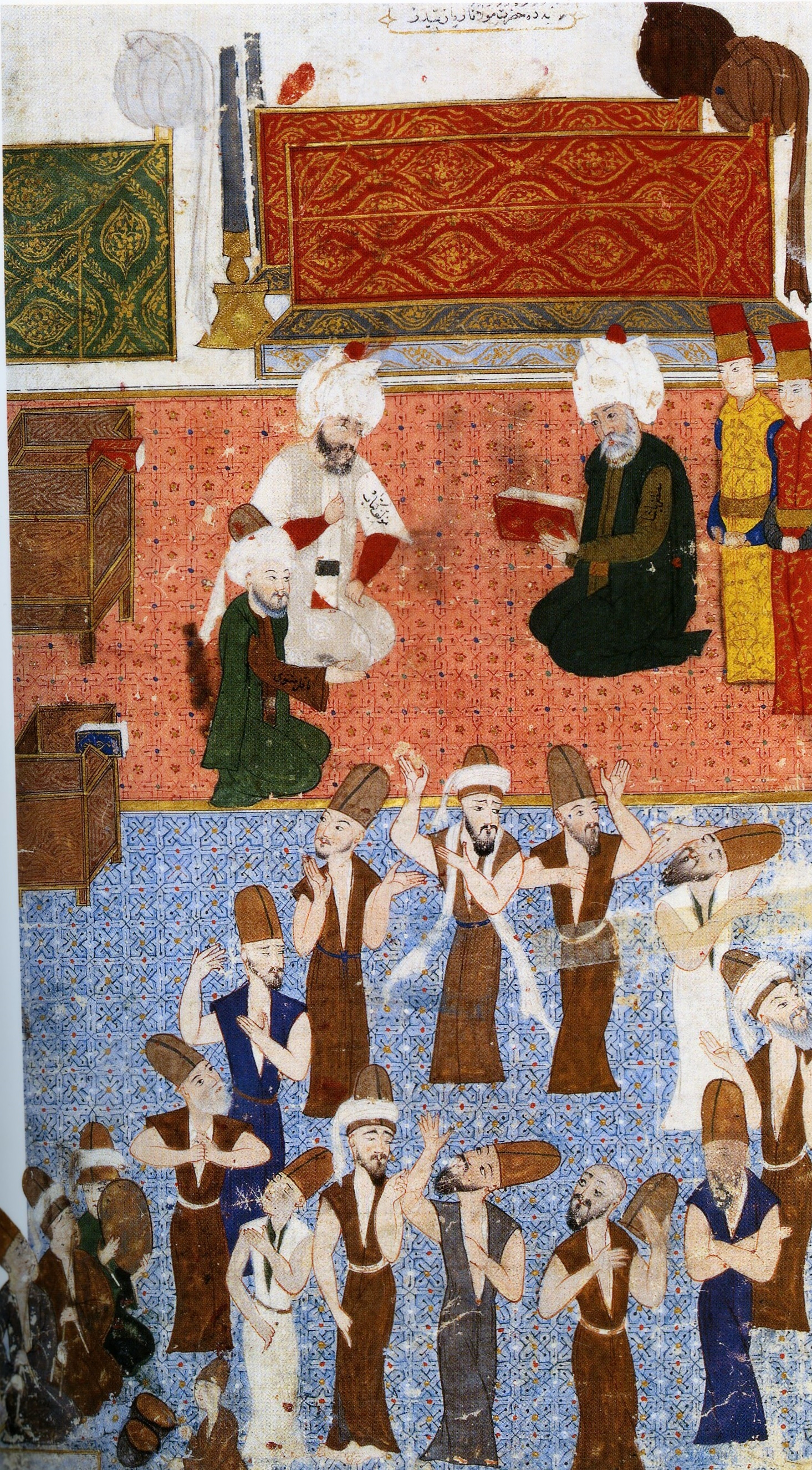
Lālā Muṣṭafa Paşa ("Mustapha Pasha") visiting the Mevlânâ ("Rumi") tomb in Konya circa 1580, with whirling dervishes

The order was established after Rumi's death in 1273 by his son Sultan Veled and Husameddin Chelebi (who inspired Rumi to write the Mathnavi). Like his father, Sultan Veled is celebrated for his poetry. Lyrics he wrote are often sung during the sema ceremony itself, and both he and Husameddin Chelebi are honoured within the order as accomplished Sufi mystics in their own right. It was they who had Rumi's mausoleum built in Konya, which to this day is a place of pilgrimage for many Muslims (and non-Muslims). A number of Rumi's successors, including both Sultan Veled and Husameddin Chelebi themselves, are also buried there. Their personal efforts to establish the order were continued by Sultan Veled's son Ulu Arif Chelebi.

During the Ottoman period, the Mevlevi order spread into the Balkans, Syria, Lebanon, Egypt, and Palestine, especially in Jerusalem. The Bosnian writer Meša Selimović wrote the book The Dervish and Death about a Mevlevi dergah in Sarajevo. Eventually, there were as many as 114 Sufi lodges, the order becoming well established within the Ottoman Empire when Devletşah Sultan Hatun, a descendant of Sultan Veled, married Bayezid I. Their son Mehmed I Çelebi became the next sultan, endowing the order, as did his successors, with many advantages. Many of the members of the order served in various official positions within the empire.

=== The Çelebis ===
To this day, responsibility for overseeing the Mevlevi Order is passed down through the generations of Rumi's male descendants. The head of the order is referred to as Çelebi (Chelebi) which means ‘man of God' or ‘noble, courteous' according to Mevlevi historian Abdülbâki Gölpınarlı. The current Çelebi is Faruk Hemdem Çelebi. He is also president of the International Mevlana Foundation, a Turkish cultural and educational foundation managed by his sister and vice-president Esin Çelebi Bayru. Shaikhs, who have the authority to teach Mevlevi practices and philosophy, are appointed by the Çelebi.

=== Artistic heritage ===
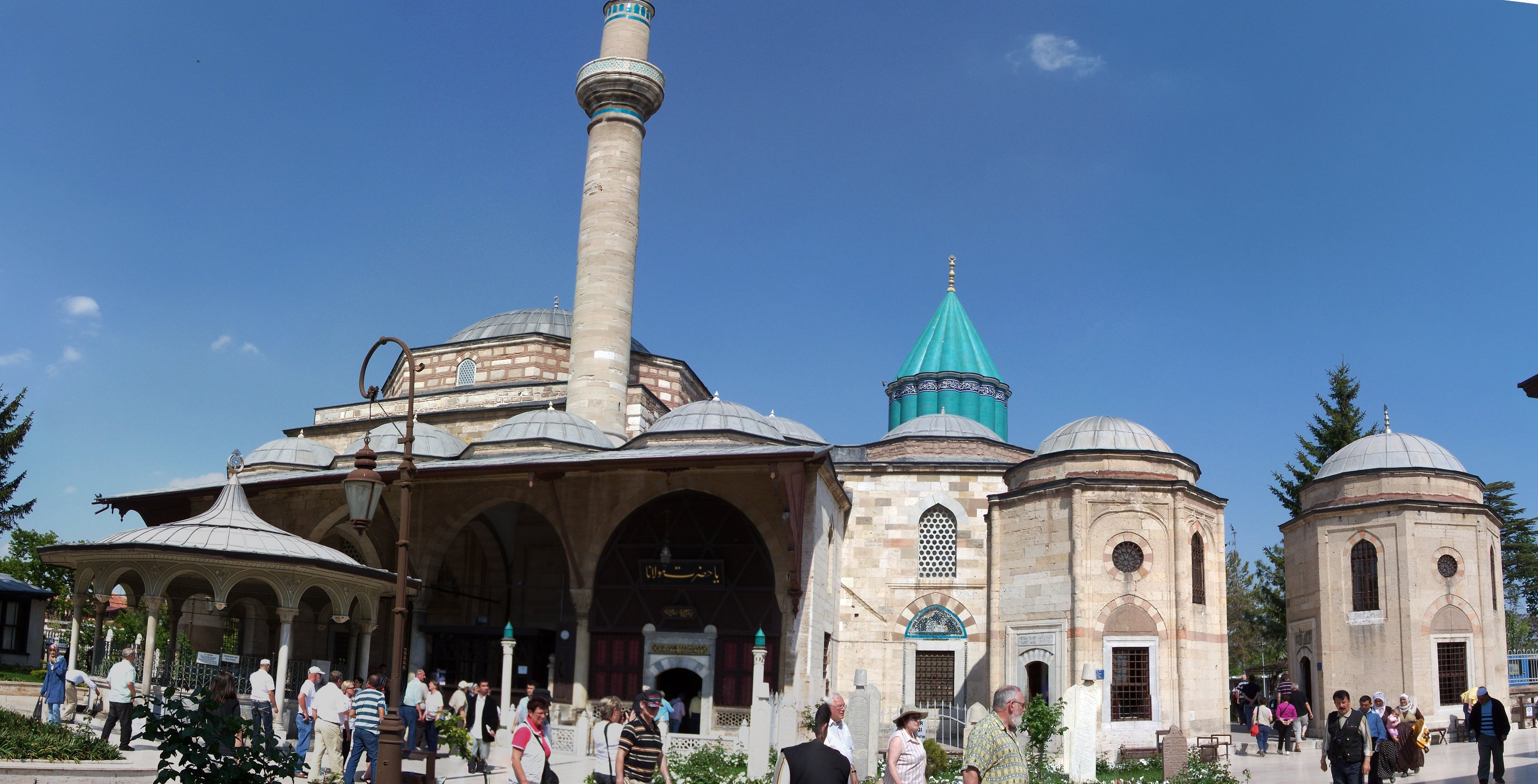
Mevlana Museum in Konya.

Rumi's Mathnavi and Diwan-e Shams-e Tabrizi are considered masterpieces of Persian literature, and throughout the centuries the Mevlevi Order has continued its long-standing association with the arts in Turkey. Apart from the works of Rumi and Sultan Veled, other famous literary works by Mevlevis include influential commentaries on Rumi's Mathnavi by Ismāʿil Rusūhī Ankarawi (d. 1631) and Ismāʿil Ḥaqqı Burṣalı (d. 1724), the latter also being 'a fine mystical poet' in his own right. The most celebrated Mevlevi poet, after Rumi and Sultan Veled, is Shaykh Ghalib Dede (d. 1799), the author of Hüsn ü Aşk and ‘perhaps the last true master of Turkish classical poetry' according to scholar Annemarie Schimmel. Both Ghālib Dede and Ankarawī are buried at the Galata Mevlevihanesi.

A number of the most celebrated Turkish musicians have been Mevlevis, and during the Ottoman era the Mevlevi Order produced a great deal of vocal and instrumental music. Mustafa Itri (1640–1712), an Ottoman-Turkish musician, composer, singer and poet, is regarded as the master of Turkish classical music Ismail Dede (1778-1846) is also considered one of Turkey's greatest classical composers and wrote the music for the ceremonial songs (ayins) played during the sema ceremony. Celebrated female musicians and composers include Dilhayat Khalifa (early 1700s) and Layla Saz (late 1800s – also buried at Galata Mevlevihanesi).

=== The Mevlevi Regiment ===
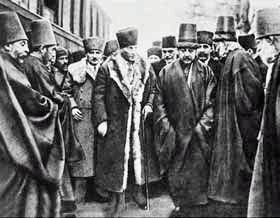
Atatürk in 1923, with members of the Mevlevi Order, before its institutional expression became illegal and their dervish lodge was changed into the Mevlana Museum.

During World War I, the Mevlevi Regiment served in Syria and Palestine under the command of 4th Army. A battalion of some 800 dervishes was formed December 1914 in Konya (the Mucahidin-i Mevleviyye) and was sent to Damascus. Another battalion of regular recruits was added at the end of August 1916, and together they formed the Mevlevi Regiment. This unit did not fight until the end of the Palestine campaign and was disbanded at the end of September 1918.

Mustafa Kemal met with members of the Mevlevi Order in 1923 before its institutional expression became illegal.

=== 1925 ban on Sufism in the Turkish Republic ===
Sufism was outlawed in Turkey in September 1925 by the new Turkish Republic under Atatürk. As a result, the Dervish lodge in Konya eventually became the Mevlana Museum. According to the International Mevlana Foundation, preceding the ban 'Atatürk uttered the following words about the Mevlevi Order to Abdulhalim Chalabi, "Makam Chalabi" of Konya, and furthermore the Vice President of the First House of Representatives: "You, the Mevlevis have made a great difference by combating ignorance and religious fundamentalism for centuries, as well as making contributions to science and the arts. However we are obliged not to make any exceptions and must include Mevlevi tekkes. Nonetheless, the ideas and teaching of Mevlana will not only exist forever, but they will emerge even more powerfully in the future."'

Though the Sufi lodges were forced to close down, Mevlevi practice continues within Turkey but in a more restricted and private mode. Sufism is still officially illegal in Turkey, and sema ceremonies are therefore officially presented as cultural events of historical interest rather than as worship.

A number of groups and individuals who have no connection to the Mevlevi Order claim to present "Mevlevi whirling," often for the entertainment of tourists.

=== Mevlevi Order comes to the West ===
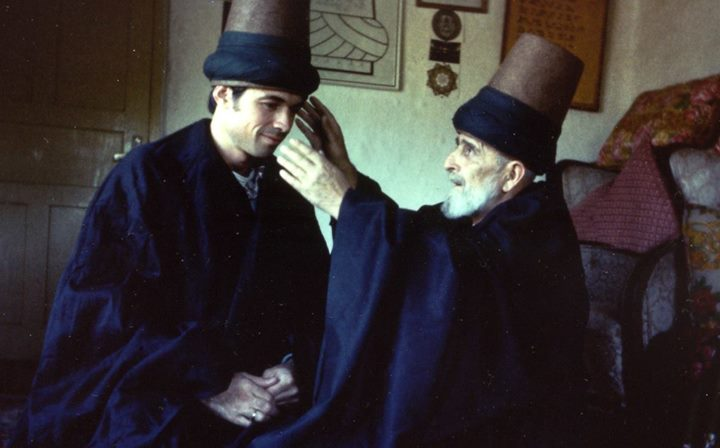
Suleyman Loras with David Bellak in Konya

In the latter half of the twentieth century, the Mevlevi Order began to make its presence felt in the West. This was due to the great popularity of English translations and versions of Rumi's poetry (especially by Coleman Barks), but was also due to the influence of Shaikh Suleyman Hayati Lorasulam of Konya - known as Süleyman Dede]. He began training in the Konya Mevlevi dergah in the early 1920s, and was appointed as a Mevlevi Sheikh in the 1960s by Dr Celaleddin Çelebi, whose grandfather had been the last Mevlevi leader in Konya before the 1925 closures. Suleyman Dede made a number of trips to the USA, Canada and Europe in the 1970s, and appointed several Westerners as Mevlevi teachers for the first time, including Reshad Feild, David (Daud) Bellak and Kabir Helminski, and sent his son Jelaleddin Loras to live and teach in America. David Bellak took Suleyman Dede's teaching to Edinburgh in Scotland where he settled in 1982 and established this strand of Mevlevi practice.

There are ongoing disagreements whether Süleyman Dede had the traditional authority to appoint others as Mevlevi shaikhs, or only as his own deputies. At this point in time, there was no functioning Mevlevi Order or hierarchy, and prior to 1925 there had been a variety of means for succession of leadership in the Mevlevi centres that were spread around the Ottoman Empire.

Around the 1970s, Mevlevi dervishes also began to present the whirling ceremony to audiences in the West. In 1971, they performed in London with Kâni Karaca (known as the 'Voice of Turkey') as lead singer. In 1972, they toured North America for the first time with Kâni Karaca, Ulvi Erguner, and Akagündüz Kutbay among the musicians. Since the 1990s there have been several tours of the United States, including those led by the first Westerner to be officially initiated as a shaikh in the Mevlevi Order, Kabir Helminski. Since the 1980s, the Helminskis (Kabir and Camille) have presented their own ideas of Mevlevi principles and practice to Western audiences through books, seminars, retreats, and their organisation Threshold Society. Practising Mevlevis under the tutelage of a recognised shaikh can now be found across the globe.

=== Women in the Mevlevi Order ===
Camille Helminski explains in her book, Women of Sufism, A Hidden Treasure, how Rumi had a number of noteworthy female students, and how in the early days of the order there were instances of female shaikhs and semazens, such as Destina Khatun (who was appointed shaykha of the Kara Hisar Mevlevi lodge). "In the early days of the Mevlevi order, women and men were known to pray, share sohbet (spiritual conversation), and whirl within each other's company, though more often as the centuries unfolded, women held their own semas and men also whirled in zhikr separate from women. However, in the time of Mevlana [Rumi], spontaneous semas would occur including both men and women". In the same book, Camille Helminski presents a 1991 letter from Celaleddin Bakir Çelebi, the Çelebi heading the order, which granted permission for men and women to once more whirl together in mixed Mevlevi ceremonies.

In 2019, Fahima Mirzai, an Afghan, gained international recognition for founding a largely-female school for the Whirling Dervish in Kabul. In 2021, she fled to France after the 2021 Taliban offensive.

== Relationship with the Ottoman Empire ==
=== Early Patronage and Expansion ===
The first recorded relationship between the Mevlevi Order and the Ottoman state dates back to the late 14th century. During the reign of Sultan Murad I, Ali Pasha, son of Grand Vizier Khalil Khayr al-Din Pasha, commissioned the construction of a Mevlevi lodge (Tekke) in 1387. This marked the beginning of the order's integration into the Ottoman religious and cultural landscape. The following century saw further patronage, particularly from Mehmed, known as the Conqueror, who not only established the first Mevlevi lodge in Istanbul but also restored the Konya fortress and Rumi’s mausoleum, dedicating endowments to maintain the shrine.

During the reign of Bayezid II, Jalal al-Din Rumi’s mausoleum was renewed, its interior was adorned, and luxurious fabric was provided to cover the tomb. The Mevlevi Order gained reached new heights under Sultan Selim III, who actively engaged with Mevlevi teachings. He read the Mathnawi (Masnavi), played the ney (reed flute), performed Mevlevi melodies, and visited Mevlevi lodges in Istanbul. His patronage led to the establishment of dedicated endowments for Mathnawi teachings in imperial mosques. This period is often considered the golden age of the Mevlevi Order.

=== Mevlevi Influence in Ottoman Ceremonial and Political Life ===
By the late Ottoman period, the Mevlevi Order held a significant ceremonial role in state affairs. Sultan Mehmed V Reşâd demonstrated reverence for the Mevlevi tradition by involving the order in his enthronement ritual. During a visit to Rumi’s mausoleum, he entrusted a sword belonging to Caliph Omar to the grandson of Rumi, Abdülhalim Çelebi, who girded the sword at the Sultan’s waist before performing a two-rakat prayer. This act symbolized the deep intertwining of the Mevlevi Order with Ottoman legitimacy and spiritual authority.

=== Muradiye Convent-Mosque and Changing Political Relations ===
The Muradiye convent-mosque in Edirne is an early example of Ottoman patronage for the Mevlevi Order. Built by Sultan Murad II, it was the first Mevlevi convent commissioned by an Ottoman ruler.

According to a legend, Murad II dreamt of meeting Rumi at the site and vowed to construct a Mevlevi lodge there. This project may have been a way to strengthen the Sultan’s influence in western Anatolia by aligning with the Mevlevis, who held social influence in the region. However, between 1435 and 1453, Murad II expelled the Mevlevis, possibly for political reasons, and the convent-mosque was turned into a congregational mosque.

=== Literary and Artistic Contributions ===
Several Persian biographies of Rumi were commissioned during the Ottoman era, including an official Turkish translation of Aflākī’s 14th-century account, ordered by Sultan Murad III in 1590. This translation, known as Tarjuma-i Thawāqib-i manāqib, was created by Darvīsh Mahmud Mesnevī Khān of Konya. Some of the illustrated manuscripts from this period, featuring miniatures depicting Rumi’s life and teachings, are preserved in collections such as the Topkapi Palace Museum and the Morgan Library.

The Mevlevi Order’s influence extended into Ottoman education and architecture. The Madrasa of Sultan Walad, built within the Mevlevi complex in Konya by Sultan Murad III in 1584, was named after Rumi’s son, reflecting the lasting ties between the order and the ruling class. More recently, in 2004, a conference hall named after Sultan Walad was included in the Mevlana Cultural Centre in Konya. This site hosted the first international conference dedicated to Sultan Walad in 2011, bringing together scholars from around the world to discuss his contributions.
