= Şefik Can =

Turkish Sufi master

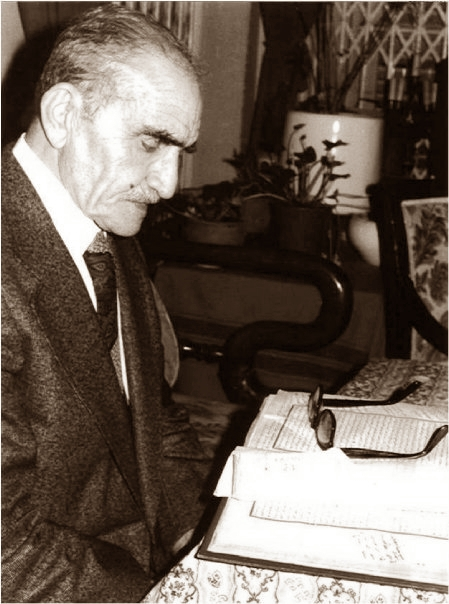
Şefik Can

Şefik Can (June 22, 1909 – January 23, 2005) was a Turkish spiritual leader and the last Sufi master in the Mevlevi Sufi tradition in Turkey.

== Biography ==
Born in 1909 in Tebricik village of Erzurum, Şefik Can completed his primary education in Yıldızeli, Sivas. Can learned Arabic and Persian at an early age from his father, and graduated from the Kuleli Military High School in 1929 and the Military Academy in 1931. Then, with the permission of the Ministry of National Defense, he became a teacher at Istanbul University, and in 1935, completed his internship under Tahirü l-Mevlevi at Kuleli Military High School. Until his retirement in 1965, he taught at various military schools, civilian colleges and high schools. He was initiated into the Mevlevi Sufi order by his spiritual teacher Tahir al-Mevlevi and had been the head of the tradition until his death on January 23, 2005. He was the spiritual teacher of Hayat Nur Artiran.

== Works ==
- Fundamentals of Rumi's Thought: A Mevlevi Sufi Perspective (Tughra Books, Jan 1, 2006, Originally published in 1995)
