= Usul al-Sama =

Treatise by sufi saint Fakhr al-din Zarradi

Usul al-Sama is a treatise written by Khwaja Fakhr al-din Zarradi, a sufi saint and disciple of Nizamuddin Auliya in Persian language. The book is based on the Usul of Sama, a sufi gathering. He proved the use of some musical instruments are not Haram (forbidden) under the Shariah. The book has been translated into Arabic, Urdu, Hindi and English languages. It is known that Zarradi written two treaties on the matter of Sama, but only one exists till today.
