= Nur Artıran =

Sufi master

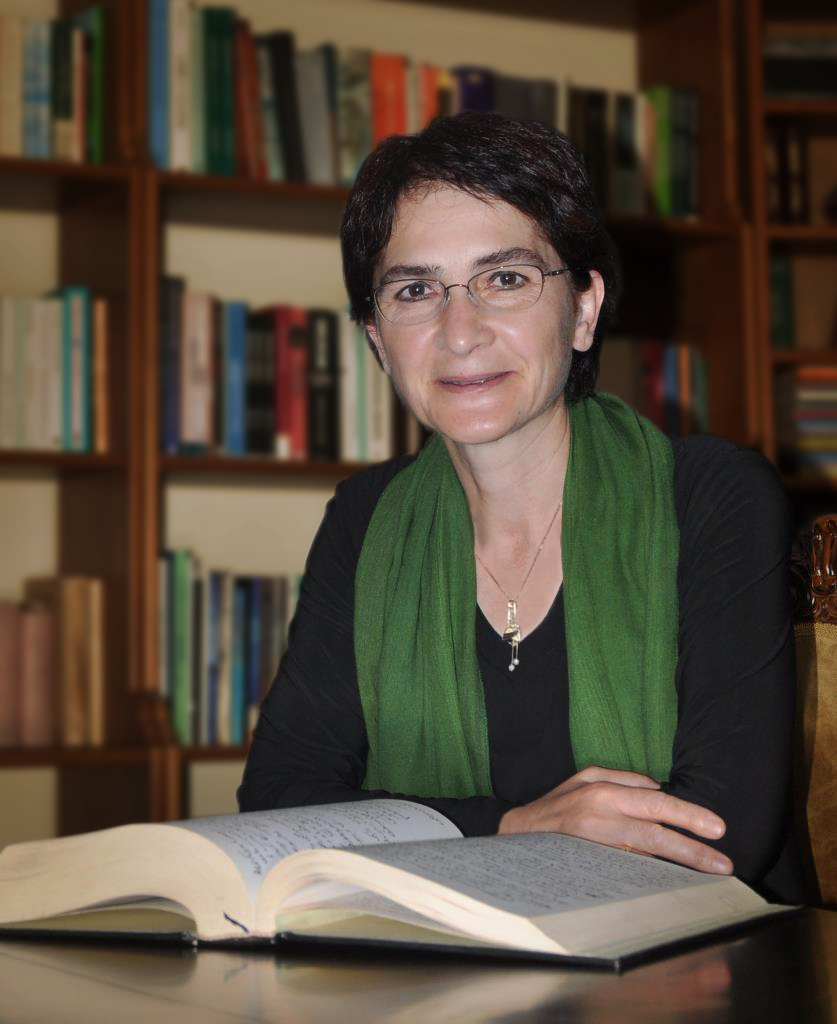
Hayat Nur Artiran

Hayat Nur Artıran (born 1954) is a researcher, writer, scholar and educator on the path of Rumi. Her Sufi Master was Şefik Can of whom she is the successor. She is the President of the Şefik Can International Mevlânâ Education and Culture Foundation.
