= Kabir Edmund Helminski =

American translator and writer

Kabir Edmund Helminski (born July 1, 1947) is the author of a number of books on contemporary Sufism, a translator of Sufi poetry (especially the poetry of Rumi), and is the co-founder and co-director of Threshold Society. In 2001, Kabir was the first Muslim to deliver the Harold M. Wit Lectures on Spirituality in Contemporary Life at Harvard Divinity School. In 2007, he was also one of the original signatories of “A Common Word Between Us and You” an open letter by Islamic scholars to Christian leaders calling for peace and understanding.

In 2009, he was named as one of the “500 Most Influential Muslims in the World” by the Royal Islamic Strategic Studies Center in association with Georgetown University. In 2017 he was consulted and quoted in the Declaration on Humanitarian Islam, a detailed roadmap for the recontextualization of Islamic Orthodoxy by the world's largest Muslim organization, Nahdlatul Ulama/Ansor, based in Indonesia.

== Sufism ==
Helminski's connection to Sufism began under the guidance of Suleyman Hayati Loras of Konya (commonly referred to as Suleyman Dede):

"I am forever grateful for how Dede effected a shift in my perception of reality. I am convinced now, and more and more every day, that all of existence derives from Love. The most important thing I learned from my Murshid is that everything is in the service of Love. This loving Mercy, Rahmah, imbues every particle of existence."

In 1990 Helminski was given permission (Ijazet) by the late Celalettin Çelebi, head of the International Mevlana Foundation, to lead the Sema ceremony as Postnishin (Shaikh). Between 1994 and 2000 Kabir toured five times as Shaikh with the Whirling Dervishes of Turkey, bringing the spiritual culture of the Mevlevis to tens of thousands of people in the US, Canada, and India.

His writings are particularly concerned with Sufi psychology and with expressing the subtle relationships the author sees between the ego (the lower levels of the nafs), the soul (the higher levels of the nafs), the heart (qalb), and Spirit (Ruh). Providing a metaphysical context for human consciousness, and practical means for refining and expanding it, are major concerns. Helminski presents Islam as a training system that allows us to become more “present,” capable of love, and able to express Spirit.

== Threshold Society ==
In 1983, Helminski co-founded the Threshold Society, a non-profit organization, with his wife, Camille Helminski (also a teacher in the Sufi tradition, as well as an author and translator). The stated aim of Threshold Society is to “facilitate the experience of Divine unity, love and wisdom in the world”, and its principal means for doing so is through educational programs and retreats in spiritual psychology and practice, as well as through books, audio recordings, and online materials.

Threshold Society reflects the Helminskis' ongoing focus to develop and share a contemporary approach to Islamic Sufi concepts and practice, both within the Islamic community and outside of it.

A number of Threshold groups now exist across the world, meeting regularly to engage in the spiritual practices promoted by the society (particularly zhikr and the study of Rumi’s poetry). The main group, led in person by Kabir and Camille Helminski, currently meets in San Diego, US, while there are also a number of groups meeting in other locations, including the US, Canada, Mexico, UK, Holland, Turkey, South Africa, Pakistan, and Indonesia.

== Interspiritual work ==
For 10 years Kabir and Camille collaborated with The Spiritual Paths Foundation, a group a contemplative teachers from Christian, Jewish, Buddhist, Native American, and Hindu traditions, to offer programs in applied inter-spirituality. Their work is archived at spiritualpaths'.net

== Publications ==
Helminski's books on Sufism have been translated into a number of languages, including French, Dutch, German, Portuguese, Spanish, Italian, Bosnian, Bulgarian, Arabic, Turkish, Russian, Persian, and Indonesian.

Living Presence: The Sufi Path to Mindfulness and the Essential Self, was first published by Tarcher/Putnam in 1992. A “Revised and Updated 25th Anniversary Edition” was published in 2017 as part of Tarcher Cornerstone Editions. ISBN 978-0143130130

The Knowing Heart: A Sufi Path of Transformation, was published by Shambhala, 1999. ISBN 978-1570625664

Holistic Islam: Sufism, Transformation, and the Needs of our Time was published by White Cloud Press in 2017. ISBN 978-1940468556

In the House of Remembering, The Living Tradition of Sufi Teaching. Published Threshold Books in 2020. ISBN 978-0939660407

The Mysterion: Rumi and the Secret of Becoming Fully Human. Shambhala, 2023. ISBN 978-1645471448

Helminski has also authored two volumes for the Book Foundation, The Book of Language: Exploring the Spiritual Vocabulary of Islam (2006) ISBN 978-1904510161, and The Book of Revelations: A Sourcebook of Selections from the Qur’an (2005) ISBN 978-1904510123

Helminski's translations of Rumi's poetry include the following volumes:

- Ruins of the Heart, Selected Lyric Poetry of Jalaluddin Rumi, Threshold (1980) ISBN 978-0939660032
- Love is a Stranger, Selected Lyric Poetry of Jalaluddin Rumi, Threshold & Shambhala (1992) ISBN 978-1570625275
- Rumi: Daylight (trans. Kabir & Camille Helminski, Shambhala, 2000) ISBN 978-1570625305
- Jewels of Remembrance: 365 Selections from the Wisdom of Rumi (trans. Kabir & Camille Helminski, Shambhala, 2000) ISBN 978-1590304815
- The Pocket Rumi (trans. Kabir & Camille Helminski, Shambhala, 2008) ISBN 978-1590306352
- Love's Ripening: Rumi on the Heart's Journey (trans. Kabir Helminski & Ahmad Rezwani, Shambhala, 2010) ISBN 978-1590307595
- The Rumi Daybook: 365 Poems and Teachings from the Beloved Sufi Master (trans. Kabir & Camille Helminski, Shambhala, 2011) ISBN 978-1590308943
