= Hüsn ü Aşk =

Turkish verse romance by Sheikh Ghalib

Hüsn ü Aşk (literally: Beauty and Love) is the magnum opus of Turkish Mevlevî poet Şeyh Gâlib. Hüsn ü Aşk consists of 2101 verses and is an allegory of major themes in Sufi Islam.

Hüsn ü Aşk tells the tale of two lovers, Hüsn (lit. "Beauty") and Aşk ("Love"). According to the story, Hüsn and Aşk were born on the same night to the same clan. Eventually they fall for each other but when Aşk intends to ask for her hand in marriage from elders of the clan, he is ridiculed by the elders and asked to bring kimyâ ("chemistry") from the land of Kalb ("Heart") if he intends to be with Hüsn. As a result of this request, Aşk sets for a journey to the land of Kalb along with his servant Gayret ("perseverance"). Aşk and Gayret encounter many obstacles during their journey and face numerous dangers.

In the end, all the trials Aşk had to go through were due to his belief that Hüsn was a different person than himself when actually Aşk and Hüsn are one and the same.

All of the names used in the story, including the names of characters and places, are Sufi terms. The story is full of symbolism and is meant to be taken, not for its literal meaning but rather, for its symbolic and esoteric meaning; one's journey towards God, where one sees at the end that he himself is actually a reflection of God, hence is one with God because there is no being other than God.

== Translation ==
- Beauty and Love, trans. by Victoria Rowe Holbrook, Modern Language Association of America (2005) ISBN 0-87352-934-0
