= Şeyh Gâlib =

Turkish poet and mystic (1757 – 1799)

Şeyh Galip
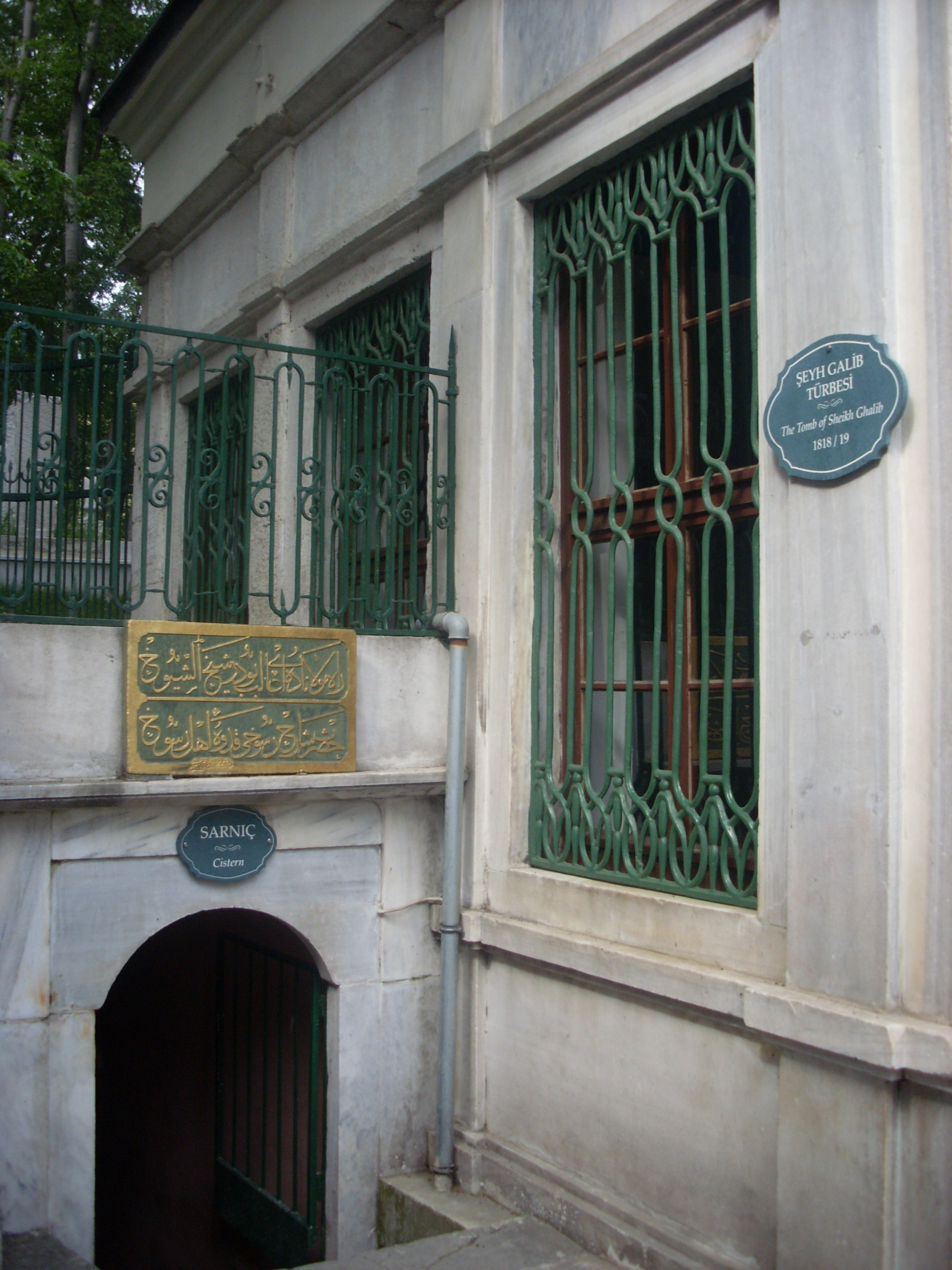
- Born: 1757; Istanbul
- Died: 3 January 1799 (aged 41); Istanbul
- Occupations: Poet, writer
- Writing career
- Language: Turkish

Galib Mehmed Esad Dede, known as Sheikh Galib (1757 – 3 January 1799), was a Turkish divan literature poet and mystic.

== Biography ==
His real name was Mehmed. He used the pseudonym Es'ad given by his teacher Hodja Neş'et, from whom he learned a lot by participating in literary conversations, until 1784, and then he took the pseudonym Gâlib. He was appointed as the sheik of the Galata Mevlevi Lodge on 9 June 1791. Galib Mehmed Esad Dede died in 1799 and was buried in the tomb in the courtyard.

== Bibliography ==
Poems

- Divan (Şiirler)
- Hüsn ü Aşk (Güzellik ve Aşk)
- Şerh-i Cezîre-i Mesnevî
- Es-Sohbetü's-Sâfiyye
- Zübde-i alem
