= Hodjapasha Culture Center =

Tourist attraction in Istanbul, Turkey

Coordinates: 41.0141°N 28.9756°E

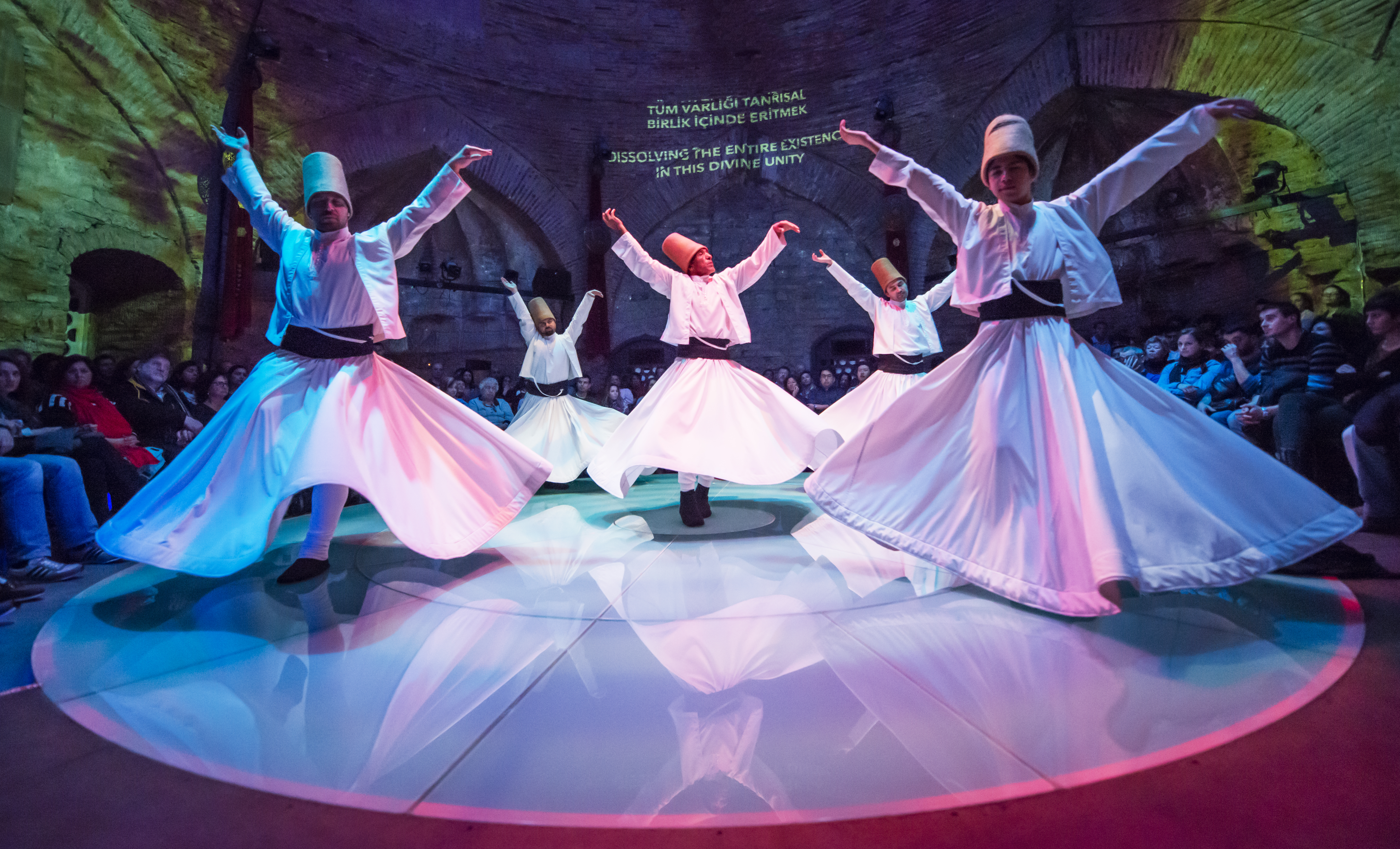
- Whirling dervish show at the center
- Interactive map of Hodjapasha Culture Center
- Address: Turkey

The Hodjapasha Culture Center is housed in a former 15th-century hammam in Istanbul, Turkey. It hosts whirling dervish ceremonies, as well as other events such as the dance show "Rhythm of the Dance".

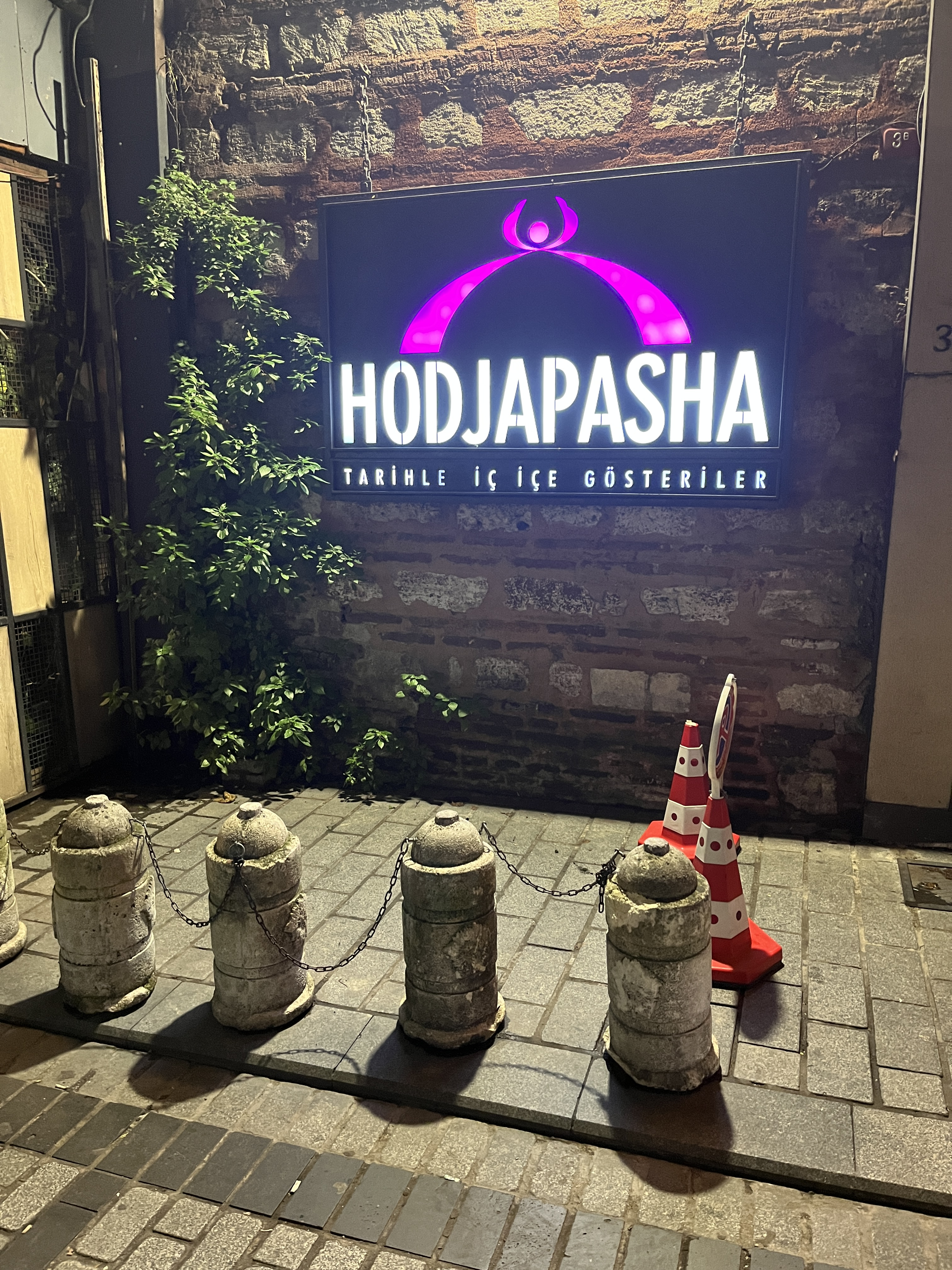
Exterior

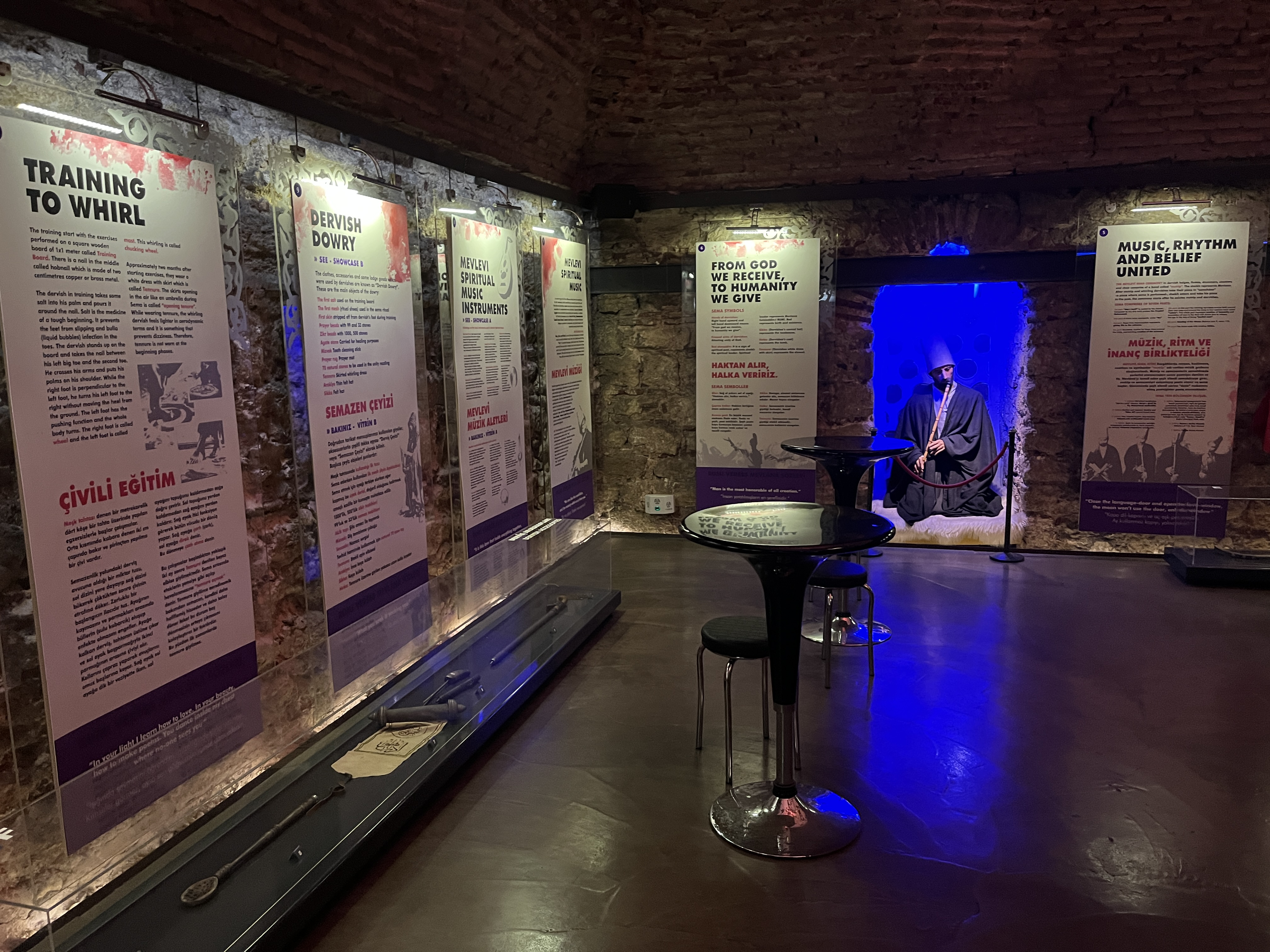
Interior

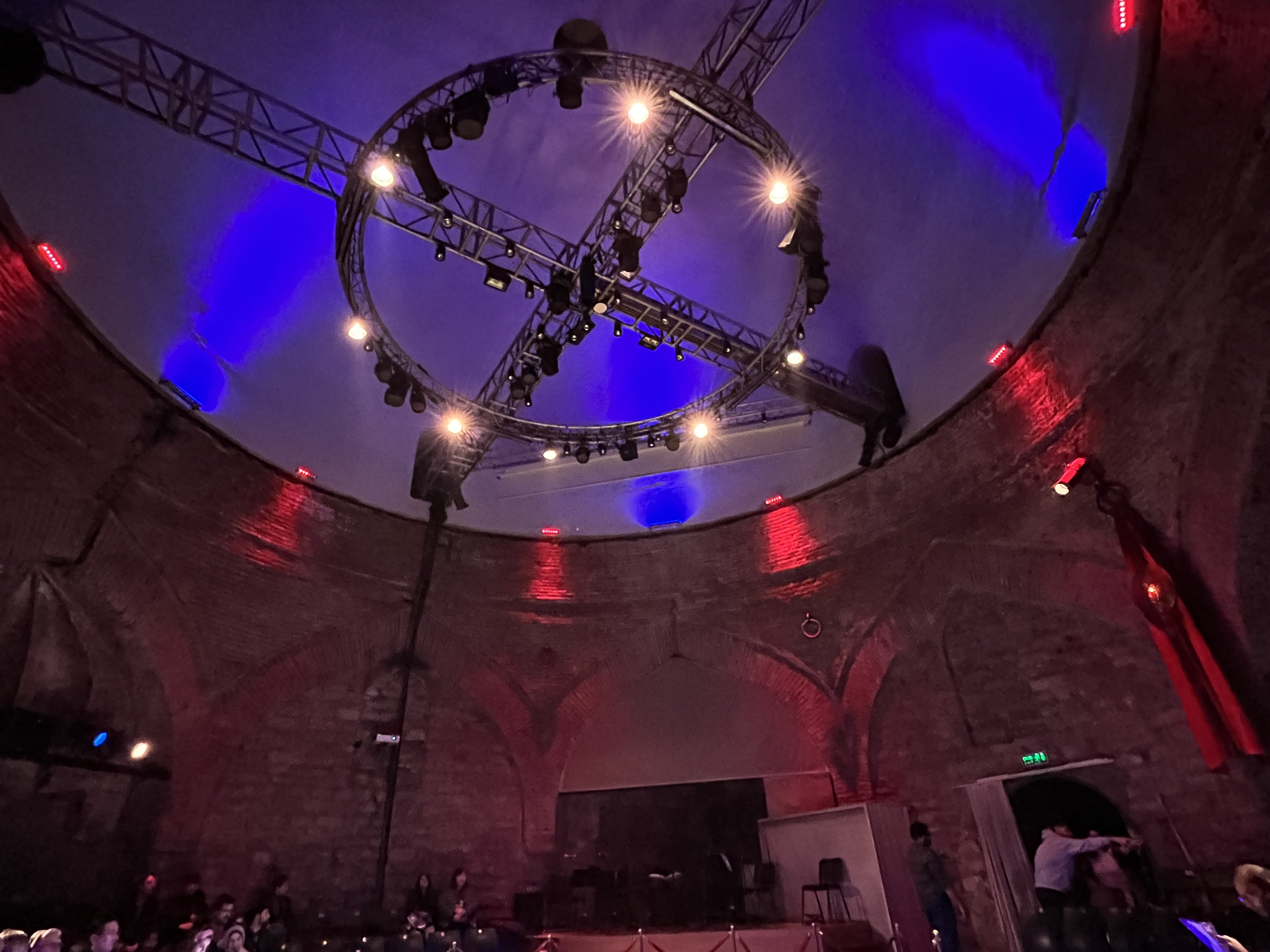
Interior ceiling

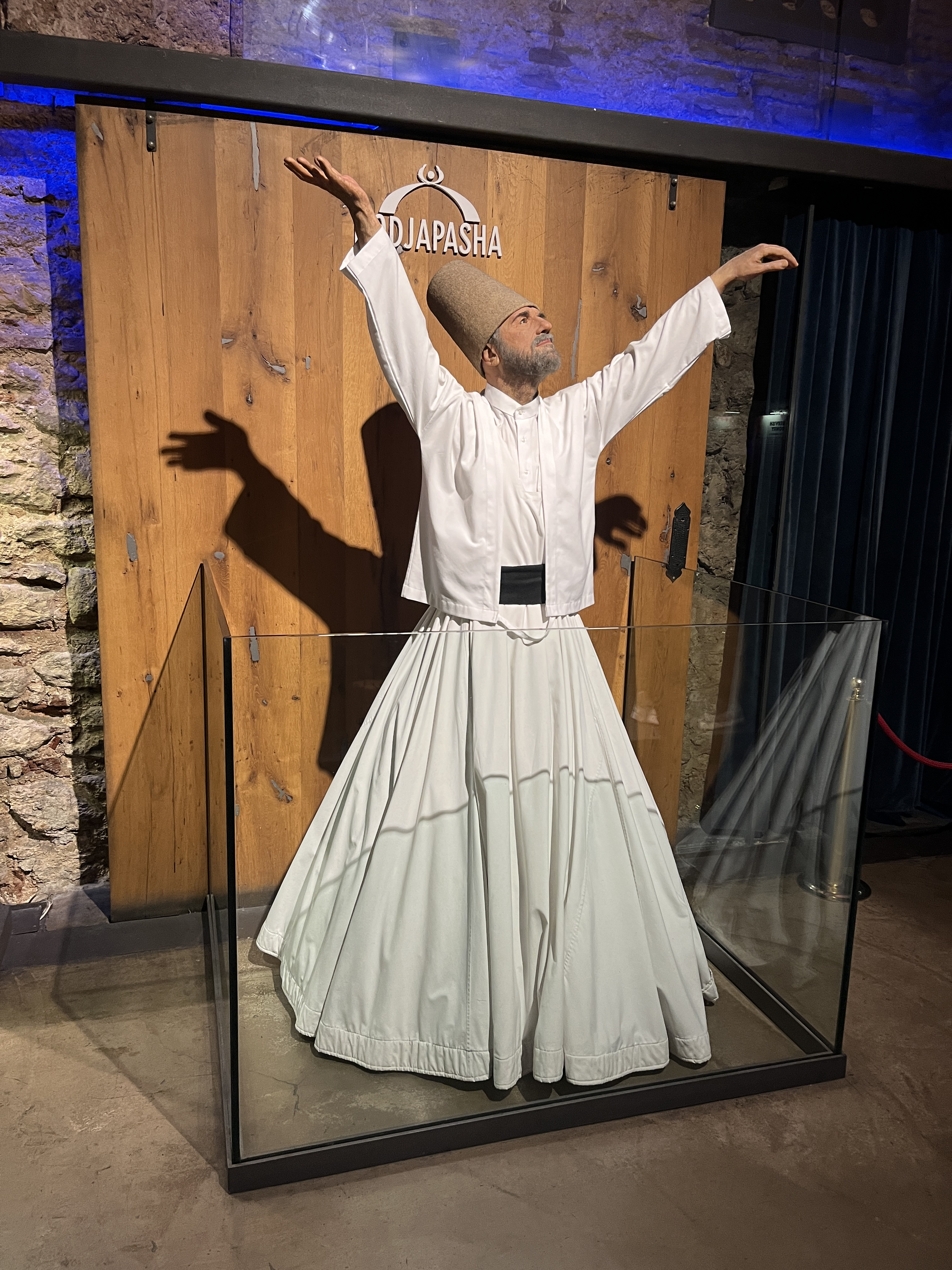
Exhibit

== See also ==
- Mevlevi Order
