= Sufi whirling =

Sufi meditation, practiced by Dervish orders, involving spinning in circles to music

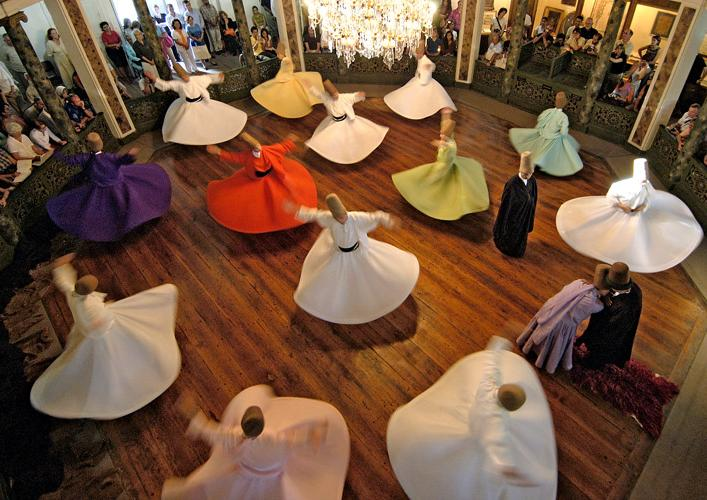
Whirling Dervishes in Istanbul, Turkey

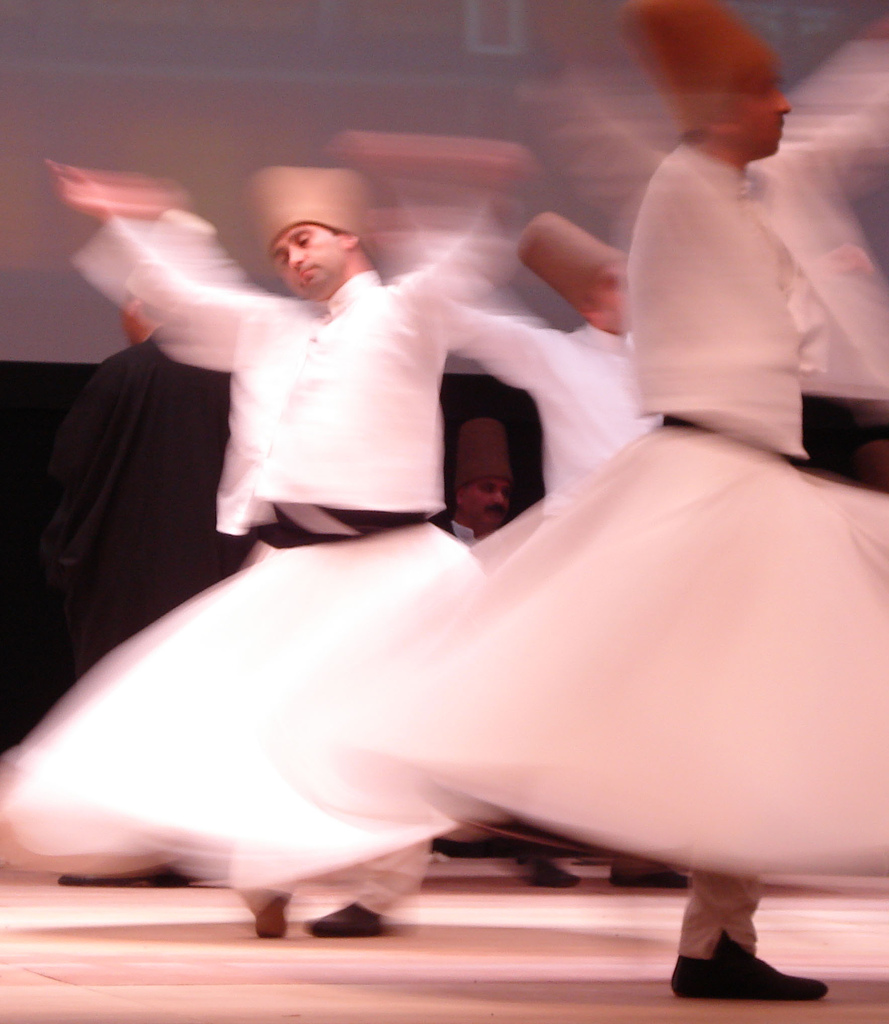
Whirling Dervishes, at Rumi Fest 2007

Sufi whirling (or Sufi turning) (Turkish: Semazen borrowed from Persian Sama-zan, Sama, meaning listening, from Arabic, and zan, meaning doer, from Persian) is a form of physically active meditation which originated among certain Sufi groups, and which is still practiced by the Sufi dervishes of the Mevlevi order and other orders such as the Rifa'i-Marufi. It is a customary meditation practice performed within the sema, or worship ceremony, through which dervishes (from the Persian darvish درویش, also called semazens, from Persian سماعزن) aim to reach greater connection with Allah. This is sought through abandoning one's nafs, ego or personal desires, by listening to the music, focusing on God, and spinning one's body in repetitive circles, which has been seen as a symbolic imitation of planets in the Solar System orbiting the Sun.

The Mevlevi practice gave rise to an Egyptian form, tanoura, distinguished by the use of a multicolored skirt. This has also developed into a performance dance by non-Sufis, including dancers outside the Islamic world.

== Origin ==
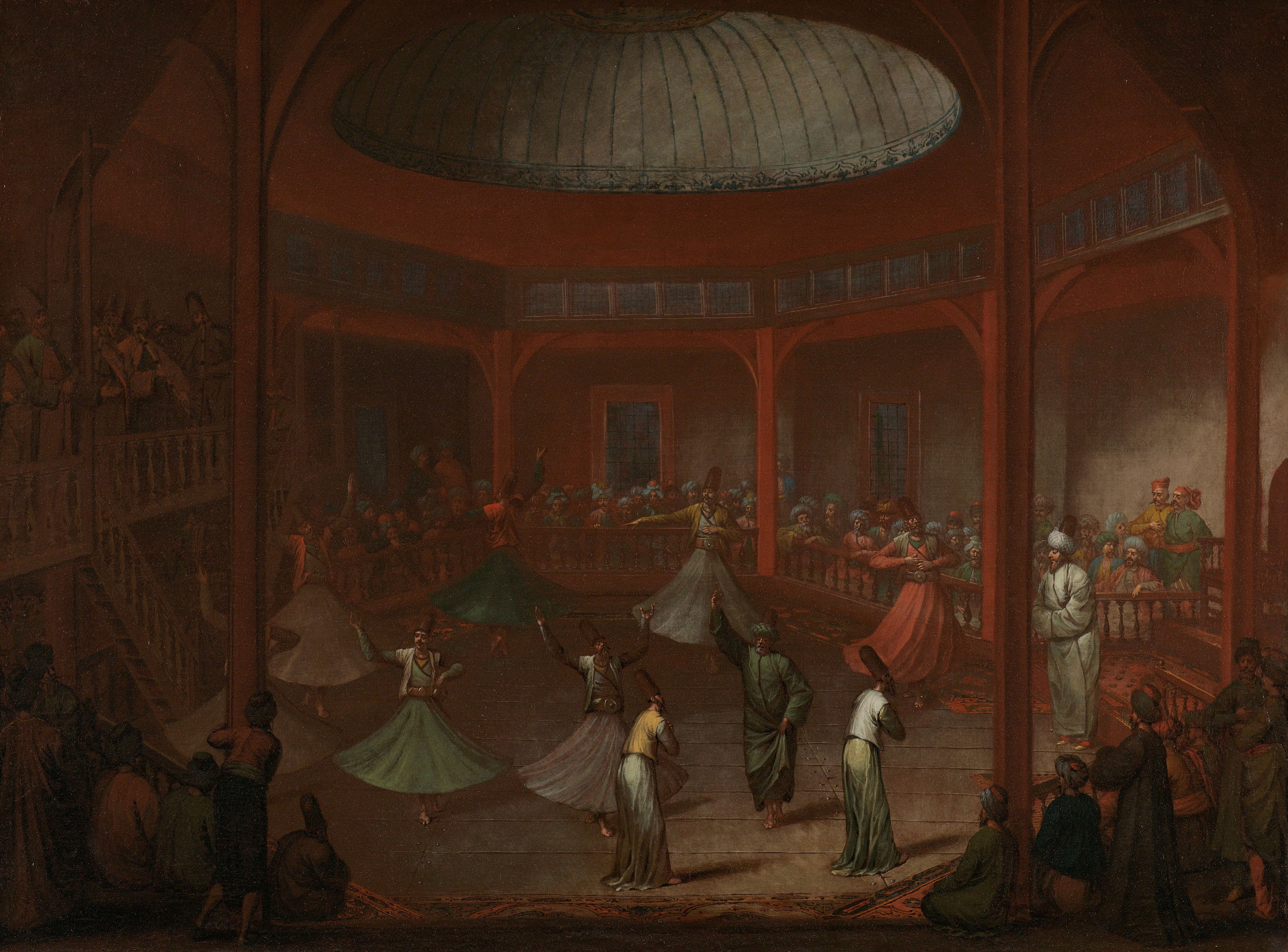
Mevlevi dervishes whirling in Pera by Jean-Baptiste van Mour

As an order, the whirling Dervishes were founded by mystic poet Rumi in the 13th century. Initially, Sufi fraternities (Arabic: طرائق, romanized: ṭarāʾiq) were organized as leaderships where members followed prescribed disciplines in service to a sheikh or master to establish trust with him. A member of such a fraternity is referred to as a Persian darwish. These turuk were responsible for organizing an Islamic expression of religious life, often founded by independent saints or resulted from the division of existing orders. Each Sufi tariqa stems from a unique silsila, or "chain of order" in which a member must learn, as the silsila binds each member to Allah through one's chain of order. One's silsila extends through the member's individual teacher, to their teacher and so on, through time until one is connected to the Prophet and thus Allah. The Prophet himself is revered as the originator of Sufism, which has in turn been traced down through a series of saints.

== Practice ==
A dervish practices multiple rituals, the primary of which is the dhikr, a remembering of Allah. The dhikr involves recitation of devotional Islamic prayer. This dhikr is coupled with physical exertions of movement, specifically dancing and whirling, in order to reach a state assumed by outsiders to be one of "ecstatic trances". As explained by Sufis:

In the symbolism of the Sema ritual, the semazen's camel's hair hat (sikke) represents the tombstone of the ego; his wide, white skirt (tennure) represents the ego's shroud. By removing his black cloak (hırka), he is spiritually reborn to the truth. At the beginning of the Sema, by holding his arms crosswise, the semazen appears to represent the number one, thus testifying to god's unity. While whirling, his arms are open: his right arm is directed to the sky, ready to receive god's beneficence; his left hand, upon which his eyes are fastened, is turned toward the earth. The semazen conveys god's spiritual gift to those who are witnessing the Sema. Revolving from right to left around the heart, the semazen embraces all humanity with love. The human being has been created with love in order to love. Mevlâna Jalâluddîn Rumi says, "All loves are a bridge to Divine love. Yet, those who have not had a taste of it do not know!"

Among the Mevlevi order, the practice of dhikr is performed in a traditional dress: a tennure, a sleeveless white frock, the destegul, a long sleeved jacket, a belt, and a black overcoat or khirqa to be removed before the whirling begins. As the ritual dance begins, the dervish dons a felt cap, a sikke, in addition to a turban wrapped around the head, a trademark of the Mevlevi order. The sheikh leads the ritual with strict regulations. To begin,

The sheikh stands in the most honored corner of the dancing place, and the dervishes pass by him three times, each time exchanging greetings, until the circling movement starts. The rotation itself is on the left foot, the center of the rotation being the ball of the left foot and the whole surface of the foot staying in contact with the floor. The impetus for the rotation is provided by the right foot, in a full 360-degree step. If a dervish should become too enraptured, another Sufi, who is in charge of the orderly performance, will gently touch his frock in order to curb his movement, The dance of the dervishes is one of the most impressive features of the mystical life in Islam, and the music accompanying it is of exquisite beauty, beginning with the great hymn in honor of the Prophet (na't-i sharif, written by Jalaluddin himself) and ending with short, enthusiastic songs, some things sung in Turkish.

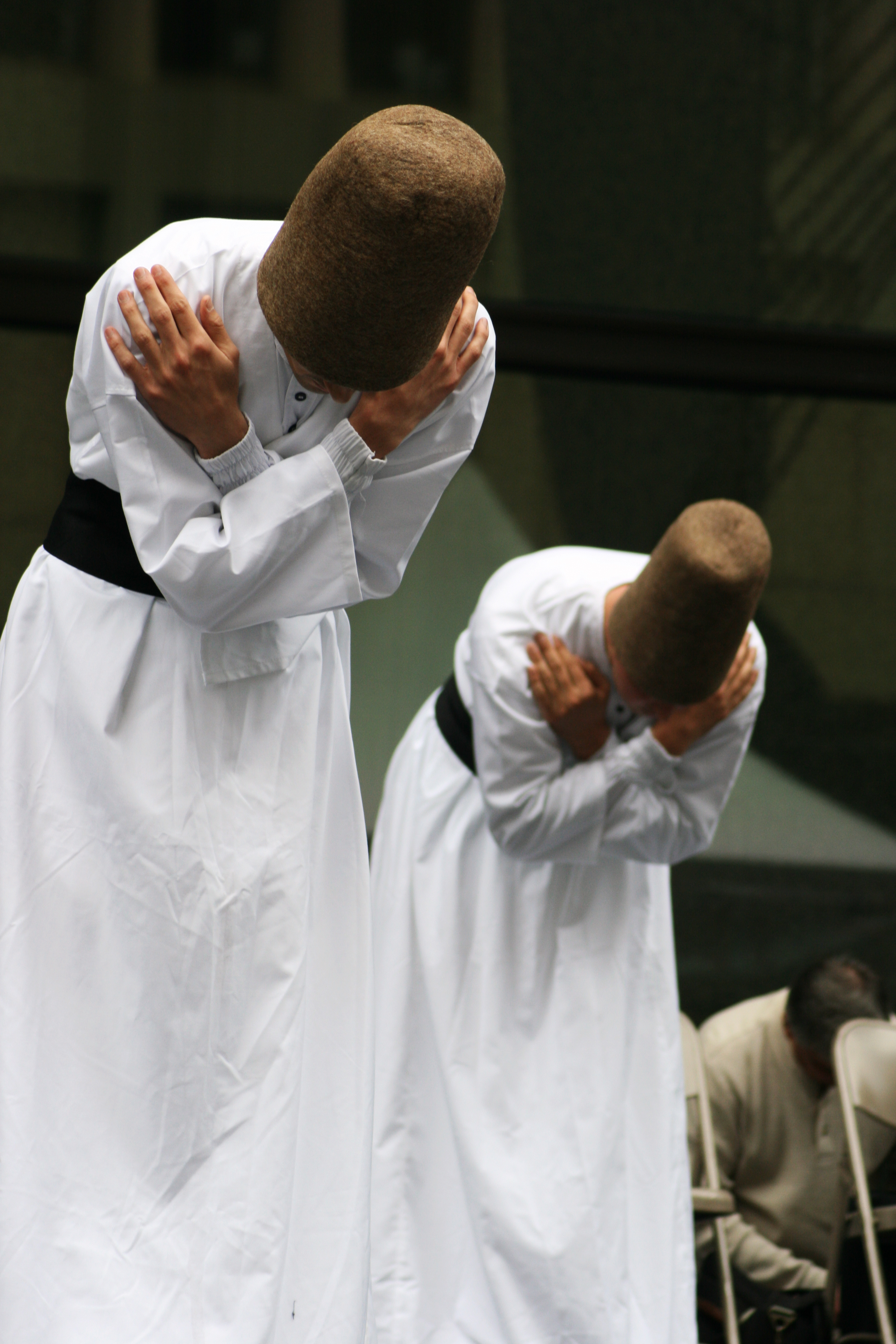
Turkish whirling dervishes of Mevlevi Order, bowing in unison during the Sema ceremony

The Western world, having witnessed Sufi whirling through tourism, have described the various forms of dhikr as "barking, howling, dancing, etc." The practice of each tariqa is unique to its individual order, specific traditions and customs may differ across countries. The same tariqa in one country will not mirror that of another country as each order's ritual stresses "emotional religious life" in various forms. The Mevleviyah order, like many others, practice the dhikr by performing a whirling meditation. Accompanying the dhikr practices of whirling and prayer, the custom of sama serves to further one's "nourishment of the soul" through devotional "hearing" of the "'subtle' sounds of the hidden world or of the cosmos." In contrast to the use of sama, whirling and devotional prayer in the practice of dhikr, the tariqa orders perform Sufi whirling in addition to playing musical instruments, consuming glowing embers, live scorpions and glass, puncturing body parts with needles and spikes, or practicing clairvoyance and levitation. The dervish practice can be performed by community residents or lay members, members have typically been those of lower classes. Women were received into a tariqa order by a male sheikh, but traditionally were instructed to practice the dhikr alone or with an established branch of females within a specific order.

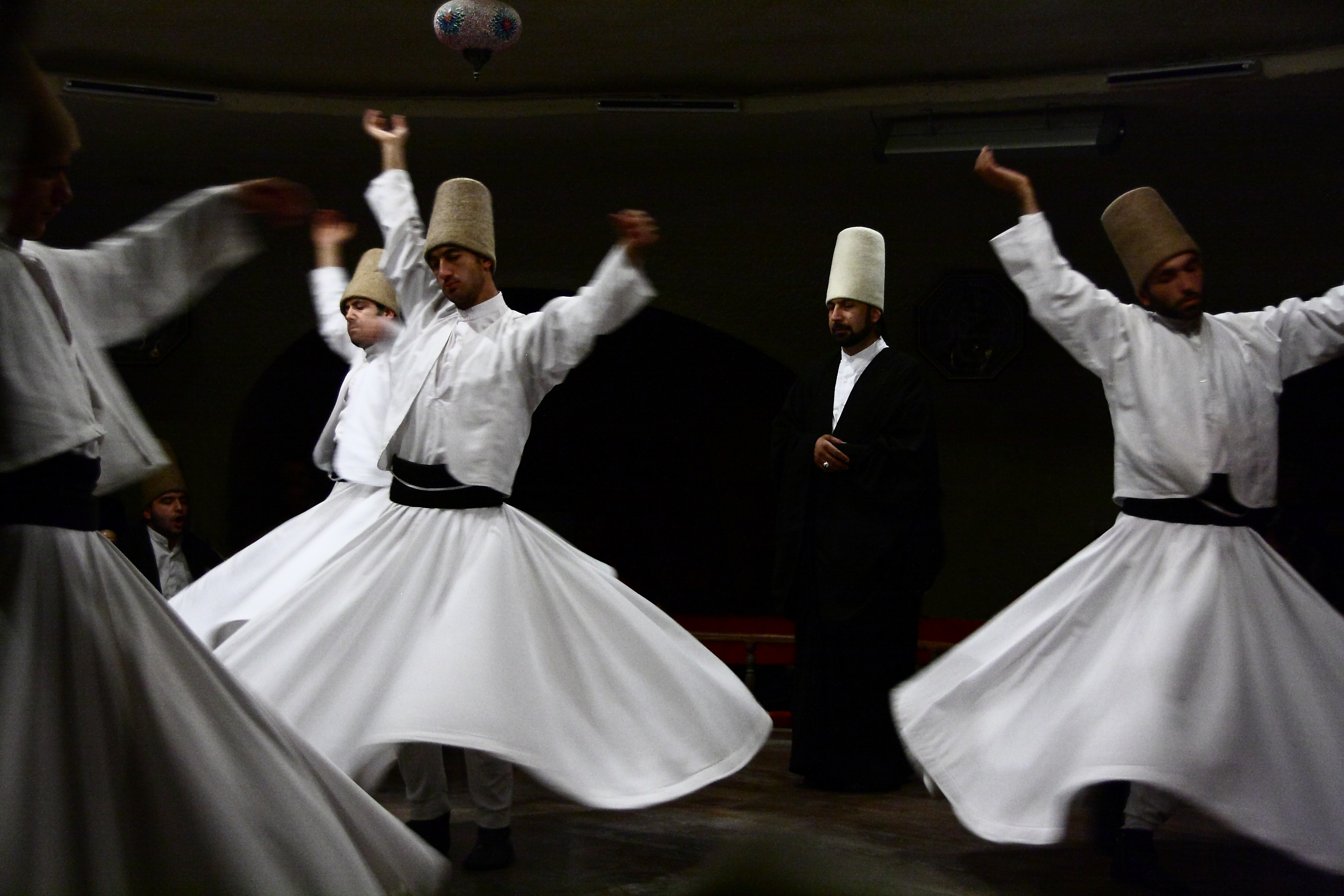
Semâ ceremony at the Dervishes Culture Center at Avanos, Turkey

The custom of sama among Sufi orders has a history of controversy within the Islamic faith. In one argument, the use of the term sama is considered to suggest physically "listening" in a spiritual context. A differing opinion argues that sama is in fact "hearing", as "to hear" can pertain to any sound in addition to any "subtle" sounds of the spiritual realm. Those in support of sama further claim that the term is actually synonymous with "understanding" and therefore recognition and application of the Revelation as well as the act of "attaining higher knowledge." Sama can also refer to considerate listening to an honest temporal leader who ensures social justice and makes word of God mainstream. The spread of sama among Sufi orders began some time around the mid third/ninth century C.E. in Baghdad, eventually finding acceptance and favor in Persian, Turkish and Indian Islam. The custom of sama evolved in practice over time as it complemented Sufi dhkir, whirling and among some orders dancing and a meal. Rules of propriety and conditions were adopted upon the widespread concern surrounding the necessity of sama with the dhikr; in order to distinguish between entertainment and valuable spiritual practice, the sama was distinguished as heard from the ego, heart or spirit. Despite the application of rules, some sheikhs continued to limit or disapprove the practice of sama. While controversy continuously questioned the place of sama in Sufi orders, the music itself was not affected. More recently, the custom of sama is most commonly performed within a dhikr ceremony. Those in support of sama continue to argue that "according to that which it is not sama and dance which induce ecstasy, but ecstasy which arouses dance, or furthermore, that sama is only a revealing instrument and that it only supplies that which is brought to it by the hearer."

In 2005, UNESCO proclaimed the "Mevlevi Sema Ceremony" of Turkey as one of the Masterpieces of the Oral and Intangible Heritage of Humanity.

== Today ==
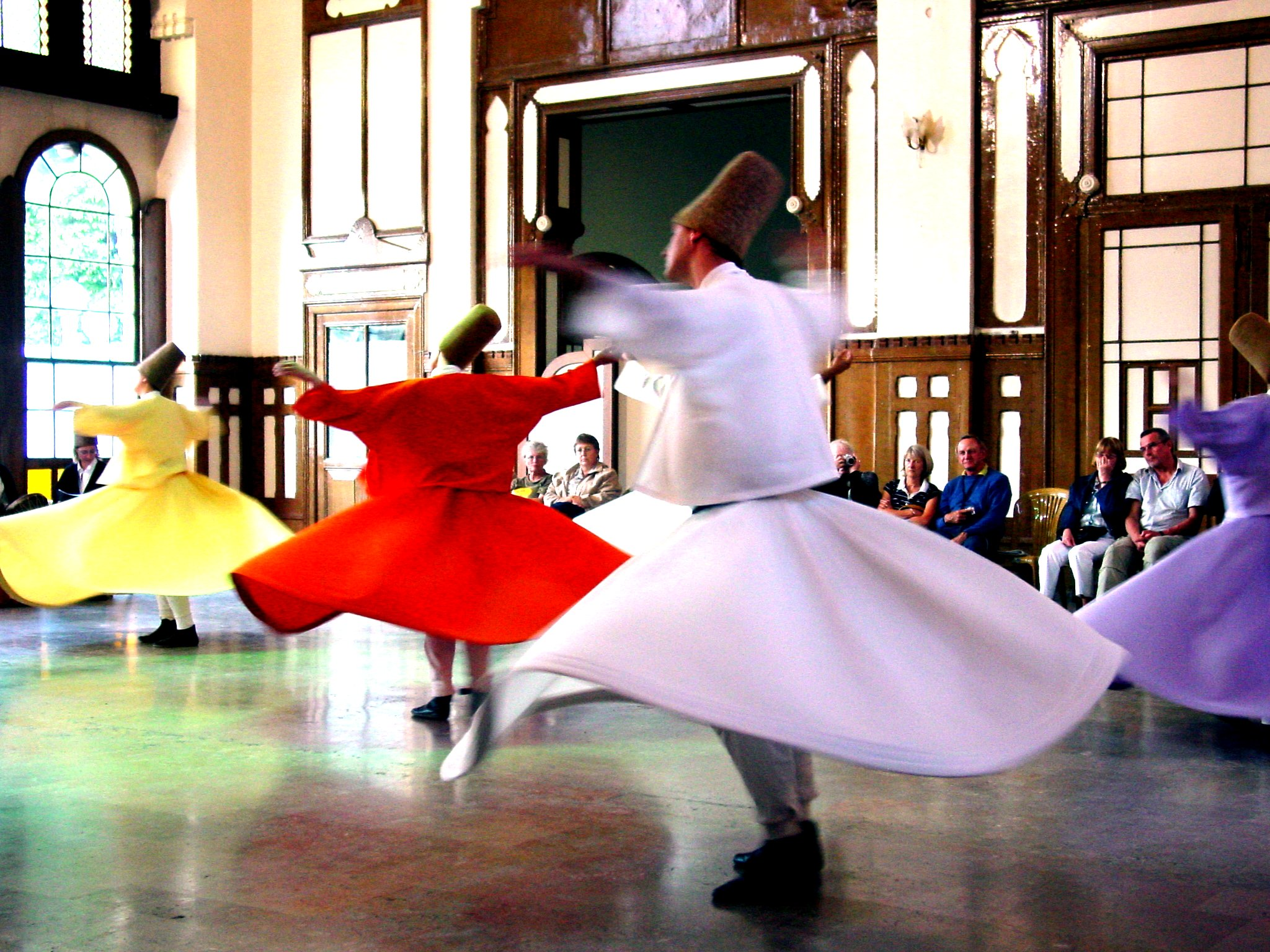
Sema ceremony at Sirkeci Railway Station, Istanbul

Dervish communities, in the Middle Ages, served a central role in social, religious and political life throughout "central Islamic lands." Dervish orders were at one time much larger in size than they are today, as the government has taken control over most Dervish monasteries throughout this area. In 1925, Turkey ordered the dissolution of all Sufi fraternities by decree, the Mevlevi managed to survive among small villages throughout the Middle East. In 1954, the Turkish government granted the Mevlevi order a special permission to perform ritual whirling practices for tourists during two weeks each year. Outside of tourist entertainment, Orthodox theologians have now vocally discounted the Dervish practice resulting in faqirs, or wandering, mendicant dervishes throughout central Islamic regions. Despite strict government control over Dervish practices, the Mevleviyah order continued its existence in Turkey to this day.

While only men have historically been permitted to take part in the ceremony, some communities now allow women to participate.

== Regional and secular forms ==
=== Egyptian tanoura ===
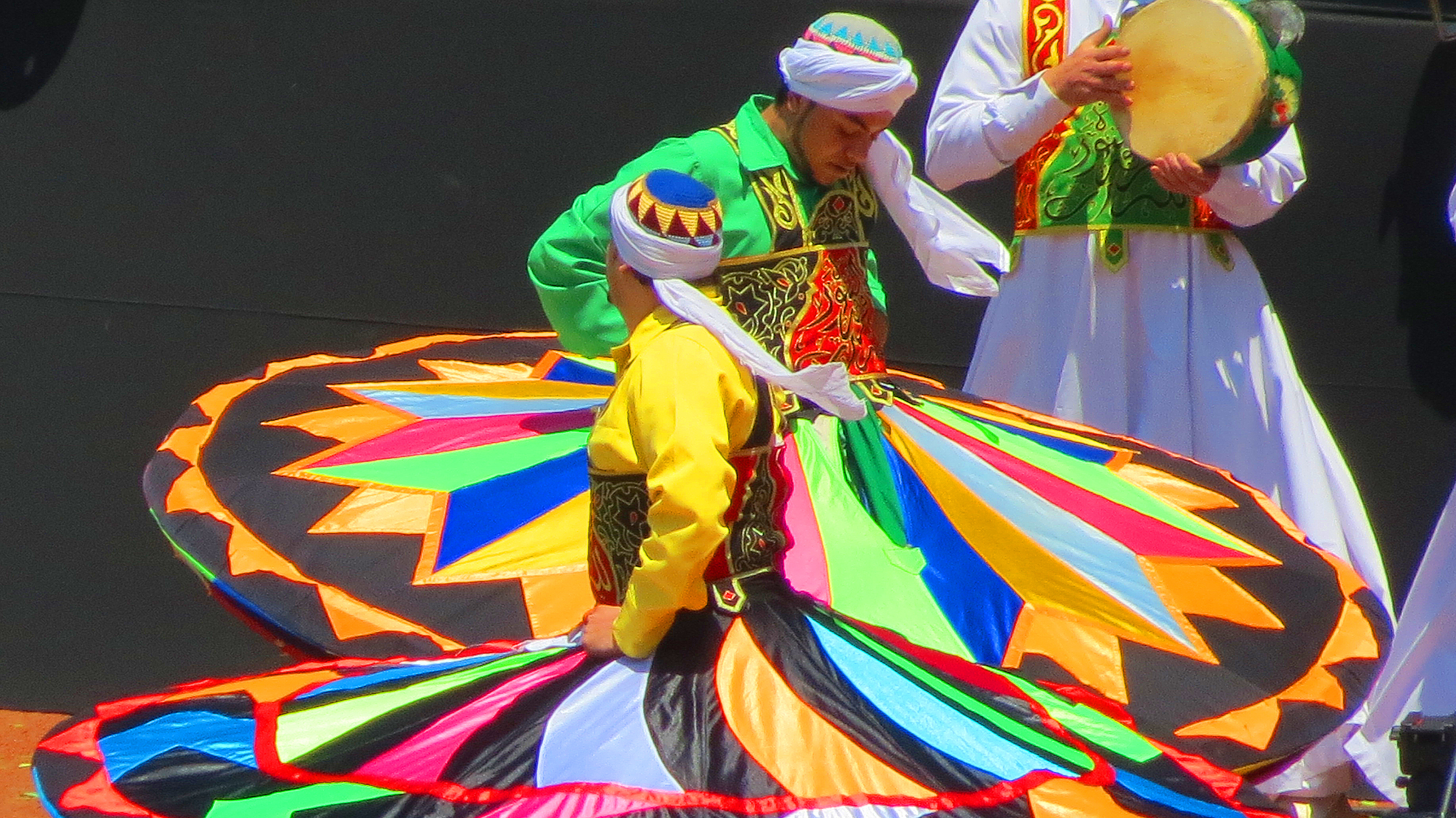
Egyptian tanoura dancers

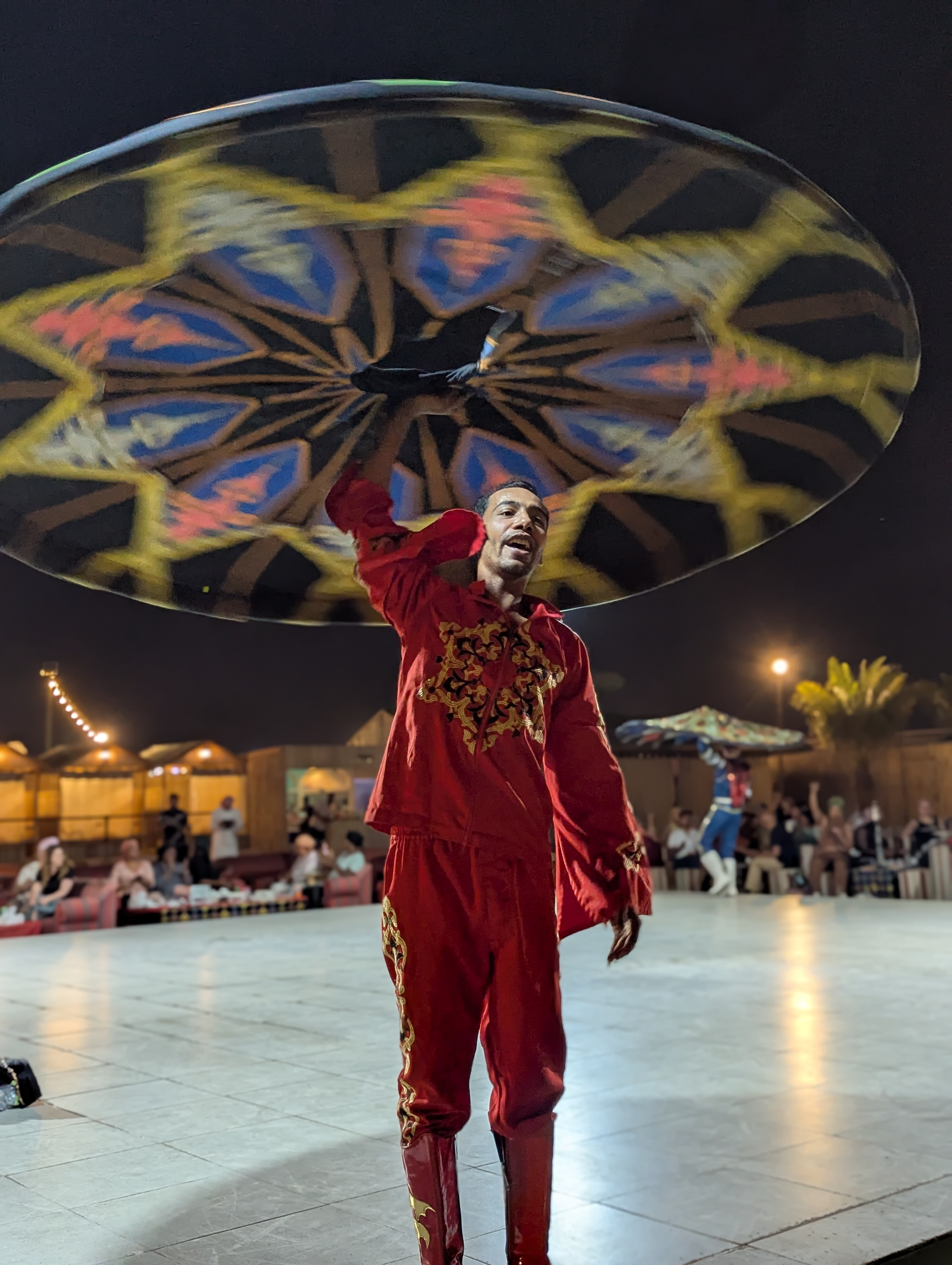
Tanoura dancer

In Egypt, the practice of whirling has been adapted as tanoura (Arabic: التنورة, romanized: el-tanoura). The word tanoura or tannoura refers to the colorful skirt worn by the whirler, with a color representing each Sufi order. The word may also refer to the dancer, traditionally a Sufi man. Tanoura is associated with Sufism and is performed at Sufi festivals, but it is also performed by non-Sufis as a folk dance or concert dance.

Although it is mainly used for visual effects, the dancers also augment their balance with the tanoura, through a dynamic centrifugal effect.

=== Pakistan ===
In Sufi shrines in Pakistan, such as the Lal shrine in Sehwan, Sindh, the practice of Sufi whirling is called Dhamaal and is performed to honor Sufi saints, or qalandars. Unlike the Turkish practice, Dhamaal may be practiced by any devotee – priests as well as pilgrims. Dhamaal is usually preceded by the beating of a drum (naghara) and ringing of bells, as pilgrims raise their hands, start to skip steps standing at one place and gradually work into a trance as the beats get faster. As the beats get faster, rhythms change and the drum beats are accompanies by the playing of shehnai.

Practitioners associate the dance with Lal Shahbaz Qalandar and with protests following the Battle of Karbala. They regard the rhythm of the drum to evoke the rhythm of the creation of the universe, as illustrated in the concept of Kun Fyakun.

=== In the West ===
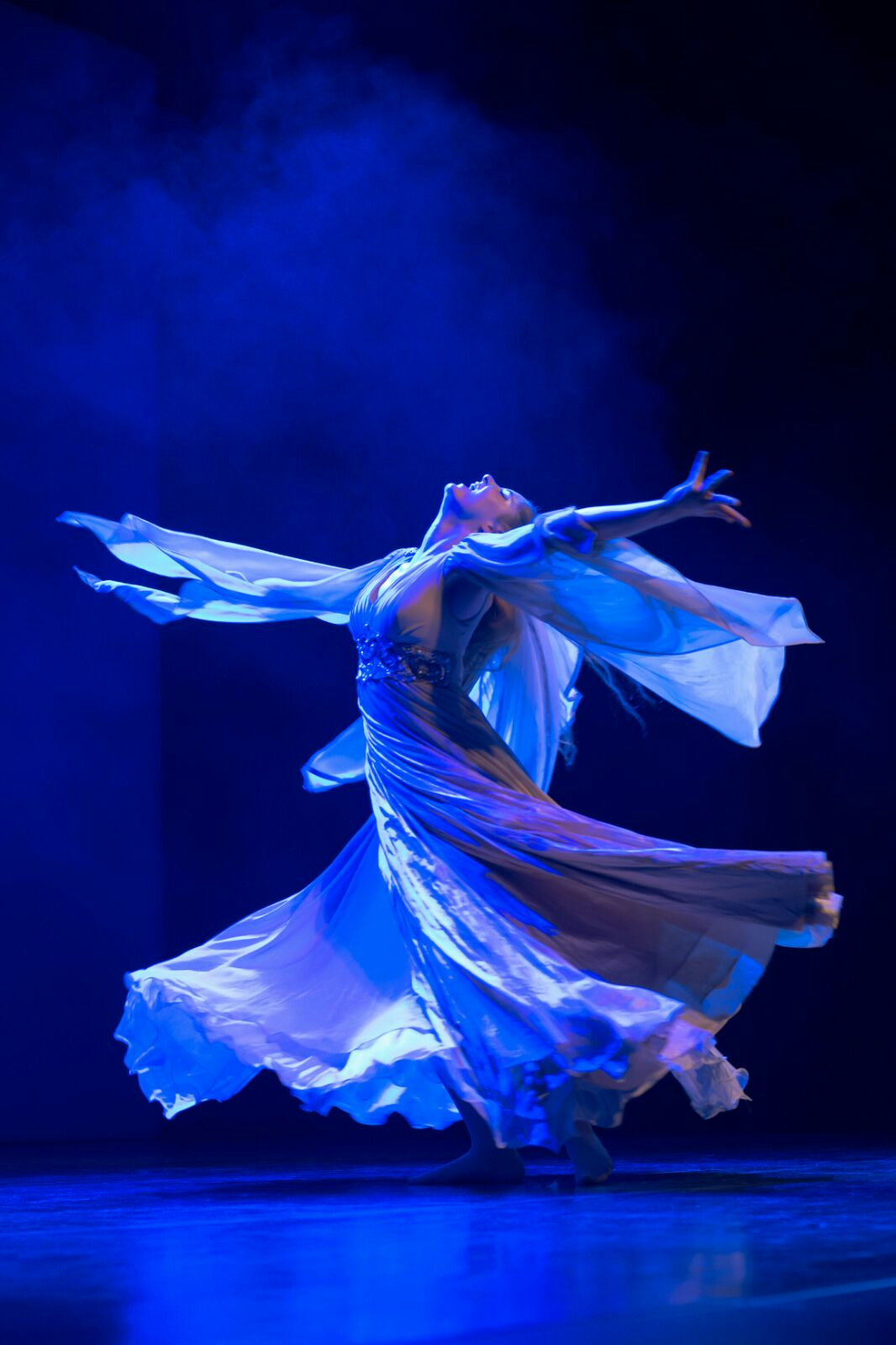
Whirling dancer, performing in a modern costume

The tanoura tradition has attracted some interest from Westerners in the belly dancing community. These performers include both men and women, solo and in groups. Such performances may be augmented with pyrotechnics or props, such as veils, wings and ribbons. The techniques used in Egyptian Tanoura can also be adopted by belly dancers to help with their balance and control dizziness.

Sufi whirling has also been promoted by actor and memoirist Annabelle Gurwitch as a form of stress relief.

== Physiology ==
A defining feature of whirling is continuous rotation (clockwise or counterclockwise) around a central radical axis while avoiding vertigo. In untrained dancers, this sustained rotation causes dizziness or motion-induced vertigo. Training for whirling targets the inner ear, which is responsible for balance functions in humans. To counteract this effect, whirling dance performers practice various balancing and psychological techniques.

== Records ==
Guinness World Records for "most Sufi whirls in one hour" were awarded in London in 2012, to Shafik Ibrahim Abd El Hamed in the male category with 2,905 rotations, and Tara Lee Oakley in the female category with 2,191. These records were surpassed in Zurich in 2015 by Nicole McLaren, with 3,552 rotations.

The longest continuous whirling performance has been recorded at more than four hours. The record for the most people simultaneously whirling is 755, set in Taiwan in 2011.

== See also ==
- Dhikr
- Islamic culture
- Nasheed
- Qawwali
- Religious experience
- Sogdian Whirl dance
- Sama (Sufism)
- Circle dance
