= Sikke =

Frisian male given name

Sikke, pron. [ˈsɪkə], is a fairly common West Frisian masculine given name. It developed from a reduced form or a hypocorism of Germanic names starting with Sigi- (meaning "victory"). Sikke is cognate with the German noun Sieg and the Dutch noun zege. It is also cognate with the Dutch masculine given name Sicco, which originated in the northeastern part of the Netherlands, in areas bordering the province of Friesland.

Because of the strong influence the Dutch language had (and continues to have) in Friesland, Frisian historic figures bearing the name Sikke became known as Sicco outside of Friesland. Such is the case with the diplomat Sicco van Goslinga, who was actually called Sikke. This was not an isolated development; the same thing happened with bearers of other Frisian names: the religious leader Menno Simons, for instance, was actually called Minne Simens.

In West Frisian, masculine given names can usually be adapted to equivalent feminine given names. In the case of Sikke, this is accomplished by dropping the voiceless final syllable and adding a diminutive suffix in its place (in this case -je), resulting in Sikje. This name, however, is extremely rare. A somewhat more usual modern feminine given name based on Sikke is Sikkelina.

== People named Sikke ==
Famous people with the name Sikke include:

- Sikke Douwes Sjaardema (1328-±1422), also called Sicco Sjaerdema, a Frisian nobleman and leader of the Schieringers
- Sicco van Goslinga (1664-1731), actually called Sikke van Goslinga, a Frisian nobleman, diplomat and politician
- Sikke Sleeswijk (1841-1908), a Frisian lawyer and judge
- Sikke Sibes Koldijk (1861-1927), a Frisian architect and poet
- Sikke Bruinsma (1889-1963), a Frisian sports shooter
- Sikke Smeding (1889-1967), a Frisian agricultural engineer
- Sikke Venema (1937-1999), a Frisian footballer
- Sikke Doele (1942-2002), a Frisian author and poet
