= Sama (Sufism) =

Sufi ceremony performed as part of the meditation and prayer

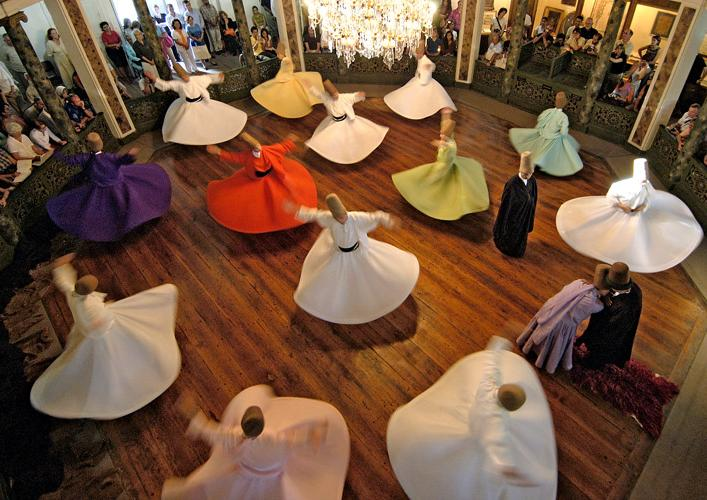
- Whirling Dervishes in Istanbul, Turkey
- Medium: Singing, playing instruments, dancing, recitation of poetry and prayers
- Originating culture: Sufi

Mevlevi Sema Ceremony
- UNESCO Intangible Cultural Heritage
- Country: Turkey
- Reference: 00100
- Region: Europe and North America

Inscription history
- Inscription: 2008 (3rd session)
- List: Representative

Sama, (Note: Turkish: Sema; Persian: سَماع, romanized: samā) literally Listening, is a Sufi ritual performed as part of the meditation and prayer practice known as Dhikr (in English, Remembrance [of God]). It is discussed by al-Ghazali in his The Alchemy of Happiness.

It is sometimes associated with Rumi, who is said to have fallen into an ecstatic trance after wandering through a city and hearing the name of God in the rhythmic hammering of a goldbeater (hence the name Sama, i.e. hearing/listening). As an imitation of this, Sama invites the practitioner to reflect on the all-encompassing presence of God, a concept known as tawhid.

Sama often includes singing, playing instruments, dancing, recitation of poetry and prayers, wearing symbolic attire, and other rituals. Sama is a particularly popular form of worship in Sufism.

In 2005, UNESCO confirmed the "Mevlevi Sama Ceremony" of Turkey as one of the Masterpieces of the Oral and Intangible Heritage of Humanity.

== Etymology ==
The term sama stems from the root-verb meaning acceptance by tradition, from which are derived the words سَمْع (sam‘^{un}) and اِسْتِمَاع (’istimā‘^{un}, listening), often paired with نَقْل (naql^{un}) and تَقْلِيد (taqlīd^{un}, tradition). It may have been in use since the tenth century to refer to a type of dhikr (remembrance of God), a ceremony used by various Sufi orders, particularly the Chishti order of the sub-continent. It often involves prayer, song and dance.

== Origin ==
The origination of Sama is credited to Rumi, Sufi master and creator of the Mevlevi Order. Outside of the Mevlevi Order, it has also been used by other Sufi orders drawing inspiration from Rumi.

The story of the creation of this unique form of dhikr is that Rumi was walking through the town marketplace one day when he heard the rhythmic hammering of the goldbeaters. It is believed that Rumi heard the dhikr, لا إله إلا الله "la ilaha ilallah" or in English, "There is no god but Allah" in the apprentices beating of the gold and was so entranced in happiness he stretched out both of his arms and started spinning in a circle (sufi whirling). With that the practice of Sama and the dervishes of the Mevlevi order were born.

Similarly, Abu Sa`id, (357 A.H.) (967 C.E.) was born in Mayhana, a town near Sarakhs, in Iran, bordering Turkmenistan. He is noted for establishing a rule for conduct in the khanaqah and also for the introduction of music (sama'), poetry and dance, as part of the Sufi collective devotional ritual of dhikr.

== Current practice ==
=== Mevlevi ===
The Whirling Dervishes of the Mevlevi order are probably the best-known practitioners of Sama. Mevlevi practitioners of sema are adult initiates into the order, which historically only meant men. Participants move as a group in a circle while also turning individually.

Art is "self expression" and Sama is "selfless expression" - an experience of "fanaa". Fanaa (Arabic: فناء fanāʾ ) in Sufism is the "passing away" or "annihilation" of the self.

=== Alevi/Bektashi ===
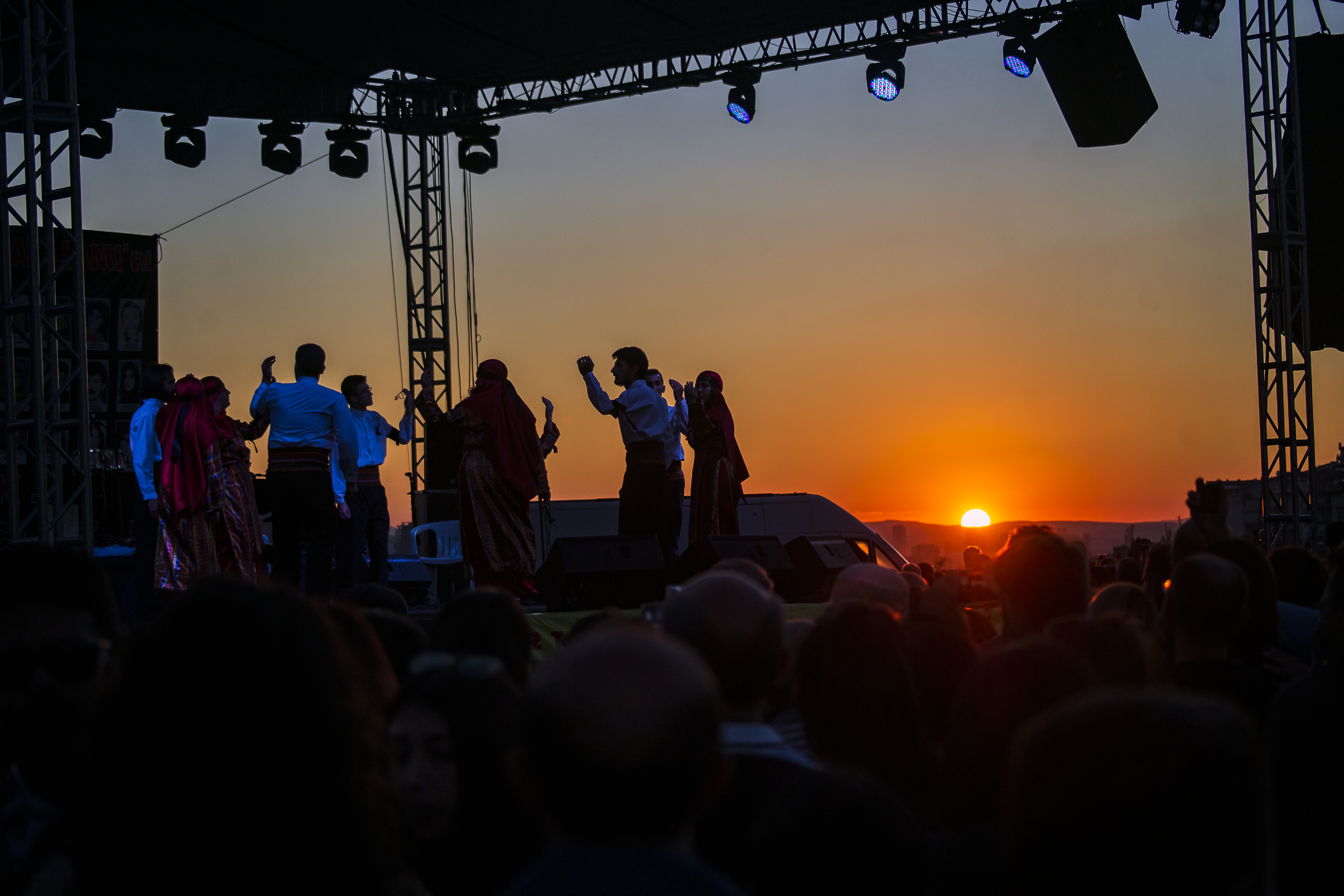
Alevi/Bektashi Sama

Sema is prominent in the ceremonies of the Alevi community of Turkey and the closely related Bektashi Order.

The most common forms of Alevi sema include kirklar semahı (sema of the forty) and turnalar semahı (crane sema). They are performed by both male and female teenagers, often in mixed groups, and participants turn facing each other in pairs or small groups and do not necessarily whirl as individuals. Many cemevleri (Alevi meetinghouses) have organized sema groups that perform at events such as the annual Hacı Bektaş Veli Festival.

=== Tannoura ===
In Egypt, the Mevlevi form of Sama is known as tannoura and has been adopted (with some modifications) by other Sufi orders as well. It is also performed as a folk and concert dance.

== Symbolism ==
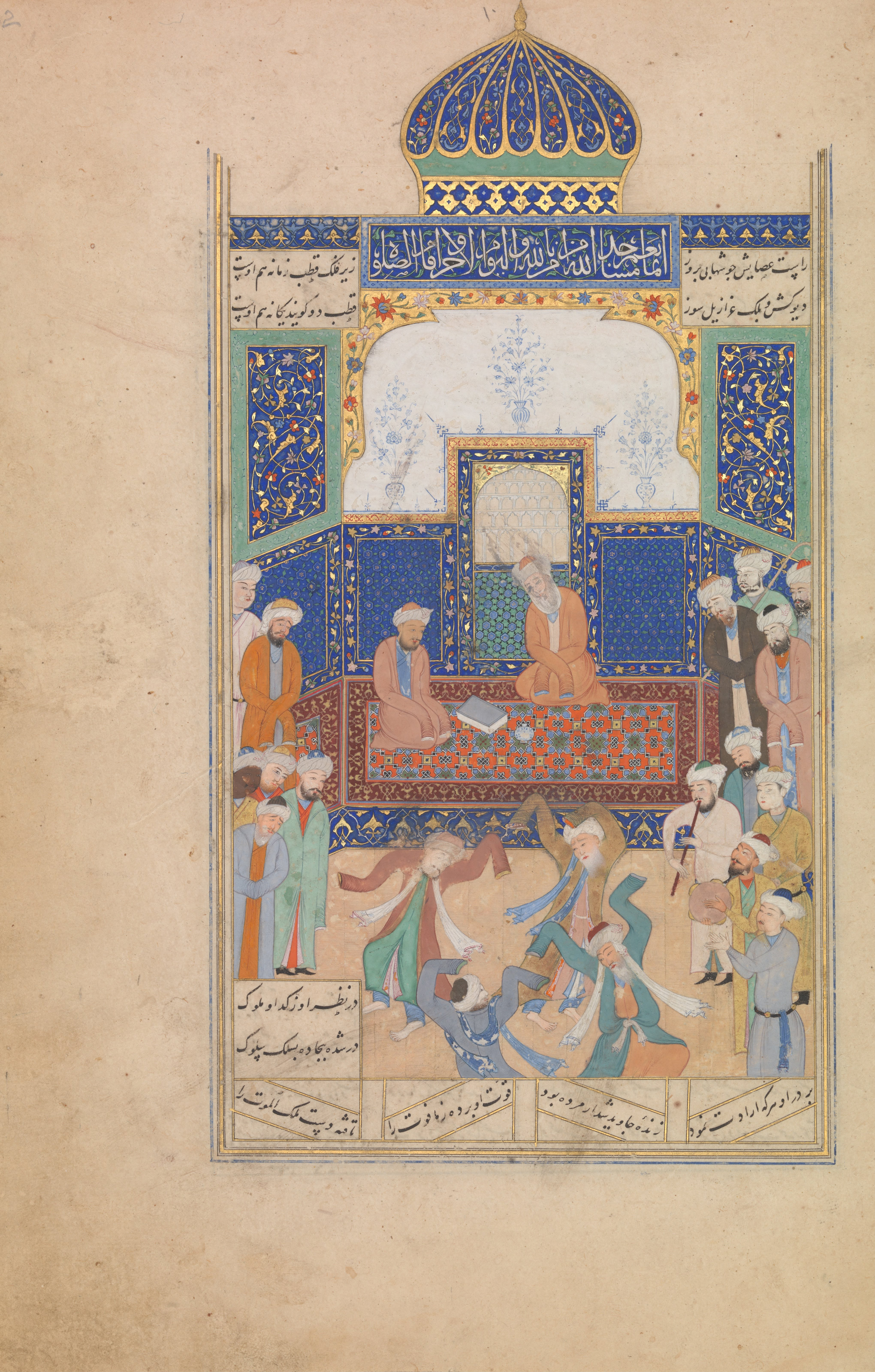
Sufis performing Sama before Shaykh Nizam al-Din Awliya. Miniature from the Timurid copy of the Khamsa of Amir Khusrau. Herat, 1485.

The Sama represents a mystical journey of man's spiritual ascent through mind and love to perfection. Turning towards the truth, the follower grows through love, deserts his ego, finds the truth and arrives at perfection. He then returns from this spiritual journey as a man who has reached maturity and a greater perfection, so as to love and to be of service to the whole of creation. Rumi has said in reference to Sama', "For them it is the Sama' of this world and the other. Even more for the circle of dancers within the Sama' who turn and have in their midst, their own Ka'aba." This relates Sama' to the pilgrimage to Mecca, in that both are intended to bring all who are involved closer to God.

== Components ==
Sama emphasizes singing, but also includes the playing of instruments, particularly for introductions and accompaniments. However, only instruments which are symbolic and not considered profane are used. The most common of these are the tambourine, bells, and flute. It often includes the singing of hymns, called qawl and bayt. Poetry is often included in the ceremony as well, because while it is inadequate by itself, it works together with aid in spiritual contemplation. Any poetry, even the erotic, can be applied to God, and thus used for this ceremony. However, the listener's heart must first be pure, or the dancing components of sama' will make these people full of lust instead of love for God. Additionally, being in love with a person rather than with God clouds a person's mind when they are listening to erotic poetry. Verses from the Qur'an are never used for this purpose, and not only because their meanings are said to be somewhat dulled through repetition. Qur'anic verses are never to be set to meditation, nor ornamented or improvised in any way, so that they remain sacred texts.

== Purpose ==
Sama is a means of meditating on God through focusing on melodies and dancing. It brings out a person's love of God, purifies the soul, and is a way of finding God. This practice is said to reveal what is already in one's heart, rather than creating emotions. All of a person's doubt disappears, and the heart and soul can communicate directly with God. The immediate goal of sama' is to reach wajd, which is a trance-like state of ecstasy. Physically, this state may include various and unexpected movements, agitation, and all types of dancing. Another state that people hope to reach through sama' is khamra, which means "spiritual drunkenness". Ultimately, people hope to achieve the unveiling of mysteries and gain spiritual knowledge through wajd. Sometimes, the experience of wajd becomes so strong that fainting or even, in extreme circumstances, death, occurs.

== Etiquette ==
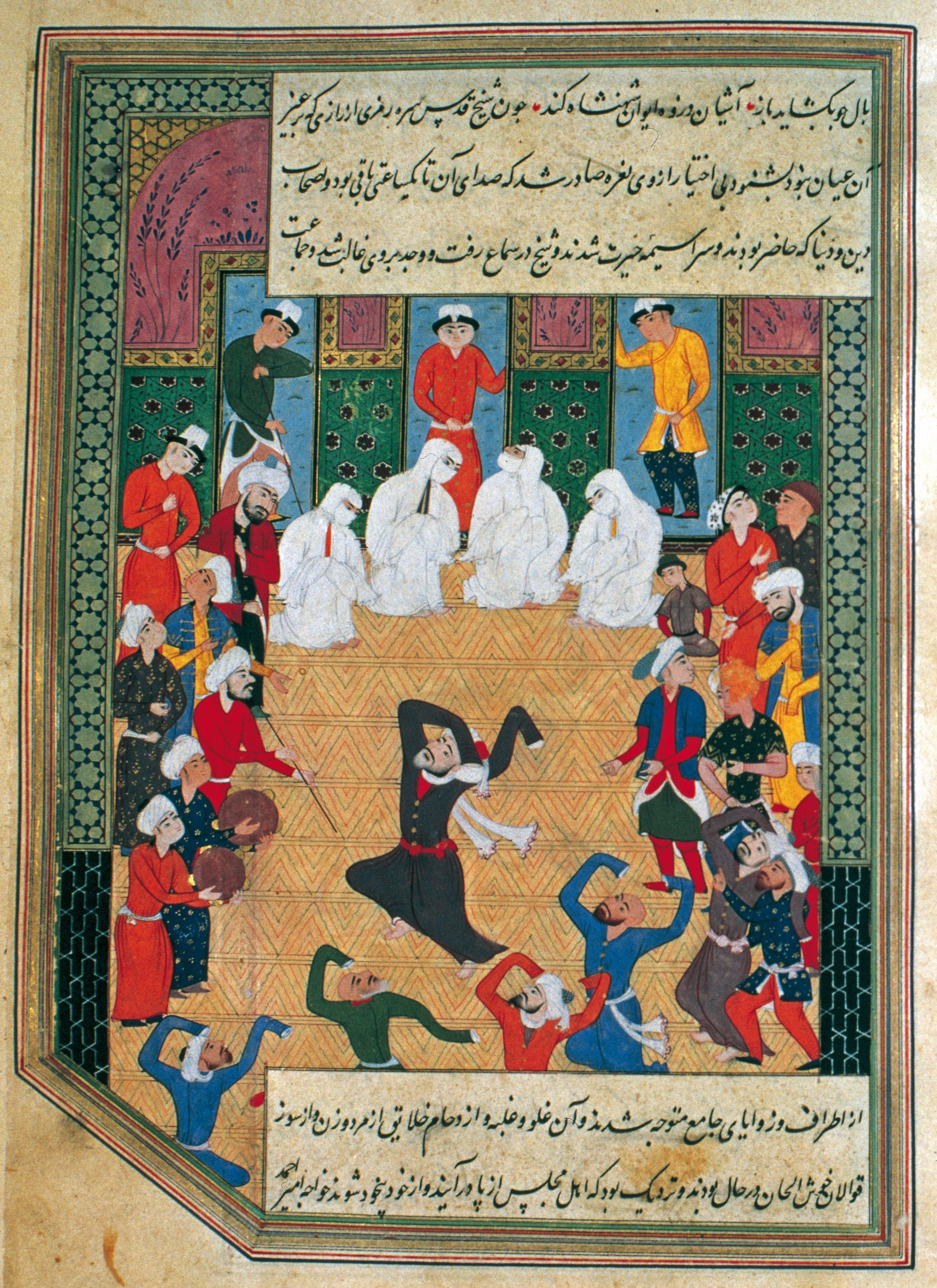
Shaykh Safi dancing in a sama. Ṣafvat al-Ṣafā ("life of Shaykh Ṣafī al-Dīn"), by Ismāʿil bin Bazzāz, completed in September 1582 in Shirāz

Participants in sama are expected to remain silent and still, and controlled throughout the ceremony, unless wajd occurs. This way, a higher degree of spiritual contemplation can be reached. Participants must restrain themselves from movement and crying until they reach a point in which they can no longer hold back. At this point, wajd can be reached. It is essential that the trance-like experience of wajd be genuine and not faked for any reason. Also, people must maintain proper intent and actions must be present throughout the sama'; otherwise, they cannot experience the ceremony's intended positive effects.

== Controversy ==
Muslims hold divergent views on the issue of sama and the use of music in general. Opponents, particularly among Salafis and Wahhabis, are critical, while advocates (including Sufis among both Sunnis and Shias) support its use.

Advocates view chants as a required practice for spiritual growth. Al-Ghazzali wrote a chapter entitled "Concerning Music and Dancing as Aids to the Religious Life", where he emphasized how the practices of music and dance are beneficial to Muslims, as long as their hearts are pure before engaging in these practices.

Opponents find music a heretical innovation or bidah and associate it with infidelity. They compare the physical sensations experienced by a person in the state of wajd to a state of physical drunkenness, and therefore do not condone it.

== See also ==
- Qawwali - A form of sama in South Asia
- Hadhra - Arab Sufi dhikr
- Usul al-Sama - Treatise written on Sama by Fakhr al-Din Zarradi
- Sufi whirling
- Circle dance
