= Yalman (surname) =

Yalman is a Turkish name. Notable people with the surname include:

- Ahmet Emin Yalman (1888–1972), Turkish journalist
- Alp Yalman (born 1940), Turkish businessman
- Nur Yalman, Turkish social anthropologist
- Özlem Yalman (born 1977), Turkish basketball referee
