= Nur Yalman =

Turkish social anthropologist (1931–2026)

Nur Yalman (1931 – 4 June 2026) was a Turkish social anthropologist at Harvard University, where he was Professor of Social Anthropology and Middle Eastern Studies. He was the chairman and member of the board of trustees of Koç University.

== Life and career ==
Yalman completed his high school education from Robert College in Istanbul. For his BA and PhD, he studied Social Anthropology at Cambridge University under the mentorship of Edmund Leach and carried out fieldwork in Sri Lanka. At Cambridge, Yalman was a Bye-Fellow of Peterhouse, and subsequently joined the anthropology faculty at the University of Chicago. In 1960, during his time teaching at Middle East Technical University, Yalman also served as a Prime Ministry Special Advisor in the newly established State Planning Organization. During his stay at Chicago, he served as director for the Center for Middle Eastern Studies from 1968-1972. He then joined the Harvard University faculty in 1972. Yalman is also a fellow of the American Academy of Arts and Sciences. He also served on the Social Sciences jury for the Infosys Prize in 2010.

Although his first book, Under the Bo Tree, was on Sri Lankan kinship and marriage, he has since expanded his research to include religion and politics in Middle Eastern and Muslim cultures. Not only has he written about many countries of the world, he has also conducted ethnographic fieldwork in Sri Lanka, India, Iran and Turkey. Yalman’s varied research interests are expressed in the wide number of languages he speaks: Turkish, English, French, German, some Persian, Sinhalese, Italian and Arabic. He teaches courses on structuralist and post-structuralist theory and on issues of modernization and social change.

Yalman died in Istanbul on 4 June 2026, at the age of 95.

== Published works ==
- A Passage to Peace: Global Solutions from East to West. A Dialogue with Daisaku Ikeda. I.B. Tauris, 2009, ISBN 978-1-84511-923-2
- Under the Bo Tree: Studies in Caste, Kinship, and Marriage in the Interior of Ceylon. Berkeley, University of California Press, 1967.
- "On the Purity of Women in the Castes of Ceylon and Malabar," The Journal of the Royal Anthropological Institute of Great Britain and Ireland, Vol. 93, No. 1 (Jan., 1963), pp. 25–58
- "On Land Disputes in Eastern Turkey" in Tikku, Girdhari L., and Von Grunebaum, G. E. Islam and its cultural divergence; studies in honor of Gustave E. von Grunebaum, edited by Girdhari L. Tikku, University of Illinois Press Urbana, 1971
- "De Tocqueville in India: An Essay on the Caste System," Man, New Series, Vol. 4, No. 1 (Mar., 1969), pp. 123–131
- "The Structure of Sinhalese Healing Rituals," The Journal of Asian Studies, Vol. 23, Aspects of Religion in South Asia (Jun., 1964), pp. 115–150
