= Center for Middle Eastern Studies at the University of Chicago =

US research center

Coordinates: 41.788997°N 87.598278°W

- Abbreviation: CMES
- Formation: 1965
- Type: National Resource Center
- Location: Chicago
- Director: Alireza Doostdar
- Website: cmes.uchicago.edu

The Center for Middle Eastern Studies at the University of Chicago is a National Resource Center for the study of a region extending from Morocco in the West to Kazakhstan in the East. As a result, this Area Center covers some of the most important and controversial regions - including North Africa, the Middle East, and Central Asia. Prior to the Center's formation, scholars originally received funding administered by Title VI of the US Department of Defense's National Defense Education Act. The University of Chicago did not form its center until 1965, well after the administration of funding was moved to the US Department of Education by President John F. Kennedy. This area center consistently ranks in the highest tier of those dealing with Middle Eastern studies in the United States according to US Department of Education and external reviews. In the most recent competition for Department of Education's Title VI funds in 2014, the Center was awarded both NRC (National Resource Center) and FLAS (Foreign Language and Area Studies) grants, which support courses, extracurricular programs, educational outreach, and graduate student fellowships.

== Center functions ==
The primary function of the Center is to stimulate and coordinate research and teaching about the Middle East region across the University, regardless of discipline. This is accomplished informally in the social atmosphere of the Fazlur Rahman Common Room and in formal settings, such as the Center's lectures, conferences, symposia, and panel discussions. The Center also serves the general public by providing free educational resources and organizing professional development programs for local educators.

== Masters of arts program ==
The Center administers a two-year terminal master's degree through either the Division of Humanities or the Division of Social Science, wherein a student may structure his or her own course of study in such areas as contemporary Middle Eastern studies, Middle Eastern history, Islamic studies, Islamic art and archaeology, and Arabic, Persian, Hebrew, or Turkic languages (Anatolian Turkish, Uzbek, Kazakh), and their accompanying literatures. With over fifty first- and second-year students across two academic tracks, the MA program is one of the largest of its kind in the United States.

Additionally, the Center offers a series of joint Masters of Arts programs. These include:

M.A. in Middle Eastern Studies/Masters in Business Administration - in conjunction with the University of Chicago Booth School of Business

M.A. in Middle Eastern Studies/Masters in Public Policy - offered with the Irving B. Harris School of Public Policy Studies at the University of Chicago

== Current staff ==
- Director: Alireza Doostdar
- Associate Director: Thomas E.R. Maguire
- Deputy Director - Academic Programs: Paul Walker

== Former directors ==
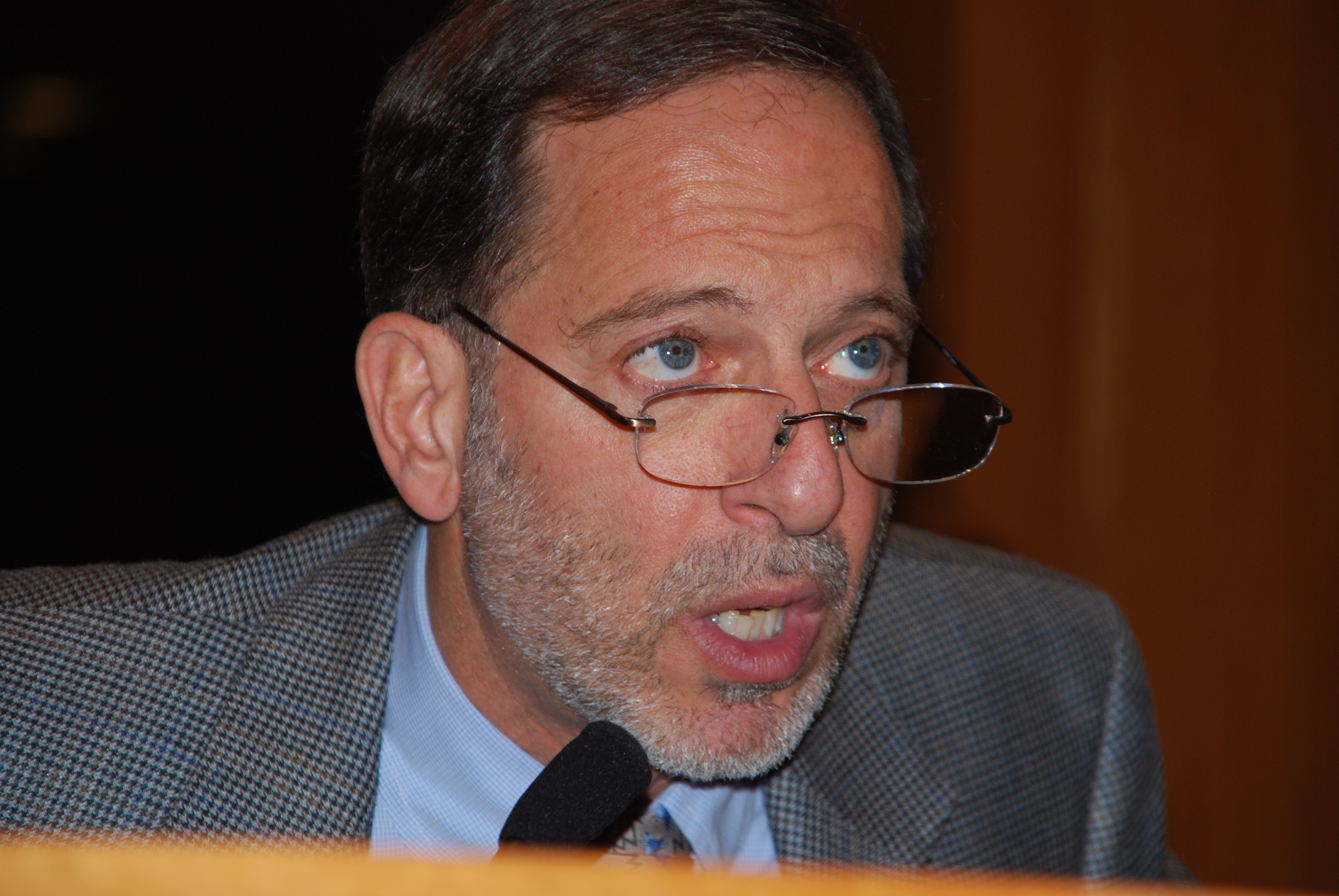
Rashid Khalidi lead the center between 1991 and 1995

- Alireza Doostdar: 2023–Present
- Orit Bashkin: 2017-2018, 2020-2023
- Hakan Karateke: 2014-2017
- Fred Donner: 2009-2014
- Holly Shissler: 2007-2009,2019-2020
- Martin Stokes: 2004-2007
- John Woods: 1998-2004
- Cornell Fleischer: 1995-1998
- Rashid Khalidi: 1991-1995
- John Woods: 1985-1991
- Richard Chambers: 1979-1985
- Marvin Zonis: 1976-1979
- Leonard Binder: 1973-1976
- Nur Yalman: 1968-1972
- William R. Polk: 1965-1968
