= Girdhari L. Tikku =

Giridhari (Giri) Lal Tikku (18 August 1925 in Kashmir-14 August 1996) was a Kashmiri linguist and literary scholar and Professor of Persian and Asian Studies at the University of Illinois. He was known for his works on Persian literature.

== Works ==
- A conversation with modern Persian poets
- In confidence: dreams and dialogues
- Islam and its cultural divergence: studies in honor of Gustave E. von Grunebaum
- Nineteen ten, Writers Workshop, 1981
- Persian poetry in Kashmir, 1339-1846: an introduction
