= Cornell Fleischer =

American historian (1950–2023)

- Occupation: Historian

Academic background
- Education: Brown University; Princeton University

Cornell Fleischer (October 23, 1950 – April 21, 2023) was an American historian and the Kanuni Süleyman Professor of Ottoman and Modern Turkish Studies at the University of Chicago.

== Education and career ==
The son of an American diplomat, Fleischer grew up in Germany, Egypt, Iraq, and California. He also lived in Turkey for nine years. He began his studies at Brown University before transferring to Princeton as a “critical language” undergraduate student to study Arabic. He continued in the Department of Near Eastern Studies for his Ph.D., completing his dissertation, “Gelibolulu Mustafa Âli Efendi, 1541–1600: A Study in Ottoman Historical Consciousness,” in 1982. This work formed the basis of his book, Bureaucrat and Intellectual in the Ottoman Empire: The Historian Mustafa Âli (Princeton University Press, 1986). Following the publication of this book he was awarded a MacArthur Fellowship in 1988. He was also the co-editor with Gülrü Necipoğlu and Cemal Kafadar of Treasures of Knowledge: An Inventory of the Ottoman Palace Library (1502/3–1503/4) (Brilll, 2019) and authored numerous articles.

Fleischer taught at Ohio State University and Washington University in St. Louis before joining the Departments of Near Eastern Languages and Civilizations and History at the University of Chicago in 1993. He later became the inaugural holder of the Kanuni Süleyman Chair in Ottoman and Modern Turkish Studies at Chicago. He was elected a member of the American Academy of Arts and Sciences in 1998 and was presented with the Order of Merit of the Republic of Turkey, Turkey’s highest civilian order, by President Gül. He was also a former director of the University of Chicago's Center for Middle Eastern Studies and a member of the editorial board of Historians of the Ottoman Empire.

== Publications ==
- Bureaucrat and Intellectual in the Ottoman Empire: The Historian Mustafa Âli (1541-1600). Princeton, NJ: Princeton University Press, 1986.
- Gülru Necipoğlu, Cemal Kafadar, and Cornell H. Fleischer (eds.), Treasures of Knowledge. An Inventory of the Ottoman Palace Library (1502/3-1503/4). 2 vols. Leiden: Brill, 2019.
- "From Şeyhzade Korkud to Mustafa Âli: Cultural Origins of the Ottoman Nasihatname," in IIIrd Congress on the Social and Political History of Turkey. Princeton University 24–26 August 1983, eds. Heath W. Lowry and Ralph S. Hattox (Istanbul: The Isis Press, 1990), 67-77.
- “The Lawgiver as Messiah: The Making of the Imperial Image in the Reign of Süleymân,” in Soliman le magnifique et son temps, ed. Gilles Veinstein. (Paris: Documentation française, 1992), 159-177.
- "Secretaries Dreams: Augury and Angst in the Ottoman Scribal Service," in Armagan: Festschrift fur Andreas Tietze (Prague, 1994).
- "Between the Lines: Realities of Scribal Life in the Sixteenth Century," in Studies in Ottoman History in Honour of V. L., eds. Colin Heywood and Colin Imber (Istanbul: The Isis Press, 1994), 45-61.
- “Seer to the Sultan: Haydar‑i Remmal and Sultan Süleyman,” in Cultural Horizons. A Festschrift in Honor of Talat S. Halman, ed. Jayne L. Warner (Syracuse: Syracuse University Press, 2001), 290‑304.
- “Shadows of Shadows: Prophecy in Politics in 1530s Istanbul,” International Journal of Turkish Studies 13 (2007): 51‑62.
- "Of Gender and Servitude, ca. 1520: Two Petitions of the Kul Kizi of Bergama to Sultan Süleyman," in Mélanges en l'Honneur du Prof. Dr. Suraiya Faroqhi, ed. Abdeljelil Temimi (Tunis: Publications de la Fondation Temimi, 2009), 143-151.
- “Ancient Wisdom and New Sciences: Prophecies at the Ottoman Court in the Fifteenth and Early Sixteenth Centuries,” in Falnama. The Book of Omens, eds. Massumeh Farhad and Serpil Bağcı (Washington, 2009), 232‑43.
- "Companions to King Errant: Babur and his Lieutenants to the Conquest of Kabul," in Horizons of the World: Festschrift for İsenbike Togan (Istanbul: İthaki, 2011), 545-556.
- "A Mediterranean Apocalypse: Prophecies of Empire in the Fifteenth and Sixteenth Centuries," Journal of the Economic and Social History of the Orient 61(2018): 18-90 [Special issue: Speaking the End Times: Early Modern Politics and Religion from Iberia to Central Asia, ed. Mayte Green-Mercado].
- "The Mystic Lettrist Abd al-Rahman al-Bistami and the Origins of Ottoman Historical Consciousness" Lecture at the American School of Classical Studies at Athens, May 8, 2015 https://www.ascsa.edu.gr/News/newsDetails/videocast-the-mystic-lettrist-abd-al-rahman-al-bistami-and-the-origins-of-o

== See also ==
- Center for Middle Eastern Studies at the University of Chicago
- Islamic scholars
