= Malika Zeghal =

French anthropologist, political scientist and sociologist

Malika Zeghal (born 1965) is a French Professor in Contemporary Islamic Thought and Life in the Department of Near Eastern Languages and Civilizations at Harvard University, and formerly an associate professor of the anthropology and sociology of religion in the University of Chicago Divinity School.

== Biography ==
She was a student of the École Normale Supérieure (rue d'Ulm, Paris) where she was admitted in 1987. She received her doctorate from the Institut d'Etudes Politiques de Paris in 1994. She began her postdoctoral research in 1995 at the Hagop Kevorkian Center for Near Eastern Studies at New York University before returning to France to join for ten years, the Centre national de la recherche scientifique from 1995 to 2005. She is a Member of the Scientific Council of the Tunisian Academy of Sciences, Letters, and Arts.

Her work, Gardiens de l'Islam: Les oulémas d'Al Azhar dans l'Egypte contemporaine, written in French is an analysis of the influence of the ulama of Al-Azhar University. A. Marsot argues her thesis is that "the ulama of the Azhar believe that it is their duty, daʿwa, as the guardians of religion to see that the laws of a country conform to the shariʿa; thus, their struggle with the authorities is defined by an attempt to set aside the laws of the state in favor of the shariʿa." The book explores how state interactions with the Azhari ulama helped to lead to the rise other Islamic movements, namely the Muslim Brotherhood, outside of traditional institutions.

Her most recent book, The Making of the Modern Muslim State: Islam and Governance in the Middle East and North Africa was published by Princeton University Press in 2024.

== Courses taught ==
At Harvard University's Faculty of Arts and Sciences, she often teaches a General Education Course called "GENED1123: Islam and Politics in the Modern Middle East," a seminar called "MODMDEST 315: Reading al-Manar in the Interwar Period" and a course on the modern Middle East called "MODMDEST 100: The Modern Middle East, Real and Imagined: An Introduction."

== Bibliography ==
- Gardiens de l'Islam. Les oulémas d'al-Azhar dans l'Egypte contemporaine Presses de Sciences Po, 1996. ISBN 2-7246-0679-5
- Les islamistes marocains: le défi à la monarchie La Découverte, 2005. ISBN 2-7071-4480-0
- The Making of the Modern Muslim State: Islam and Governance in the Middle East and North Africa Princeton University Press, 2024. ISBN 9780691134369
