= Gustave E. von Grunebaum =

Austrian historian (1909–1972)

- Portrait of Gustave Grunebaum
- Born: Gustav Edmund Ritter von Grünebaum; 1 September 1909; Vienna, Austria
- Died: 27 February 1972 (aged 62); Los Angeles, California

Gustave Edmund von Grunebaum (1 September 1909 in Vienna, Austria – 27 February 1972 in Los Angeles, California, born Gustav Edmund Ritter von Grünebaum) was an Austrian historian and Arabist.

Born in Vienna, Grunebaum received his Ph.D. in Oriental Studies at the University of Vienna in 1931 with a dissertation on classical Arabic poetry. When Nazi Germany absorbed Austria in the Anschluss of 1938, he went to the United States, where he was given a position at the Asia Institute in New York City by Arthur Upham Pope, an eminent authority on Persian art and antiquities who used the institute to help a number of displaced German scholars find work in the United States in the 1930s and 1940s. In 1943, he moved on to the University of Chicago, and was made professor of Arabic in 1949. In 1957, Grunebaum was appointed professor of Near Eastern History and the director of a new department called the Near Eastern Center at UCLA. He was elected to the American Academy of Arts and Sciences in 1963 and the American Philosophical Society in 1968. He died in Los Angeles at the age of 62 following brief battle with cancer. The Near Eastern Center was later renamed in Grunebaum's honor.

Grunebaum was married to Giselle Steuerman.

== Books ==
- 1937, Islam and medieval Hellenism: social and cultural perspectives
- 1953, Medieval Islam
- 1955, In Search of Wealth: A Study of the Emergence of Commercial Operations in the Melanesian Society of Southeastern Papua (co-authored with Cyril S Belshaw and Joe Ben Wheat)
- 1964, Modern Islam: The Search for Cultural Identity
- 1964, French African literature: some cultural implications
- 1964, Parallelism, Convergence, and Influence in the Relations of Arab and Byzantine Philosophy, Literature, and Piety
- 1965, Islam: experience of the holy and concept of man
- 1971, Theology and law in Islam
- 1971, Arabic poetry. Theory and development (editor)
- 1981 (reprint), Themes in medieval Arabic literature
- 2003, Instruction of the Student: The Method of Learning (co-authored with Burhān al-Dīn Zarnūjī and Theodora Mead Abel)
- 2005 (reprint), Classical Islam: A History, 600 A.D. to 1258 A.D., 1972
- 2008 (reprint), Mohammedan Festivals
- 2011 (reprint), A Tenth Century Document of Arabic Literary Theory and Criticism: The Sections on Poetry of Al-Baqillani's I'jaz Al-Qur'an

== Articles ==
- 'Toynbee’s Concept of Islamic Civilization’ in Gargan, Edward T., ed., The Intent of Toynbee’s History : A Cooperative Appraisal (Chicago: Loyola University Press, 1955).
