= Leonard Binder =

American political scientist

Leonard Binder (1927-2015) was an American political scientist. He was a distinguished professor of political science and the former director of the Near East Center at the University of California, Los Angeles (UCLA). Binder was also Chair of the Political Science Departments of UCLA and the University of Chicago. He was elected a Fellow of the American Academy of Arts and Sciences in 2002

== Published works ==
- Religion and Politics in Pakistan (1961)
- Iran: Political Development in a Changing Society (1962)
- The Ideological Revolution in the Middle East (1964)
- In a Moment of Enthusiasm: Political Power and the second Stratum in Egypt (1978)
- Islamic Liberalism (1988)
