= Shamsuddin Aflaki =

Persian scholar, astronomer and hagiographer

Shams al-Din Ahmad Aflaki

Personal life
- Born: Between 1286 and 1291 CE Likely outside Konya (modern-day Turkey)
- Died: 17 June 1360 CE Konya, Turkey
- Notable work(s): Manāqeb al-ʿārefīn (Virtues of the Gnostics), Hundred Tales of Wisdom
- Occupation: Scholar, astronomer, hagiographer

Religious life
- Religion: Islam
- Denomination: Sufism (Mevlevi Order)

Muslim leader
- Influenced by: Rumi, Awlā ʿĀref Čelebī
- Influenced: Numerous scholars of Sufism and Rumi's legacy

Shamsuddin Ahmad Aflaki (Persian: شمسالدین احمد افلاکی; d. 1360 CE), also known as Aflākī ʿĀrefī, was a 13th–14th-century Iranian scholar, astronomer, and hagiographer best known for his biographical works on the Sufi mystic Rumi and his disciples. His writings remain pivotal sources for understanding the Mevlevi Order and Rumi's spiritual legacy.

== Early life and education ==
Aflaki was born between 1286 and 1291 CE, likely outside Konya (modern-day Turkey). His father was a scholar at the court of Awrang Khan of the Golden Horde. Aflaki later migrated to Konya, where he studied under prominent scholars such as Serāj-al-Dīn Maṯnawīḵᵛān and Neẓām-al-Dīn Arzanǰānī. He initially pursued astronomy and pharmacology before devoting himself to Sufism under the guidance of Awlā ʿĀref Čelebī, a descendant of Rumi's lineage.

== Career and literal contributions ==
Aflaki became a disciple of the Mevlevi Order, documenting the lives of Rumi and his successors. His most renowned work, Manāqeb al-ʿārefīn (Virtues of the Gnostics), was commissioned in 1318 by Awlā ʿĀref Čelebī. This text blends historical accounts, legends, and firsthand testimonies about Rumi's spiritual influence, disciples like Shams Tabrizi and Husam al-Din Chalabi, and the early Mevlevi community.

Aflaki's writings also provide insights into Anatolian Sufi culture, including rituals such as the sama (whirling ceremony). Despite their hagiographical nature, his works are valued for preserving oral traditions and poetic references from Rumi's circle.

=== Notable works ===
- Manāqeb al-ʿārefīn (مناقب العارفین): A two-volume compilation detailing Rumi's life, miracles, and teachings, completed in 1319. It draws from primary sources like Rumi’s letters, Shams Tabrizi’s discourses (Maqālāt), and Sultan Walad’s writings. This work is also translated into Turkish and later into European languages, including French (Les saints des derviches tourneurs) and English (The Feats of the Knowers of God).
- Hundred Tales of Wisdom: A condensed collection of anecdotes and parables from Manāqeb al-ʿārefīn, highlighting Rumi's spiritual insights.

== Death and legacy ==
Aflaki died on 30 Rajab 761 AH (17 June 1360 CE) and was buried in Konya. His contributions to preserving Rumi's legacy earned him a lasting place in Islamic literary history.

Aflaki's works, though criticized for blending fact with legend, remain foundational for studies on Rumi and Sufism. Scholars like Franklin Lewis and Annemarie Schimmel have utilized his accounts while cautioning against their uncritical use. His texts also offer sociological and cultural insights into medieval Anatolia, particularly the Seljuk-era Sufi networks.

== See also ==
- Faridun bin Ahmad Sipahsalar
