= Faouzi Skali =

Moroccan anthropologist and Sufi scholar

Faouzi Skali is a Moroccan anthropologist and prominent Sufi scholar. He is the founder and president of the Fes World Festival of Sacred Music and the Fes Festival of Sufi Culture. In 2001, he was dubbed by the United Nations as one of the twelve world personalities who contributed to the dialogue of civilizations.

== Biography ==
Born in Fez, Morocco in 1953, Faouzi Skali developed an interest in Sufism in his early years through reading a book of Rumi. He then met Sidi Hamza al Qadiri Buchichi and became his disciple. Skali has a PhD in anthropology, ethnology and religious sciences from Sorbonne University. A former member of the European Commission's Groupe de Sages, Skali was decorated as Chevalier of the Legion of Honor by the French Republic in May 2014 in recognition of his career and his actions for promotion of cultural diversity particularly through the creation of the World Sacred Music Festival, held every year in the capital of Morocco.

== Works ==
- La Voie soufie (The Sufi Way), Albin Michel, Spiritualités Vivantes, 1985, 1993, 2000.
- Traces de lumière, paroles initiatiques soufies (Traces of Light, Sufi Initiatory Words), Albin Michel, Spiritualités Vivantes, 1996, 2004.
- Le Face à face des cœurs, le soufisme aujourd'hui (The Face to Face of Hearts, Sufism Today), Editions du Relié, 2000, Presses Pocket, 2002.
- Jésus dans la tradition soufie (Jesus in the Sufi Tradition), co-authored with Eva de Vitray-Meyerovitch, Albin Michel, 2004.
- Saints et sanctuaires de Fès (Saints and Sanctuaries of Fez), ed. Marsam, 2007.
- Guérir l'esprit, le colloque de Bodhgaya (Healing the Mind, the Bodhgaya Colloquium), co-authored with Jean-Yves Leloup et Lama Denys Teundroup, Albin Michel, Espaces Libres, 2001, 2004.
- Un et nu, collectif (One and Naked, Collective), Albin Michel, 1981. Avec André Chouraqui, Camille Jordens, Jean-Yves Leloup, Jean Mouttapa, Pierre Solié, Annick de Souzenelle.
- Moïse dans la tradition soufie (Moses in the Sufi Tradition), Albin Michel, 2011.
- Le souvenir de l'être profond. Propos sur l'enseignement d'un maître soufi, Sidi Hamza (The Memory of the Inner Being. About Teachings a Sufi Master, Sidi Hamza), Editions du Relié, 2012.

== See also ==
- Zakia Zouanat
