= Ulu Arif Chelebi =

Mevlevi scholar (1272–1320)

Jalal al-Din Feridun (7 June 1272 – 5 February 1320), known as Amir Arif and later Ulu Arif Chelebi, was a Mevlevi scholar and poet.

He was born on 7 June 1272 to Sultan Walad, son of the famous poet Rumi, and Fatima Khatun. Most of Arif's siblings died young, and Rumi was involved in Arif's upbringing until Arif was past one and a half years old. The only known detail on his education is that at six years old, he received lessons on Quran from a man from Malatya dubbed "Salah al-Din." Based on Arif's later literary works, he likely received relevant education beforehand.

== Bibliography ==
- Yazıcı, Tahsin (1990). "Čelebī, ʿĀref". In Yarshater, Ehsan (ed.). Encyclopædia Iranica. Vol. V/2: C̆ehel Sotūn, Isfahan–Central Asia XIII. London and New York: Routledge & Kegan Paul. pp. 121–122. ISBN 978-0-939214-69-3.
