= Eva de Vitray-Meyerovitch =

French scholar of Islam (1909–1999)

- Born: 5 November 1909; Boulogne-Billancourt, Paris, France
- Died: 24 July 1999 (aged 89); 5th arrondissement of Paris, France
- Occupation: Islamicist

Eva de Vitray-Meyerovitch (5 November 1909 – 24 July 1999) was a French scholar of Islam, a researcher at the Centre national de la recherche scientifique (CNRS), and a translator and writer, who published a total of forty books and numerous articles. She was a disciple of the Sufi master Hamza al Qadiri al Boutchichi.

== Life ==
Eva Lamacque de Vitray was born on November 5, 1909, in Boulogne-Billancourt, an affluent Parisian suburb. From a privileged social background, she was educated in Catholic schools before studying for a law degree. She began a doctorate in philosophy on the subject of "Symbolism in Plato."

At the age of 22, De Vitray-Meyerovitch married Lazare Meyerovitch, of Latvian Jewish origins. She became an administrator in the laboratory of Frédéric Joliot-Curie. In 1940, De Vitray-Meyerovitch escaped from Paris with Joliot-Curie during the German occupation of Paris and retired to the Corrèze department for the duration of the war. De Vitray-Meyerovitch's husband was a member of the Free French Forces. After the liberation of France, De Vitray-Meyerovitch joined the CNRS, where she soon became director of the human sciences department. She earned an income from translations. She met orientalist Louis Massignon, with whom she would remain closely linked and who supported her after the sudden death of her husband in the early 1950s.

De Vitray-Meyerovitch discovered Islam through the book The Reconstruction of Religious Thought in Islam by poet and author Muhammad Iqbal. After three years of studying Christian exegesis at the Sorbonne, she chose to become a Muslim. She took the Arabic name Hawwa, a translation of her Christian name. De Vitray-Meyerovitch was very interested in the work of the Persian poet Jalâl ud Dîn Rûmî (1207–1273), through whom she became aware of the mystical aspect of Islam, Sufism. Subsequently, she embarked on learning Persian. Soon afterward, she published her first translations of Muhammad Iqbal and Rumi into French.

In 1968, De Vitray-Meyerovitch defended her doctoral dissertation at the University of Paris on Mystical Themes in the Work of Jalal Ud Dîn Rûmî. From 1969 to 1973, she taught in Cairo at Al-Azhar University. In 1971, she made the pilgrimage to Mecca and also visited Medina. From 1972 until her death, she regularly published annotated translations of Rûmi's writings and works she wrote herself on Islam, Sufism, and the whirling dervishes. In 1990, she published her translation of Rumi's Masnavi, a colossal work of 50,000 verses in 1,700 pages, translated for the first time into French.

Parallel to her academic career, De Vitray-Meyerovitch pursued a personal quest that led her to meet many personalities involved in Sufism, such as Amadou Hampâté Ba, Najm Oud Din Bammate, Cheikh Bentounès, and Faouzi Skali. Through Skali, in Morocco in 1985, she met a living Sufi spiritual guide, Hamza al Qadiri al Boutchichi, whose teaching she would follow until her death. She was also active as a speaker in France and abroad on Rumi, Islam, and Sufism. In addition, she recorded several programs for France Culture and television. In 1998, during her last conference in Turkey, she expressed the wish to be buried in Konya.

Eva de Vitray-Meyerovitch died on July 24, 1999, in her apartment on rue Claude-Bernard in Paris. She was buried in a private ceremony in Thiais, in the Paris region. In 2003, steps were taken to transfer her remains to Konya, which was finalized in 2008. On November 17, 2008, an official ceremony accompanied the burial of the coffin of Vitray-Meyerovitch in Konya. Her grave is opposite the mausoleum of Jalal ud Din Rumi.

== Publications ==
=== As author ===
- Eva de Vitray-Meyerovitch (1978), Anthologie du Soufisme, Sindbad [Republished in 1986 and 1995, Albin Michel, coll. Spiritualités vivantes, 132. Work translated into Italian]
- Eva de Vitray-Meyerovitch (1997), Le Chant de Rûmî, Les petits livres de la sagesse, La Table Ronde
- Eva de Vitray-Meyerovitch (1993), Le Chant du Soleil, La Table ronde [Work translated into Spanish and Turkish]
- Eva de Vitray-Meyerovitch (1982), Les Chemins de la Lumière : 75 contes soufis, Retz [Work translated into Spanish]
- Eva de Vitray-Meyerovitch; Jean-Yves Leloup; André Borrely, L'Image de l'Homme dans le Christianisme et l'Islam, de l’Ouvert, 1984
- Eva de Vitray-Meyerovitch, Islam, l'autre Visage, Albin Michel, 1995. Ouvrage traduit en espagnol, en anglais et en turc
- Eva de Vitray-Meyerovitch; Faouzi Skali (1985), Jésus dans la Tradition Soufie, de l’Ouvert [Republished in 2004, Albin Michel. Work translated into Italian, Spanish and Catalan]
- Eva de Vitray-Meyerovitch (1990), Konya ou la Danse Cosmique, Renard [Work translated into Turkish]
- Eva de Vitray-Meyerovitch, La Mecque : ville sainte de l'islam, Laffont, 1987 [Work translated into Italian, German and Turkish]
- Eva de Vitray-Meyerovitch (1972), Mystique et Poésie en Islam, Desclée de Brouwer
- Eva de Vitray-Meyerovitch, La Prière en Islam, Albin Michel, c1998 [Republished in 2003, Albin Michel, coll. Spiritualités vivantes. Work translated into Italian and Turkish]
- Eva de Vitray-Meyerovitch (1977), Rûmî et le Soufisme, du Seuil [Republished in 2005, collection Points Sagesses. Work translated into English, Romanian, Portuguese, Bosnian and Czech]
- Eva de Vitray-Meyerovitch (1968), Thèmes mystiques dans l'œuvre de Djalâl ud-Dîn Rûmî (thesis (Paris))
- Eva de Vitray-Meyerovitch (2014), Universalité de l'islam, Albin Michel

=== Translations from Persian ===
- Djalâl ad-Dîn Rûmî (1990), Lettres, translated by Eva de Vitray-Meyerovitch, Jacqueline Renard
- Muhammad Iqbal (1962), Le Livre de l'Eternité, translated by Eva de Vitray-Meyerovitch, Mohammed Mokri, Albin Michel
- Djalâl ad-Dîn Rûmî (1975), Le Livre du Dedans, translated by Eva de Vitray-Meyerovitch, Sindbad Republished in 1982 and 1997, Albin Michel, coll. Spiritualités vivantes. Also translated in Italian and Spanish.
- Sultan Walad (1982), Maître et Disciple, translated by Eva de Vitray-Meyerovitch, Sindbad
- Djalâl ad-Dîn Rûmî (1990), Mathnawi, translated by Eva de Vitray-Meyerovitch and Jamshid Murtazavi, du Rocher
- Muhammad Iqbal; Mohammed Achena (1956), Message de l'Orient, translated by Eva de Vitray-Meyerovitch, Belles Lettres
- Djalâl ad-Dîn Rûmî (1973), Odes Mystiques, translated by Eva de Vitray-Meyerovitch, Klincksieck republished in 2003, Points Sagesses
- Sultan Walad (1988), La Parole Secrète, translated by Eva de Vitray-Meyerovitch and Jamshid Murtazavi, du Rocher
- Djalâl ad-Dîn Rûmî (2000), Les Quatrains de Rûmi, translated by Eva de Vitray-Meyerovitch, Jamshid Murtazavi and Albin Michel
- Mahmud Shabestari (1991), La Roseraie du Mystère, translated by Eva de Vitray-Meyerovitch and Jamshid Murtazavi, Sindbad
- Djalâl ad-Dîn Rûmî (1993), Rubaiy'at, translated by Eva de Vitray-Meyerovitch and Jamshid Murtazavi, Albin Michel republished in 2003, Albin Michel, coll. Spiritualités vivantes.
- Muhammad Iqbal (2000), Les Secrets du Soi, translated by Eva de Vitray-Meyerovitch, Albin Michel, coll. Spiritualités vivantes

=== Translations from English ===
- R. Zaehner (1974), L'Hindouisme, translated by Eva de Vitray-Meyerovitch, Desclée de Brouwer
- R. Zaehner (1965), Inde, Islam, Israël, translated by Eva de Vitray-Meyerovitch, Desclée de Brouwer
- Muhammad Iqbal (1980), La Métaphysique en Perse, translated by Eva de Vitray-Meyerovitch, Sindbad
- R. Zaehner (1983), Mystique Sacrée et Mystique Profane, translated by Eva de Vitray-Meyerovitch, du Rocher
- Muhammad Iqbal (1955), Reconstruire la Pensée Religieuse de l'Islam, translated by Eva de Vitray-Meyerovitch, Adrien-Maisonneuve [Reprinted in 1996 by du Rocher / UNESCO]
- R. Rees (1968), Simone Weil : esquisse d'un portrait, translated by Eva de Vitray-Meyerovitch, Buchet-Chastel

== Sources ==
- Bentounes, Cheikh Khaled (10 December 2010), Extrait d'une conférence du Cheikh Bentounes à Konya (in French), AISA Suisse
- Caron, Eva; Galindo, Marie-Hélène (2005), " Une immense soif d'amour et de connaissance...", archived from the original on 24 November 2006
- "Eva de Vitray-Meyerovitch", Hommes & faits (in French), 14 March 2006, archived from the original on 14 January 2016
- "Eva par elle-même", Soufisme (in French), 21 January 2002
- Hamimaz, Rachid; Girotto, Jean-Louis (23 January 2009), "Le dernier voyage d'Eva à Konya", Soufisme (in French), archived from the original on 1 December 2017
- "In the shadow of Hz. Mevlana", Semazen.net, 18 December 2008, archived from the original on 25 December 2008
- "Lazare Meyerovitch", Les Français Libres (in French)
- Leftah, Mohamed (20–26 August 1999), "Eva de Vitray-Meyerovitch: L'autre visage de l'Islam", Le Temps du Maroc (in French) (199), archived from the original on 15 September 2010
- "Les trépas 1999", Histoires litteraires (in French), 2000, archived from the original on 5 July 2011
- "Revue de la presse turque", TRT-World Français (in French), Turkish Radio – Television Corporation, 8 November 2008, archived from the original on 5 July 2011
- Skali, Faouzi (17 December 2001), "Eva ou la rencontre des deux rives", Soufisme (in French)
- Skali, Faouzi (2005), Jésus dans la tradition soufie (in French), Albin Michel Littérature, ISBN 978-2226154378
- Tahrali, Mustafa (1999), A General Outline of the Influence of Ibn 'Arabi on the Ottoman Era, Muhyiddin Ibn Arabi Society
- Vitray-Meyerovitch, Eva de; Cartier, Rachel; Cartier, Jean-Pierre (1995), Islam, l'autre visage : Entretiens avec Rachel et Jean-Pierre Cartier (in French), Albin Michel, ISBN 978-2226077530
