= Ysé Tardan-Masquelier =

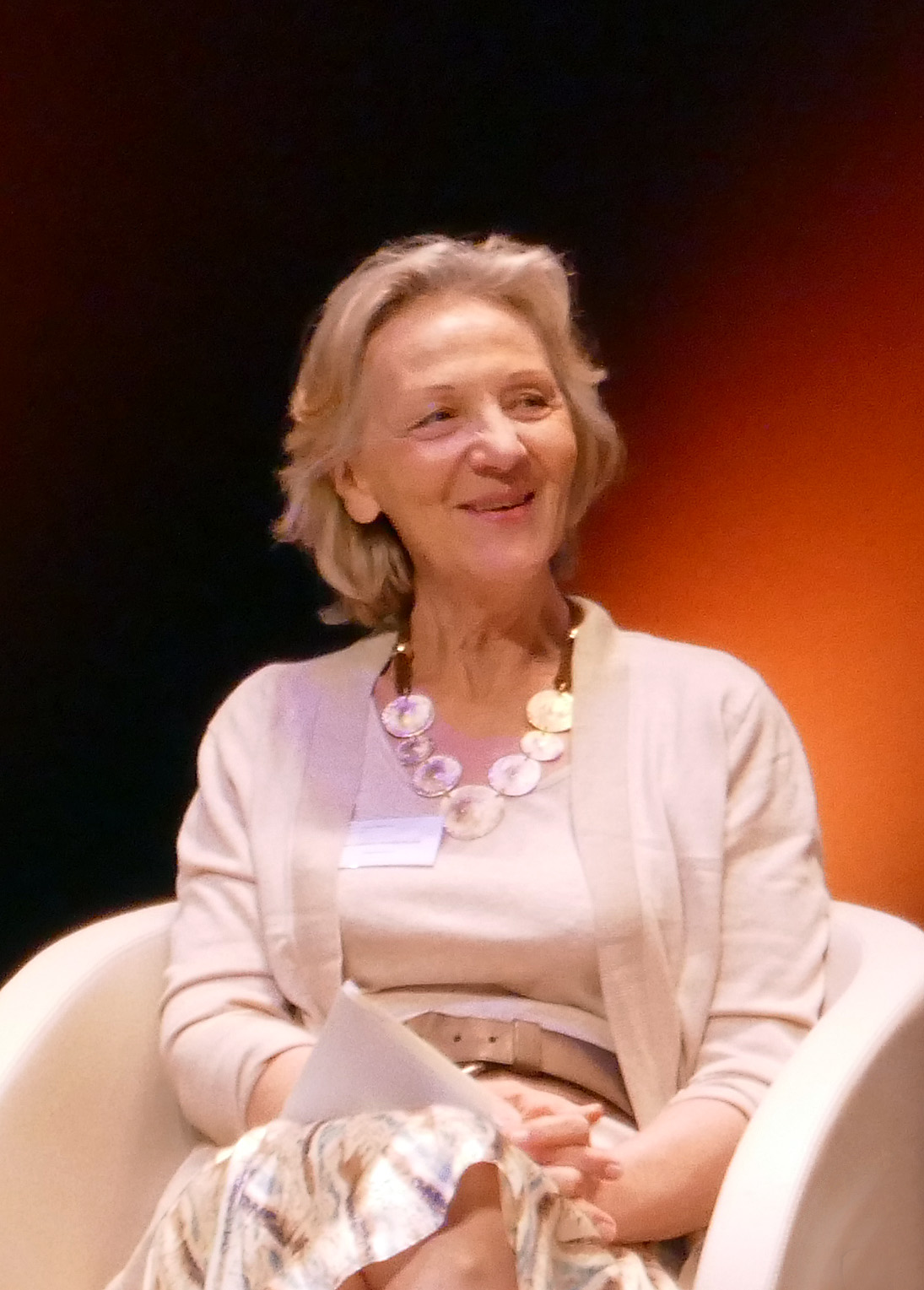
Ysé Tardan-Masquelier (2017)

Ysé Tardan-Masquelier is an essayist and historian of religion, specialising in Hinduism. She teaches eastern spirituality at the Paris-Sorbonne University-Sorbonne and the Institut Catholique de Paris.

== Works ==
- Apprendre à être heureux, collectif, Albin Michel, 2008. Avec Lytta Basset, Pascal Bruckner, Marek Halter, Jean-Yves Leloup, Gérard Miller
- Un milliard d'hindous, Albin Michel, 2007
- La quête de guérison. Médecine et religions face à la souffrance, Michel Meslin, Bayard Culture, 2006
- Le livre des sagesses (avec Frédéric Lenoir), Bayard Culture, 2005
- L'esprit du yoga, Albin Michel, 2005.
- Jung et la question du sacré, Albin Michel, 1998.
