= Sangtuda =

- Village and Jamoat
- Location within Tajikistan
- Coordinates: 38°02′N 69°05′E
- Country: Tajikistan
- Region: Khatlon
- District: Danghara District

Population (2015)
  - Total: 12,686
- Time zone: UTC+5 (TJT)
- Official languages: Russian (Interethnic); Tajik (State) (Note: Constitution of Tajikistan)

Sangtuda (Russian: Сангтуда; Tajik: Сангтӯда, Persian: سنگ‌توده) is a village and jamoat in Tajikistan. It is located in Danghara District in Khatlon Region. The jamoat has a total population of 12,686 (2015).

Located on the East bank of the Wakhsh River, a major tributary of the Amu Darya (or Oxus River), the place was known as Wakhsh in the Medieval period.

== History ==
Sangtuda was the birthplace of the Persian poet Jalal al-Din Rumi, whose father, Muhammad ibn Husayn Khatibi, better known as Baha al-Din Walad, lived and worked in the town, then known as Wakhsh, as a jurist and preacher until 1212, when Rumi was around five and the family moved to Samarkand.

The town of Sangtuda is identified as the medieval town of Wakhsh or Lêwkand by Franklin Lewis.
