= Faridun bin Ahmad Sipahsalar =

Contemporary and disciple of Rumi

- Title: Military Commander (Sipahsalar), Sufi Disciple, Biographer

Personal life
- Born: Faridun bin Ahmad Sipahsalar
- Died: c. 1284 – 1312 Konya, Seljuk Sultanate of Rum (modern days Turkey)
- Resting place: Near Rumi's family, Konya, Turkey
- Children: Muhammad Jalaleddin
- Notable work(s): Risāla-yi Aḥwāl-i Mawlānā ("Treatise on the Conditions of Mawlānā"), Risāle-i Sipahsālār be-Menākıb-ı Hüdâvendigâr
- Known for: Biography of Rumi, leadership within the Mevlevi Order
- Other name: Sipahsalar
- Occupation: Military commander, Sufi, writer, administrator

Religious life
- Religion: Islam (Sufi)
- Denomination: Mevlevi Order

Senior posting
- Influenced by: Rumi
- Influenced: Shamsuddin Aflaki

Faridun bin Ahmad Sipahsalar (Persian: فریدون بن احمد سپهسالار), commonly known as Sipahsalar, was a 13th-century Persian military commander, Sufi disciple, and biographer of the renowned mystic poet Rumi. His work, Risāla-yi Aḥwāl-i Mawlānā ("Treatise on the Conditions of Mawlānā"), stands as one of the earliest and most influential accounts of Rumi's life and spiritual legacy. Sipahsalar's writings provide critical insights into the formative years of the Mevlevi Order and the socio-political context of Seljuk Anatolia.

== Association with Rumi and the Mevlevi Order ==
After retiring from his military role, Sipahsalar became a devoted disciple of Rumi, serving him for over 40 years. He played a key administrative role in the Mevlevi order, managing the financial affairs of Rumi's dergah (Sufi lodge) during the leadership of Husam al-Din Chalabi, Rumi's close companion and successor.

== Literary contributions ==
Sipahsalar's most significant contribution is the Risāle-i Sipahsālār be-Menākıb-ı Hüdâvendigâr (Treatise of the Commander on the Virtues of the Master), the first major hagiography of Rumi written in Persian. Completed posthumously by his son, Muhammad Jalaleddin, the work is divided into three sections:

1. Bahāeddin Velad (Rumi’s father),
2. Rumi’s life and teachings,
3. Rumi’s successors, including Sultan Walad and other Mevlevi leaders.

The Risāle is notable for its eyewitness accounts and reliance on Rumi’s own writings, such as the Masnavi and Divan-i Shams. It became a foundational source for later biographies, including Shamsuddin Aflaki’s Manāqib al-Ārifīn.

== Death and legacy ==
Sipahsalar's death date remains uncertain, with scholars proposing ranges between 1284 and 1312 914. He was buried near Rumi's family in Konya, Turkey, per his request. His Risāle remains a critical primary source for understanding Rumi's spiritual legacy and the socio-political context of the Seljuk era. Modern scholars praise the text for its historical insights, though acknowledge its partiality as a devotional work.

== See also ==
- Shamsuddin Aflaki
