= 585 AM =

AM radio frequency

The following radio stations broadcast on AM frequency 585 kHz:

== Australia ==
- 6PB at Perth, Western Australia
- 7RN at Hobart, Tasmania

== Iran ==
- Radio Farhang in Tehran

== Philippines ==
- DYLL-AM in Iloilo City
- DXCP in General Santos

== Fictional ==
585 AM was also the radio frequency of the fictional WNYX news station on the sitcom Newsradio in the late 1990s.
