= Fihi Ma Fihi =

13th-century Sufi work by Rumi

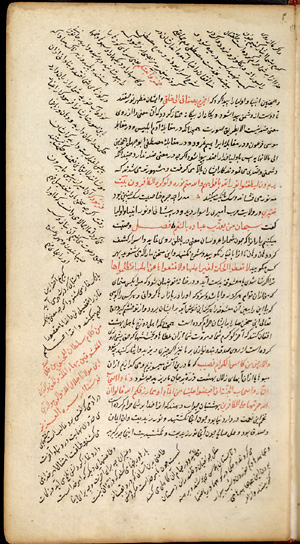
A page of Fihi Ma Fihi from MuntaXab-i Fihi Ma Fihi

The Fihi Ma Fihi or Fīhi Mā Fīhi (Arabic: فیه ما فیه), lit. ''It Is What It Is" or "In It What Is in It'') is a Persian prose work of 13th-century Sufi mystic and a poet from modern day Afghanistan, Jalāl al-Dīn Muḥammad Rūmī. The book has 72 short discourses.

== Description ==
=== The title and origin of the book ===
According to J. M. Sadeghi the title Fihi Ma Fihi has appeared on a copy dated 1316. Another copy of the book dated 1350 has the title Asrar al-Jalalieh. Rumi himself in the fifth volume of Masnavi-i Ma'navi mentions that

بس سؤال و بس جواب و ماجرا
بُد میان زاهد و رب الوری

که زمین و آسمان پرنور شد
در مقالات آن همه مذکور شد

— Reynold A. Nicholson. The Mathnawi Of Jalauddin Rumi, vol. VI, p. 161

which most likely refers to this book. The title Maghalat-e Mowlana of copies of the book published in Iran follows this.

Not much is known about the publication time and the writer of the book. According to B. Forouzanfar, the editor of the most reliable copy of the book, it is likely that the book was written by Sultanwalad, the eldest son of Rumi, based on manuscripts and notes taken by himself or others from the lectures of his father on Masnavi-i Ma'navi.

In the Essence of Rumi, John Baldock states that Fihi Ma Fihi was one of Rumi's discourses written towards the end of his life. Rumi lived from 1207 to 1273 so Fihi Ma Fihi was likely written some time between 1260 and 1273 by Rumi himself.

== Significance ==
This book is one of the first Persian prose books after the so-called Persian literature revolution (enghelāb-e adabi). Moreover, the book has become an introduction to the Masnavi. Also many concepts in Sufism are described in this book in simple terms.

== English translations ==
The book has been translated into English under the title Discourses of Rumi by A. J. Arberry in 1961 and consists of 71 discourses. Another translation by Dr. Bankey Behari was published in 1998 under the title Fiha Ma Fiha, Table Talk of Maulani Rumi (DK Publishers, New Delhi), ISBN 81-7646-029-X. A more recent translation into English, with commentary for each of the discourses, by Doug Marman (with the assistance of Jamileh Marefat, a direct descendant of Rumi) was published in 2010 under the title It Is What It Is, The Personal Discourses of Rumi (Spiritual Dialogues Project, Ridgefield, Washington), ISBN 978-0-9793260-5-9. Another English translation, by W.M. Thackston, Jr, was published in 1994 under the title 'Signs of the Unseen: The Discourses of Jalaluddin Rumi' (Putney, VT: Threshold Books, 1994; republished by Shambhala Publications, 1999).

== See also ==
- Masnavi
- Pervane
