= Majid Naini =

Iranian writer and scholar (born 1963)

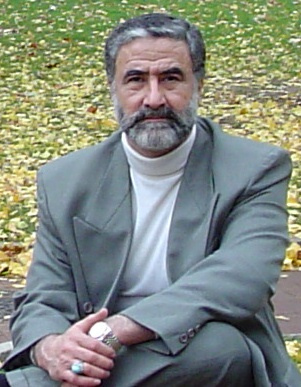
- Born: 24 October 1963 (age 63)
- Education: Ph.D.
- Alma mater: University of Pennsylvania
- Occupations: Professor, author, Rumi scholar, world peace advocate, department chair, university dean, philanthropist, TV and padio personality
- Website: www.naini.net

Majid Naini (Persian: مجید نایینی; born 24 October 1963) is a scholar and speaker.

== Biography ==
Majid Naini was born on 24 October 1963. Naini earned a B.S. in Electronics Engineering, Master's Degree in Computer Science, and Ph.D. in Computer & Information Science & Technology from University of Pennsylvania.

Naini has been a keynote speaker at over 500 events. In the U.S., he has presented workshops and lectures and been an invited keynote speaker at the end of General Assembly at the United Nations on the occasion of Rumi's birthday.

Naini has spoken at the University of Pennsylvania, Princeton University, Johns Hopkins University, Yale University, George Washington University, Rutgers University, Stanford University, UCSD, UCLA, UCSB, Ventura College, Caltech, USC, University of Illinois at Urbana-Champaign, John Carroll University, University of Tennessee, University of New Mexico, Embry-Riddle Aeronautical University, Florida International University, and Florida Atlantic University. Naini was the keynote speaker for Rumi Shine for Peace at the James Bridges Theatre at UCLA. For Rumi's 805th birthday, Naini was invited by the University of Southern California for their Visions & Voices program in Bovard Auditorium. Religious and cultural institutions that have hosted him include the Molana House, IMAN, Kashi Center, Chaplain Associations, Unity Churches, Science of Mind Centers, Milagro Center, and the Museum of Art and Science in Melbourne.

Naini was honored by Florida's capital, Tallahassee, for his talk "Rumi's Teachings on Global Peace and Harmony" at the Mayor's Summit for Race, Cultural, and Human Relations. Naini was invited as a keynote speaker at an international conference in Antalya and in Konya in honor of the Year of Rumi. Naini was later also honored to be invited as a keynote speaker by Turkey's government and the Mevlana International Foundation at the grand 737th anniversary of the passing of Rumi (shabe arus) in Konya, Turkey (the most important event honoring Rumi with around 100,000 people from all over the world traveling to Konya to memorialize him).

== Books and papers ==
Naini's book, The Mysteries of the Universe and Rumi’s Discoveries on the Majestic Path of Love, contains Naini's own translations from Rumi's original Persian texts.

== Media coverage ==
Naini was chosen by American composer Shawn Crouch to collaborate on a musical work, "The Garden of Paradise", for which he selected and translated some of Rumi's poetry about love and peace. The ensemble Chanticleer performed this piece five times as part of their "Composer/Our Age" program in Berkeley, Santa Clara, and San Francisco Conservatory of Music in March 2009. Naini has been featured in the San Francisco Chronicle, Sun-Sentinel, Tallahassee Democrat, Boca News, Penn Gazette, Huffington Post, Tehran Times, Iran Times, Willie Nelson's website, Deepak Chopra's Satellite Radio, Liz Sterling Talk Show, NBC, CNN, ITN Cable TV, Ettellaat, Keyhan Havai, Radio Farhang, Jam-e-Jam International TV, Pars Times, and elsewhere, and TV and radio shows, including a PBS program Iran: A Celebration of Art and Culture, and an 18-part series, Mysteries of the Universe. He was featured on the international TV three-part special: Rumi Documentary for The Year Of Rumi (2007, UNESCO).

Naini was honored by a Malaysian magazine for a featured article about him and his work, for the section "The People Whom We Are Most Proud of", and on the occasion of Rumi's birthday to be invited to write an article which was carried on international flights. For Norooz, Mrs. Anousheh Ansari (astronaut) and Naini were selected from among all the Iranians in America and invited to write a full-page article in the Iran Times.

Naini frequently appears on numerous radio and TV shows, and he has had weekly radio and TV programs on Los Angeles stations about poetry, science, technology, and mysticism.

== Bibliography ==
- Couriel, Jonathan, "Can Rumi Save Us Now?", San Francisco Chronicle, 1 April 2007; p. E-3
- Nelson, Willie, "Peace Through Love: Thank You Majid Naini"
- Reeves, Linda, "Mystic love - Delray Professor devotes himself to Rumi and Love's connection to God", South Florida Sun-Sentinel, 12 July 2002; p. 3 .
- Pecquet, Julian, "Mayor's Summit Continues", Tallahassee Democrat, 31 October 2006; p. 1 (front page).
- Pecquet, Julian, "Poet's Message of Peace Resonates at Summit", Tallahassee Democrat, 31 October 2006; p. B-1.
- H.E. Ambassador Professor Ravan Farhadi Comments
- Pars Times
- Naini, Majid, "Rumi and Global Peace"
- Naini, Majid, "From Molana with Love", Iran Times, 21 March 2008; p. 12 (full page).
- Chanticleer Press Release
- Naini, Majid, "N-Dimensions, Parallel Realities, and Their Relations to Human Perception and Development", Journal of Integrated Design & Process Science, Vol. 13, No. 1, pp. 49–61, March 2009.
- Naini, Majid, "A new transdisciplinary paradigm in relation to the latest discoveries in science and technology", Journal of Integrated Systems, Design, and Process Science, Vol. 12, No. 1, pp. 1–11, March 2008.
- Iran: A Celebration of Art and Culture - PBS special
