= Zakia Zouanat =

Moroccan anthropologist (1957–2012)

Portrait of Zaki Zouanat

Zakia Zouanat (1957 – 30 August 2012) was a Moroccan anthropologist. A researcher at the Institute of African Studies at Mohammed V University, she was an expert in Moroccan Sufism. Her research concerned biographic accounts of important Sufi figures in the 12th to 13th centuries. Zouanat sought to bridge Moroccans educated in French who accessed their religions through Arabic texts. As evidenced by her commentary on the Delos Initiative, she actively sought to promulgate the protection of pilgrimage sites important to Moroccan Sufis, as well as provide context for economic and cultural relevance.

== Works ==
- Ibn Mashish: Maître d'al-Shadili [Ibn Mashish: Master of al-Shadhili], Najah El Jadida, 1998
- (trans.) Paroles d'or de ‘Abd al-‘Azîz al-Dabbâgh: enseignements consignés par son disciple Ibn Mubârak al-Lamtî [Golden words of ‘Abd al-‘Azîz al-Dabbâgh: Lessons recorded by his disciple Ibn Mubârak al-Lamtî], Beirut, 2001.
- Soufisme: quête de lumière [Sufism: a quest for light], preface by Ahmed Toufiq, Koutoubia, 2009
- Le Royaume des Saints [The Kingdom of the Saints], 2011
