= Husam al-Din Chalabi =

Turkish Muslim Sufi and a prominent disciple of Rumi

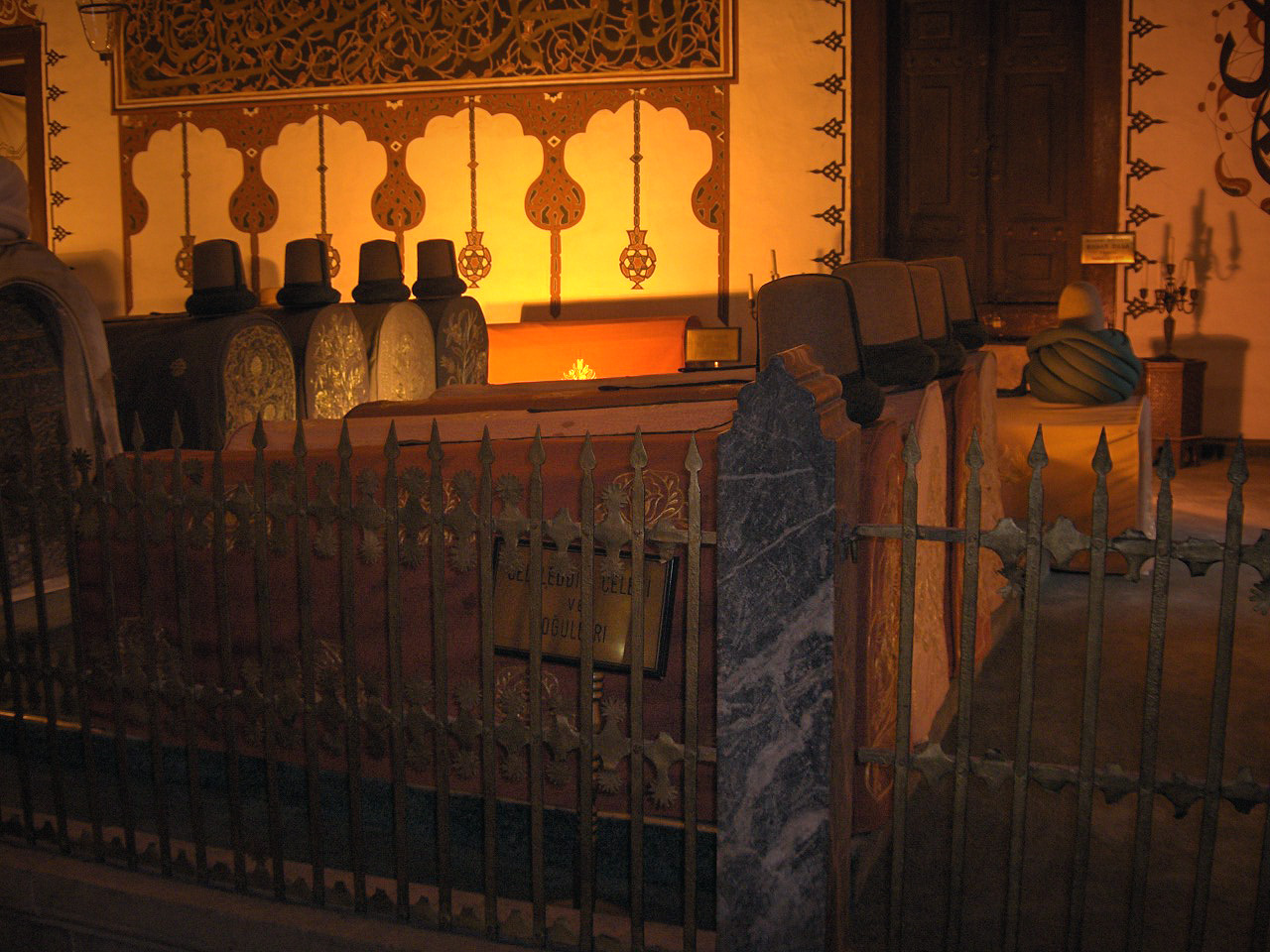
- Husam al-Din Chalabi's tomb in Konya, Turkey
- Title: Sheikh

Personal life
- Born: c. 1225 Konya, Turkey
- Died: 1284 Konya, Turkey
- Resting place: Konya, Turkey
- Main interest(s): Sufism, poetry, spiritual teachings
- Notable idea: Encouraged Rumi to write the Masnavi
- Notable work: Contributions to the Masnavi
- Known for: Prominent disciple of Rumi, contributor to the Masnavi
- Occupation: Sufi, disciple, writer

Religious life
- Religion: Islam
- Creed: Sufism

Senior posting
- Influenced by: Rumi, Shams Tabrizi
- Influenced: Sultan Walad

Husam al-Din Chalabi, Ebn Akhi Tork (Persian: حسام الدین چلبی, Kurdish: حوسامەدین چەلەبی, Turkish: Hüsameddin Çelebi) was a Kurdish Muslim Sufi and a prominent disciple of Rumi. He encouraged Rumi to create his famous work Masnavi and contributed to writing and editing the book. Rumi repeatedly praised Husam al-Din in his poetry and letters.

Husam al-Din is supposed to have been born in Konya around 1225. His grandfather was a Kurdish Sufi originally from Urmia and buried in Baghdad. Some have recorded his grandfather's name as Shaykh Taj al-Din Abu al-Wafa. In the preface of Masnavi-e-Ma'navi, Rumi quotes this Shaykh saying "Last night I was Kurdish, and this morning I became Arab." Husam al-Din became a disciple of Rumi in Konya. Later in 1273, after Rumi's death, he became his successor. He remained in this position until his death in 1284 when he was succeeded by Rumi's son Sultan Walad.
