= Radio Farhang =

Ownership
- Owner: Islamic Republic of Iran Broadcasting (IRIB, Radio Farhang - Culture Radio) {رادیو فرهنگ

Technical information
- Transmitter coordinates: 36°01′10″N 50°23′34″E

Radio Farhang is a radio station in Tehran, Iran, owned by Islamic Republic of Iran Broadcasting.
