= Franklin Lewis =

American academic (died 2022)

- Born: July 24, 1961; Lexington, Virginia
- Died: September 19, 2022 (aged 61); Chicago, Illinois
- Organization: American Institute of Iranian Studies
- Spouse: Foruzan Lewis
- Parents: Robert Lewis (father); Anne White Lewis (mother)

Academic background
- Education: University of California, Berkeley (BA, 1983); University of Chicago (PhD, 1995)
- Thesis: Reading, Writing, and Recitation: Sanā’i and The Origins of the Persian Ghazal

Academic work
- Institutions: Emory University; University of Chicago
- Notable works: Rumi: Past and Present, East and West, The Life Teachings of Jalāl al-Din Rumi (2008)

Franklin D. Lewis (1961 - 2022) was an Associate Professor of Persian Language and Literature, and Chair of the Department of Near Eastern Languages and Civilizations at the University of Chicago with affiliations to the Center for Middle Eastern Studies at the University of Chicago. He taught classes on Persian language and literature, medieval Islamic thought, Sufism, Baha'i Studies, translation studies, and Iranian cinema.

Lewis died after a long illness on September 19, 2022.

== Biography ==
Lewis studied at U.C. Berkeley and completed his graduate work in the Department of Near Eastern Languages and Civilizations at the University of Chicago. His dissertation on the life and works of the 12th-century mystical poet Sana'i, and the establishment of the ghazal genre in Persian literature, won the Foundation of Iranian Studies best dissertation prize in 1995.

Lewis previously taught Persian at Emory University, in the Department of Middle Eastern and South Asian Studies. He founded Adabiyat, an international discussion forum on the literatures of the Islamic World (including Arabic, Persian, Turkish, and Urdu) and was President of the American Institute of Iranian Studies (2002-2012 and 2016 to 2020) and directed the Persian Circle (انجمن سخن فارسی/anjamun e sohkan e farsi) at the University of Chicago.

== Published works ==
- Guest edited special issue of Iranian Studies (v48, #3, 2015) on Ferdowsi's Shahnameh as World Literature
- Translation of Mohammad Ali Jamalzadeh, Maʽsumeh of Shiraz, (1954 Persian novella معصومه شیرازی/), Association for the Study of Persian Literature, 2013)
- Things We Left Unsaid, Zoya Pirzad (2002 Persian novel چراغ ها را من خاموش می کنم/Cheraghha ra man khamush mikonam, Tehran: Nashr-e Markaz), English translation by Franklin Lewis (London: Oneworld Classics, May 2012).
- Mystical Poems of Rumi, translated by A.J. Arberry. Corrected one-volume edition with foreword by Franklin Lewis (Chicago: University of Chicago Press, 2009), 439pp.
- Rumi: Swallowing the Sun (Oxford: Oneworld, 2008), xxxiii+207pp. (Translation of selected poems of Jalâl al-Din Rumi, arranged by persona/voice/mode and with translation, notes and introduction).
- The Necklace of the Pleiades: Studies in Persian Literature and Culture, edited by Franklin Lewis and Sunil Sharma (Amsterdam: Rozenberg and Purdue University Press, 2007; new edition, Amsterdam University Press and Leiden University Press, 2010), 370pp.
- The Colossal Elephant and His Spiritual Feats: Shaykh Ahmad-e Jâm. The Life and Legendary Vita of a Popular Sufi Saint of the 12th Century. Edited and translated by Heshmat Moayyad and Franklin Lewis (Costa Mesa, CA: Mazda Publishers, 2004), 460pp.
- Rumi: Past and Present, East and West. The Life Teachings and Poetry of Jalâl al-Din Rumi. Foreword by Julie Meisami (Oxford: One World Publications, 2000), xvii+686pp. Reprints 2001, 2003. Revised expanded edition, 2007. Awards: British Society for Middle Eastern Studies, British-Kuwaiti Friendship Society for the Best Book in Middle Eastern Studies published in the UK in 2000; Encyclopædia Iranica Foundation, 2001; Saidi-Sirjani Award (Hon. Mention), Society of Iranian Studies, 2004.
  - Mowlavi: Diruz o emruz, sharq o gharb, Persian translation by Farhād Farahmandfar (Tehran: Nashr-e Sāles, 1383 Sh./ 2004).
  - Mowlānā: diruz tā emruz, sharq tā gharb, collaborative Persian translation by Hassan Lahouti with Franklin Lewis, including author's preface to the translation (Tehran: Nashr-e Nāmak, 1384 Sh./2005; 2nd ed., 1385 Sh./2006.
  - Mevlânâ: Geçmiş ve şimdi, Doğu ve Batı (Mevlânâ Celâleddin Rumi'nin Hayatı, öğretisi ve şiiri, Turkish Trans. by (Hamide Kokuyan &) Gül Çağali Güven, ed. Safi Argapus (Istanbul: Kabalcı Yayınevi, 2010).
  - Rumi før og nu, Øst og Vest. Jalal al-Din Rumis liv, lære og digtning. Danish translation by Rasmus Chr. Elling. Carsten Niebuhr Biblioteket (Copenhagen: Forlaget Vandkunsten, 2010).
- In a Voice of Their Own: A Collection of Stories by Iranian Women written since the Revolution of 1979, edited and translated, with introduction and annotated bibliography by Franklin Lewis and Farzin Yazdanfar (Costa Mesa, CA: Mazda Publishers, 1996). liv+153pp.

== See also ==
- Center for Middle Eastern Studies at the University of Chicago
