= Sultan Walad =

Founder of the Mevlevi Order (died 1312)

Baha al-Din Muhammad-i Walad
- بهاءالدین محمد ولد
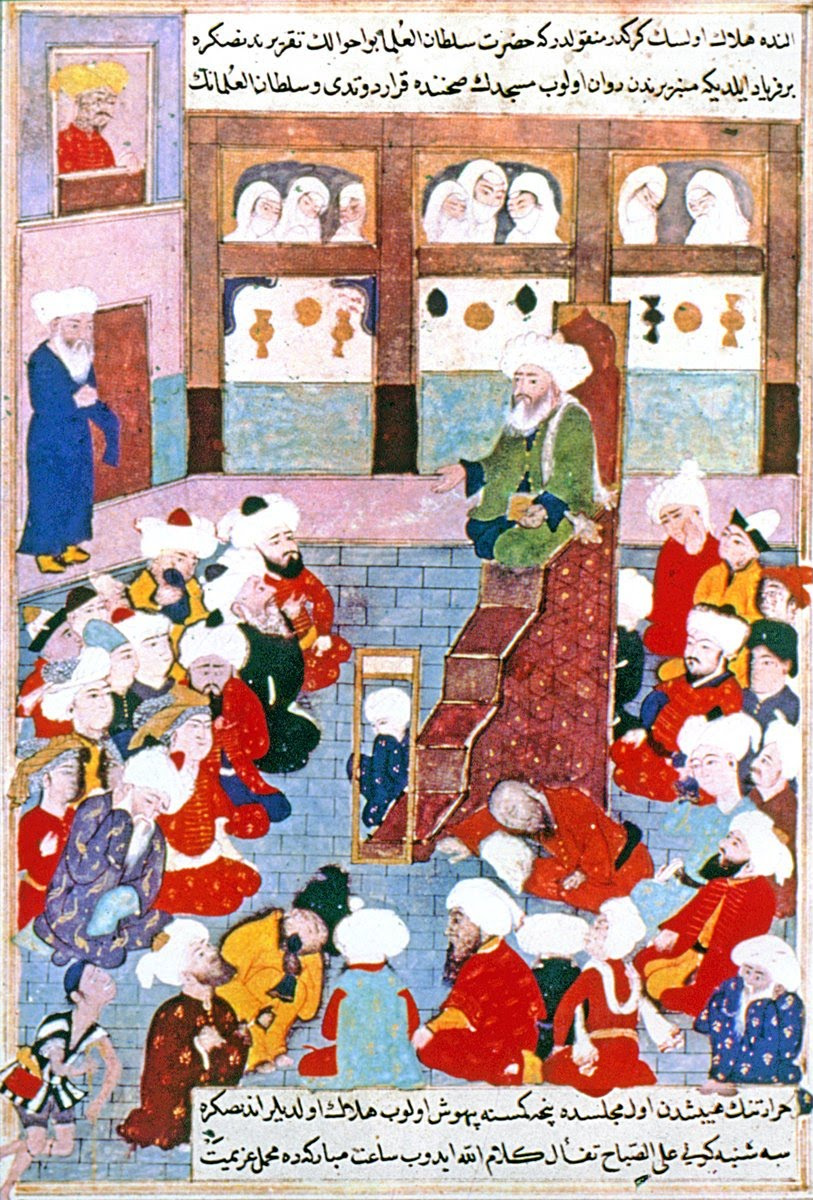
- Sultan Walad preaching in Balkh. Illustration from a manuscupt of the Jami' al-Siyar, created in Baghdad, c. 1600
- Title: Sultan Walad

Personal life
- Born: 1227
- Died: 1312 (aged 84–85)
- Parents: Rumi (father); Gawhar Khatun (mother)
- Era: Islamic Golden Age
- Main interest(s): Sufism, Sufi literature

Religious life
- Religion: Islam
- Denomination: Sunni
- Jurisprudence: Hanafi
- Tariqa: Mevlevi
- Creed: Maturidi

Muslim leader
- Influenced by: Rumi
- Arabic name
- Personal (Ism): Muḥammad محمد
- Patronymic (Nasab): ibn Muḥammad ibn Muḥammad ibn al-Ḥusayn ibn Aḥmad بن محمد بن محمد بن الحسين بن أحمد
- Epithet (Laqab): Bahā ad-Dīn بهاء الدين
- Toponymic (Nisba): ar-Rūmī الرومي al-Khaṭībī الخطيبي al-Balkhī البلخي al-Bakrī البكري

Baha al-Din Muhammad-i Walad (Persian: بهاءالدین محمد ولد, 1227-1312), better known as Sultan Walad (سلطان ولد), was a Sufi and scholar. The eldest son of Rumi, he became one of the founders of the Mevlevi Order.

== Life and impact ==
Sultan Walad was born around 1227 to Rumi and his wife Gawhar Khatun, daughter of the Lala Sharaf-ud-Din of Samarkand.

He was given the name of his grandfather Baha al-Din Walad. Jalal al-Din Rumi sent Sultan Walad and his brother Ala al-Din Muhammad to Aleppo and Damascus for Islamic studies. Sultan Walad was sent by Rumi to seek Shams Tabrizi, who had disappeared.

Sultan Walad married the daughter of Salah al-Din Zarkub, Fatima Khatun. He and Fatima had two daughters and one son, Jalal al-Din Arif. One of his granddaughters was Mutahhare Abide Hatun, who married Suleiman of Germiyan and was mother of Devletsah Sultan Hatun, wife of Ottoman Sultan Bayezid I.

He erected a mausoleum for his father, which also became the center of his order. He died at the age of nearly ninety years on 10 Radjab 712/12 November 1312 in Konya and was buried next to his father.

== Written work ==
Sultan Walad, like his father, was a prolific poet and left a considerable Persian literary heritage.

=== Ibtida Nama (The book of the beginning) ===
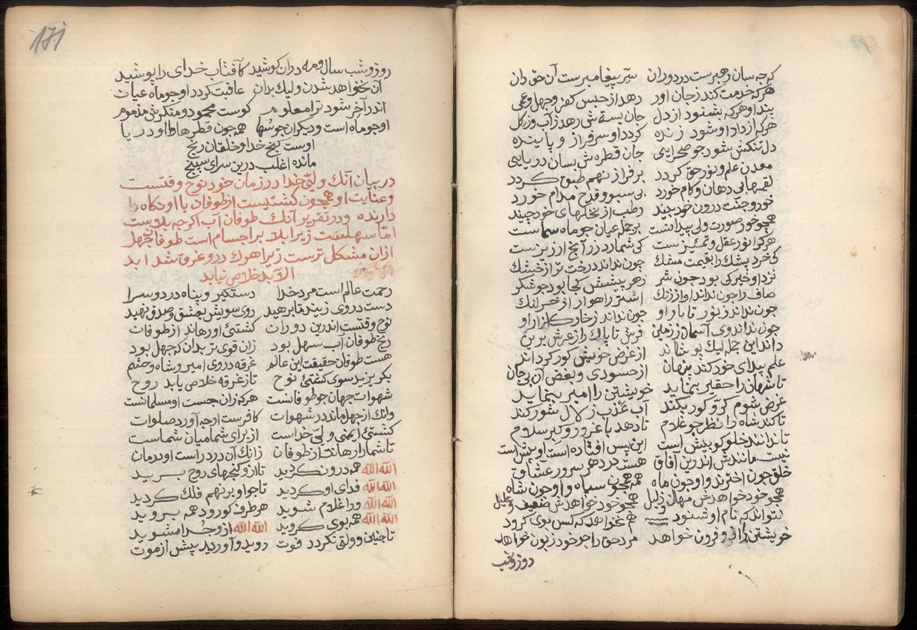
A copy of Ibtida Nama (date unknown)

The first Persian poetic verse book of Sultan Walad, in the style Mathnawi (a type of Persian verse) is the Ibtidā-nāma (The book of the beginning), also called Walad-nāma (The book of Walad) or Mat̲h̲nawī-yi Waladī. Composed around 1291, it is written in the meter of the Hadiqe of Sanai. It constitutes an important source for the biographies of Baha al-din (Rumi’s father) and Mawlānā (Rumi) as well as for the early history of the order. It chronicles the history of the Mawlawwiya order, as well as focusing primarily on Rumi. It also describes the predecessors and successors of Rumi. One of the students of Rumi, Salah al-Din Zarkub who had a close spiritual relationship with Sultan Walad is also mentioned. This work provides a first hand account by Rumi’s son who was very close to many of the events described in the book. Overall, it is a hagiographical book, and promotes an image of Rumi as a miracle-working saint. It also provides a first hand account of the Mawlawwiya order and the major personages associated with its history, including Baha al-Din, Borhan alDin, Shams, Rumi, Salah al-Din Zarkub, Hosam al-din and finally Sultan Wad. The work contains over 9000 lines of poetry in Persian. A first critical edition was produced by the Iranian scholar Jalal al-Din Homai in 1937. A French translation appeared in 1988 through the efforts of Djamchid Mortazavi and Eva de Vitray-Meyerovitch as ‘’La Parole secrete: l’enseignement du maitre Soufi Rumi’’.

=== Rabab-nama ===
(Persian: رباب نامه) Rabāb-nāma, a Persian Mathnawai, was composed, at the behest of a notable, within five months of the year 700/1301 in the meterr ramal of his father's Mathnawī. It contains 7745 lines in Persian, 35 in Arabic, 22 in Greek and 157 in Turkish. A critical edition was prepared by Ali Soltani Gordfaramazi in 1980 and published in Montreal as a collaborative effort between McGill University’s Institute of Islamic Studies and the University of Tehran under the title: ‘’Rabāb-nāma az Sultan Walad, Farzand-e Mowlana Jalal al-Din Mowlavi’’. Sultan Walad composed the Rabāb-nāma between April and August 1301 at the request of certain saint whom Sultan Walad repeatedly praises in the text. This “man of God” approached Sultan Walad with the suggestion that since had already produced a Mathnawi in the meter of Sanai’s Hadiqe, he should now set to work on a mathwnawi in the same meter as the Mathnawi of his father, Rumi.

Sultan Walad beings this work in an imitation of the song of the reed flute (Persian: Nay) at the beginning of the Mathnawi, but instead has the Rabāb start the opening tale:

“Hear in the cry and wail of the Rabāb

A hundred chapters on the depth of love”

At one point Sultan Walad references his fathers work as being “sent-down”, suggesting he regarded Rumi’s writing as quasi-divinely inspired.

=== Intiha-nama ===
(Persian: انتها نامه) The Intihā-nāma is another Persian Mathnawi. It was composed for the purposes, and is a kind of summary of the first two mathnawī (Ibtida Nama and Rabab Nama). It contains about 8300 lines of poetry.

=== Diwan-i Walad ===
(Persian: دیوان ولد) The Diwan of Sultan, in Persian contains 9256 Ghazals and Qasida, and 455 quatrains. Approximately there are 12500 lines. Sultan Walad describes this as his first literary work, but he continued to add to it until his death. The Diwan has been published under the title: "Divan-e Soltan Walad, ed. Said Nafisi (Tehran, Rudaki, 1959).

=== Ma’arif-i Waladi (The Waladi Gnosis) ===
(Persian: معارف ولدی) Also called al-Asrār al-d̲j̲alāliyya. It is a Persian prose work in a style approaching the spoken language and containing accounts of Sulṭān Walad's thoughts and words. The title is an evocation of his grandfather's work by the same title. An uncritical edition appeared as an appendix to an undated Tehran print of Mawlānā's Fīhi mā fīh; a scholarly edition was prepared by Nadjib Mayil-i Hirawi, Ma'arif, Tehran 1367/1988. A collection of 56 of his sermons and lectures in the book demonstrates that he spoke from the pulpit in a straightforward and enganing manner. Sultan Walad punctuated his discourses with lines of verse from Persian poets such as Sana’i, Attar and his own father, Rumi. The Ma’arif has been pubhsed under the title "Ma’aref-e Baha al-Din Muhammad b. Jlal al-Din Muhammad Balkhi, Manshur beh Sultan Walad, edited by Najib Mayer Haravi (Tehran, Mowla, 1988)

=== Turkish and Greek poems ===
Besides approximately 38,000 lines of Persian poetry in Sultan Walad’s work, in the Rababb Nama there are 22 lines in Greek and 157 in Turkish. In the Diwan-I Walad, there are 15 Ghazals in Turkish besides the approximately 9200 Ghazals and Qasida in Persian, and four Ghazals in Greek. In the Ibitda Nama, there are 27 verses in Greek Thus Sultan Valad composed approximately 300 verses in Greek and Turkish.

Sultan Walad admits to his poor knowledge of Greek and Turkish. For example, in his Ebteda-Nama, Sultan Walad admits twice in Persian after some of the lines in Greek/Turkish:

بگذر از گفت ترکی و رومی

که از این اصطلاح محرومی

گوی از پارسی و تازی

که در این دو همی خوش تازی

Translation:

Let go of the languages of Greek (Rumi) and Turkish (Turki)

Because you lack knowledge in these two,

Thus speak in Persian and Arabic,

Since in these two, you recite very well.

And also elsewhere in Ghazal in his Diwan, he writes: If I knew Turkish, I would have brought one to a thousand. But when you listen to Persian, I tell the secrets much better.

He also says: If I had known Turkish, I would have told you, the secrets that God had imparted on Me.

According to Mehmed Fuad Köprülü, the Turkish poems are: Written in a very crude and primitive manner and with a very defective and rudimentary versification replete with zihaf (pronouncing long vowels short) and imalā (pronouncing a short vowel long). Also according to Mehmed Fuad Koprulu: Sultan Walad’s motivation in writing Turkish poetry, just as it was with composing and reciting Persian poetry, was to raise the religious consciousness of the people of Anatolia, to guide them and instill in them a sense of the greatness of Mawlana and The fact he occasionally resorted to Turkish derives from his fear that a large majority who did not undesrand Persian, would be deprived of these teaching.

Also the Greek verses gives us one of the earliest specimen of Islamic poetry in the Greek languages, and some of the earliest extensive attestation of Cappadocian Greek.

== Legacy ==
Sultan Walad was instrumental in laying down the Mawlawiya order and expanding the teaching of his father throughout Anatolia and the rest of the Muslim world. Annemarie Schimmel stated:

I have always wondered what kind of Person Sultan Walad was the obedient son who never contradicted his father (unlike his younger brother, 'Ala al-Din, Shams al-Din's bitter enemy), and who tried to fulfill all of his wishes. Sultan Walad must have had a very strong personality to be able to carry out his duties and, toward the end of his life, to integrate his experience into the formation of the Mevlevi order. I know of only one other case in the history of Sufism which attests such a loving, complete surrender of a son to his father.

== In popular culture ==
In the 2023 biographical series Mevlana Celâleddin-i Rumi, the role of Sultan Walad is portrayed by actor Yusuf Çim.
