= Jean-Yves Leloup =

French theologian and writer

- Born: 1950 (age 75–76); Angers, France
- Occupations: Priest, Theologian, Translator

Jean-Yves Leloup is a French theologian, writer, translator of Greek and Coptic language texts, born in 1950 in Angers. He is the author of over ninety books in French, some translated into other languages, including English, German, Spanish and Portuguese.The primary subject of his writings is Christian spirituality.

He has translated and commented on the apocryphal gospels from the Nag Hammadi library according to Thomas, Philip and Mary (Mary Magdalene), as well as the Gospel according to John and the Apocalypse. He also explores the meditative and monastic traditions of the Orthodox Church (Hesychasm) and the teachings of the Fathers of the Church, especially the Desert Fathers, in particular Evagrius Ponticus. He investigates the role of the Feminine in the history of Christianity and considers the dialogue with other spiritual traditions.

== Biography ==
Jean-Yves Leloup was born in 1950 in Angers. Theologian, novelist and essayist, initiated into Buddhism, trained at Mount Athos, became a Dominican priest, then became Orthodox. A pioneer of transpersonal psychology and founder of the Institute for the Encounter and Study of Civilizations (ecumenism) and of the International College of Therapists (special help for the dying), he shares some "fragments of his itinerance" in his 1991 autobiography L'Absurde et la Grâce.

Converted at the age of 20, he discovered Christianity at Mount Athos through Orthodoxy, before entering the Dominican Order. He was trained in theology and ordained a priest at the Dominican convent in Toulouse in June 1978. He further studied psychology in a New York university (Syracuse), spent some time in California and attended Karlfried Graf Dürckheim’s center for initiatory psychotherapy in Germany.

From 1981 onward, he was responsible, with other religious and seculars, for the International Center, "university of the third millennium", dedicated to the spiritual and the inter-cultural, opened to the welcoming of oriental spiritual traditions at the former Dominican hostelry of the Sainte-Baume. This represented a challenge for the Catholic Church, while at the same time, Interfaith dialogue was encouraged by the Council and was soon to be given an expression, by Pope John Paul II in Assisi at the first World Day of Prayer for Peace. Meanwhile, the Dominicans were driven by another project; That of a return to the roots and a re-capture of the local population. "The Christian qualification of the Center was therefore challenged by the provincial of the Dominican order and the bishop of Toulon, Monseigneur Madec".

Jean-Yves Leloup left the Dominican order in 1986. Historian Olivier Chatelan indicates that the fact that he was married and had a child, was brought to the attention of the Dominican authorities, he therefore "should no longer be considered a Dominican". He had to give up the functions he held at the International Center of the Sainte-Baume, while "sympathizers came to his cause".

Having been previously baptized Orthodox in the Monastic Republic of Mount Athos, he joined the French Orthodox Church of the Communion of Western Orthodox Churches; Where he is known under his religious name of Father Jean Seraphim in the church of Saint-Michel (Var).

== Books in English ==
- Leloup, Jean-Yves (1996). The wisdom of Jesus. Translated by John O'Toole. Abbeville Press. OCLC 34623217.
- Leloup, Jean-Yves (2002). The gospel of Mary Magdalene. Translated by Joseph Rowe. Inner Traditions and Simon and Schuster. OCLC 48557495.
- Leloup, Jean-Yves (2003). Being still : reflections on an ancient mystical tradition. Translated by Martin S. Laird (O.S.A). Paulist Press. OCLC 50422828.
- Leloup, Jean-Yves (2004). The gospel of Philip : Jesus, Mary Magdalene, and the gnosis of sacred union. Translated by Joseph Rowe. Inner Traditions and Simon and Schuster. OCLC 56582819.
- Leloup, Jean-Yves (2005). The Gospel of Thomas : the gnostic wisdom of Jesus. Translated by Joseph Rowe. Inner Traditions and Simon and Schuster. OCLC 57134406. (Foreword by Jacob Needleman)
- Leloup, Jean-Yves (2006). The sacred embrace of Jesus and Mary : the sexual mystery at the heart of the Christian tradition. Translated by Joseph Rowe. Inner Traditions and Simon and Schuster. OCLC 62342712.
- Leloup, Jean-Yves (2007). Judas and Jesus : two faces of a single revelation. Translated by Joseph Rowe. Inner Traditions and Simon and Schuster. OCLC 71800486.
- Leloup, Jean-Yves (2009). Compassion and meditation : the spiritual dynamic between Buddhism and Christianity. Translated by Joseph Rowe. Inner Traditions and Simon and Schuster. OCLC 264023258.
