= Sunan al-Tirmidhi =

Fourth hadith collection of the Six Books of Sunni Islam

Sahih al-Tirmidhi
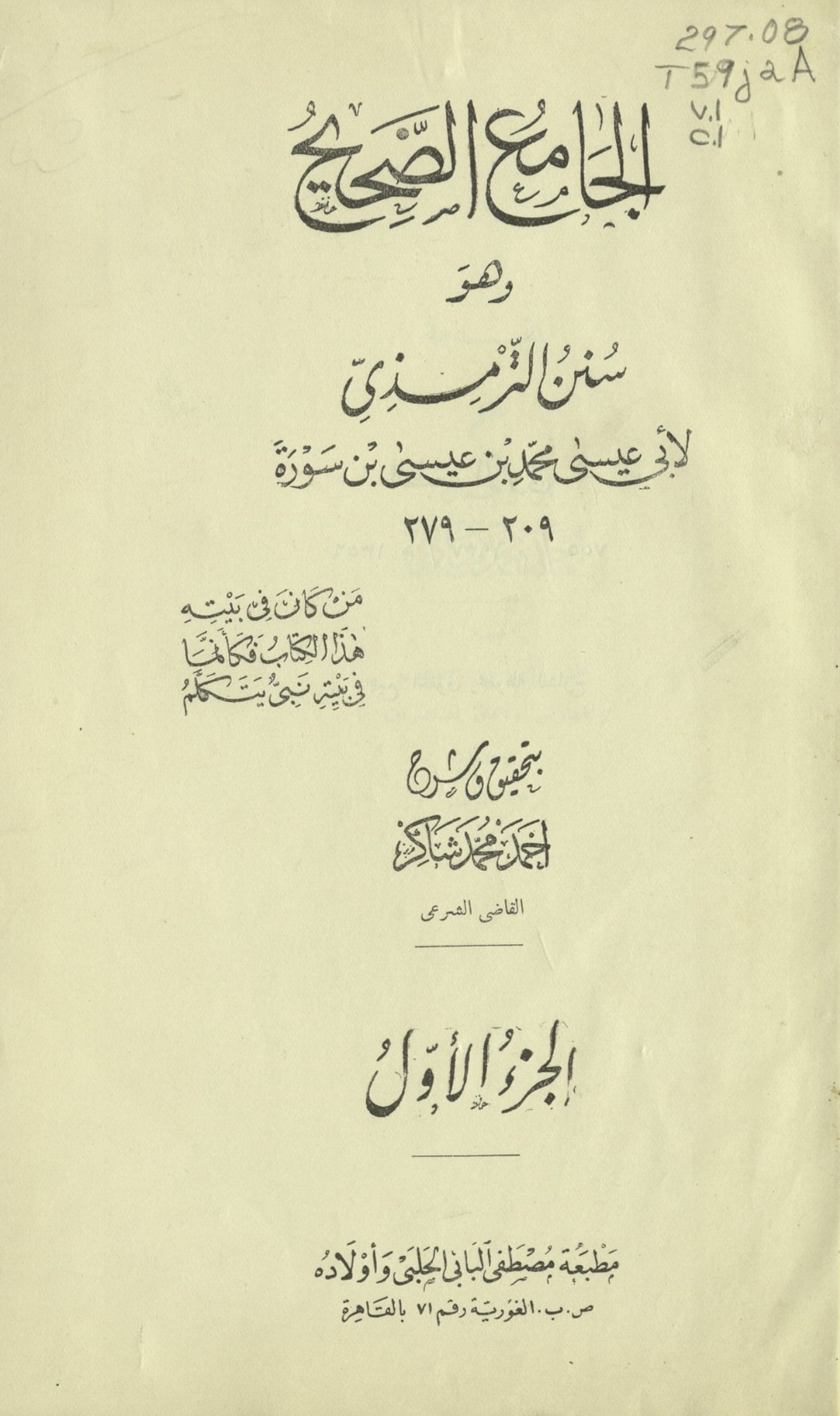
- Author: Al-Tirmidhi
- Language: Arabic
- Series: Kutub al-Sittah
- Genre: Hadith collection
- Published: 9th century

Sunan al-Tirmidhi (Arabic: سنن الترمذي, romanized: Sunan al-Tirmidhī) is the fourth hadith collection of the Six Books of Sunni Islam. It was compiled by Islamic scholar al-Tirmidhi in c. 864–884 (250–270 AH).

== Title ==
The full title of the compilation is al-jāmiʿ al-mukhtaṣar min as-sunan ʿan Rasūl Allāh ṣallā-llāhu ʿalayhi wasallama wa maʿrifat al-saḥīḥ wal-maʿlūl wa mā ʿalayhil al-ʿamal (Arabic: الجامع المختصر من السنن عن رسول الله صلى الله عليه وسلم ومعرفة الصحيح والمعلول وما عليه العمل). It is shortened to al-jāmiʿ al-saḥīḥ, al-jāmiʿ al-sunan, al-jāmiʿ al-Tirmidhī, al-sunan al-Tirmidhī or Ṣaḥīḥ al-Tirmidhī.

The term Jami within the title indicates a complete collection covering all eight Risalah (Allah's message) subjects. The term Sunan within the title refers to the collection's focus and chapter arrangement based on the particular Risalah subject, ahkam (general law). Al-Kattani said: "The Jamiʿ of at-Tirmidhi is also named The Sunan, contrary to those thinking them to be two separate books, and [it is also named] Al-Jamiʿ al-Kabir.

Since the book is considered by most Sunnis to be the most authentic after Sahih al-Bukhari and Sahih Muslim, this was dubbed by later scholars as Ṣaḥīḥ al-Tirmidhī.

== Compilation and description ==
He began compiling it after the year 864/5 AD (250 AH) and completed it on the 9 June 884 AD (10 Dhu al-Hijjah 270 AH).

It contains about 4330 ahadith (now roughly 4400), and has been divided into fifty chapters—disputed as 46 books.

== Reception ==
Ibn al-Athir said: "(It) is the best of books, having the most benefit, the best organization, with the least repetition. It contains what others do not; like mention of the different views, angles of argument, and clarifying the circumstances of the hadith as being sahih, da'if, or gharib, as well as disparaging and endorsing remarks (regarding narrators)."

== Authenticity ==
Sunnis regard this collection as fifth in strength of their six major hadith collections. Ibn al-Jawzi stated that there are twenty-three or thirty forged hadith in it. Some scholars like al-Suyuti have criticised Ibn al-Jawzi's findings as being too strict, concluding that there are no fabricated hadith in the Jami. The 20th-century Albanian Islamic scholar al-Albani identified sixteen fabricated hadith.

=== Ibn Hazm's opinion ===
It was narrated from Ibn Al-Qattan Al-Fasi that Ibn Hazm said in his now lost book, Al-Isaal, that Al-Tirmidhi's position was Majhul or unknown. What is usually the case with narrators that are unknown is that they are rejected as being authentic. This peculiar and seemingly bizarre view of Ibn Hazm regarding Al-Tirmidhi's status in Hadith was also recorded by Al-Dhahabi in his book, Tarikh Al-Islam, and he said the following:

What is astonishing is Abu Muhammad Ibn Hazm, where he says about Abu 'Isa [i.e. Al-Tirmidhi]: '[He is] unknown,' as mentioned in the book Al-Isaal.

In an attempt to try to defend Ibn Hazm, Al-Dhahabi made the point that the Jami' of Tirmidhi hadn't reached Andalusia until after Ibn Hazm's death. This claim, however, doesn't stand. What seems to be the case is that the book had reached Al-Andalus even before Ibn Hazm's birth.

Of the scholars who studied Al-Tirmidhi's Sunan in Al-Andalus was Ibn Al-Fardhi Al-Maliki, Ibn Hazm's teacher, and he praised Al-Tirmidhi's status in his book "Al-Mu'talif wal-Mukhtalif." Among other scholars, there was Yahya bin Muhammad al-Jayyani, who died in 390 AH, six years after Ibn Hazm's birth. Ibn 'Abd al-Barr used to narrate Al-Tirmidhi's reports through al-Jayyani, and he even mentioned Al-Tirmidhi in his book "Al-Tamhid". Ibn Hazm himself also reviewed the book, making him aware of Al-Tirmidhi's narrations, thus refuting the claim of Al-Dhahabi that the book hadn't made it to Al-Andalus before Ibn Hazm's death.

Ibn Kathir also mentioned Ibn Hazm's opinion of Al-Tirmidhi, but misunderstood what was transmitted by Ibn Al-Qattan and claimed that Ibn Hazm made Al-Tirmidhi Majhul in his Al-Muhalla. However, there is no mention of this, and his ranking as unknown was only recorded in Al-Isaal, and not in any other work.

=== Types of hadith included relating to their authenticity ===
Of the four Sunan books, al-Tirmidhi's alone is divided into four categories. The first, those hadith definitively classified as authentic, he is in agreement with Bukhari and Muslim b. al-Hajjaj. The second category are those hadith which conform to the standard of the three scholars, al-Tirmidhi, al-Nasa'i and Abu Dawood, at a level less than Bukhari and Muslim b. al-Hajjaj. Third, are the hadith collected due to a contradiction; in this case, he clarifies its flaw. And fourth, those hadith which some fiqh specialists have acted upon.

== Contents ==
Editor, Ahmad Muhammad Shakir's 1937–65, Cairo publication, in 5 volumes, provides the standard topical classification of the hadith Arabic text. The book is divided into 49 chapters.

== Commentaries ==
- Aridhat al-Ahwathi bi Sharh Sunan al-Tirmidhi written Ibn al-Arabi d. 543H (1148–49 CE)
- Sharh Jaami' al-Tirmidhi of which only the last portion of remains – Sharh 'Ilal at-Tirmidhi – by Ibn Rajab
- Al-Kawakib al-Durri sharh Jami al-Tirmidhi by Rashid Ahmad Gangohi
- Commentary on al-Tirmidhi's Hadith Collection by al-Zayn al-Iraqi
- Footnotes, including explanation and verification, of approximately the first third of the Sunan by Ahmad Muhammad Shakir
- Al-Arf al-Shadhi sharh Sunan al-Tirmidhi by Anwar Shah Kashmiri
- Maarif al-Sunan sharh Sunan al-Tirmidhi by Yusuf Banuri
- Tuhfat Al-Ahwadhi Bi Sharh Jamiʿ Al-Tirmidhi by 'Abd al-Rahman al-Mubarkafuri, ed. 'Abd al-Rahman Muhammad 'Uthman, 10 vols., Beirut
- Kifayat al-Mughtadhi fi Sharh Jami' al-Tirmidhi by Shykh Abdul Matin kumillai, in 17 volumes, published by Muassasa Ilmiyah Bangladesh, Dakha, Bangladesh.
- Tuhfat-ul-almai sharh Sunan al-Trimizi By Mufti Saeed Ahmed Palanpuri
- Fuyoodh Un Nabi, Sharh Jami Al Tirmidhi (in Urdu Language) by Allama Mufti Muhammad Arshad ul Qadri, Taleem wo Tarbiyat Publisher, Lahore, Pakistan

== See also ==
- Sahih al-Bukhari
- Sahih Muslim
- Sunan Abu Dawood
- Sunan al-Nasa'i
- Sunan ibn Majah
- Muwatta Imam Malik
