= Ibn Hazm bibliography =

Works by Andalusian Muslim polymath (994–1064)

The canon of work by Ibn Hazm, prolific and important Andalusian jurist, belletrist, and heresiographer is extensive. He was said to have written over 400 books.

== Works ==
=== Al-Dhahabi's account ===
Al-Dhahabi (1274-1348) gives the following list of ibn Hazm's work:

Title	Arabic	Translation^{a}	Date	Notes
Al-Isal ila Fahm Kitab al-Khisal	الإيصال إلى فهم كتاب الخصال	Reaching to Understanding the Book of Characters		15,000 folios.
Al-Khisal al-Hafiz li Jumal Shara'i` al-Islam	الخصال الحافظ لجمل شرائع الإسلام			in two volumes
Al-Mujalla				in two volumes
Al Kitab al-Muhallā bi'l Athār	المحلى بالآثار	"The Book Ornamented with Traditions"		in eight volumes
Hujja al-Wada`	حجة الوداع	Farewell Pilgrimage		in one volume, step-by-step retelling of the actual Farewell Pilgrimage
Qisma al-Khumus fi al-Radd `ala Isma`il al-Qadi	قسمة الخمس في الرد على إسماعيل القاضي			in one volume
Al-Athar al-Lati Zahiruha al-Ta`arud wa Nafyi al-Tanaqud `Anha	الآثار التي ظاهرها التعارض ونفي التناقض عنها			in 10,000 folios, unfinished
Al-Jami` Fi Sahih al-Hadith	الجامع في صحيح الحديث			without chains of transmission
Al-Talkhis wa al-Takhlis fi al-Masa'il al-Nazariyya	التلخيص والتخليص في المسائل النظرية			
Ma Infarada Bihi Malik aw Abu Hanifa aw al-Shafi`I	ما انفرد به مالك وأبو حنيفة والشافعي			
Ikhtilaf al-Fuqaha' al-Khamsa Malik wa Abi Hanifa wa al-Shafi`i wa Ahmad wa Dawud	اختلاف الفقهاء الخمسة مالك، وأبي حنيفة، والشافعي، وأحمد، وداود			
Al-Tasaffuh fi al-Fiqh	التصفح في الفقه			in one volume
Al-Tabyin fi Hal `Alima al-Mustafa A`yan al-Munafiqin	التبيين في هل علم المصطفى أعيان المنافقين			in 3 tomes
Al-Imla' fi Sharh al-Muwatta'	الإملاء في شرح الموطأ			in 1,000 folios
Al-Imla' fi Qawa`id al-Fiqh	الإملاء في قواعد الفقه			in 1,000 folios
Durr al-Qawa`id fi Fiqh al-Zahiriyya	در القواعد في فقه الظاهرية			in 1,000 folios
Maratib Al-Ijma`	مراتب الإجماع			in one small volume
Al-Fara'id	الفرائض			in one volume
Al-Risala al-Balqa' fi al-Radd `ala `Abd al-Haqq ibn Muhammad al-Saqali	الرسالة البلقاء في الرد على عبد الحق بن محمد الصقلي			in one small volume
Al-Ihkam fi Usul al-Ahkam	الإحكام في أصول الأحكام			in two volumes
Al-Fisal fi al-Milal wa al-Nihal	الفصل في الملل والأهواء والنحل	The Separator Concerning Religions, Heresies, and Sects		in two large volumes
Al-Radd `Ala man I`tarada `ala al-Fisal	الرد على من اعترض على الفصل			in one volume
Al-Yaqin fi Naqd al-Mu`tadhirin `an Iblis wa Sa'ir al-Mushrikin	اليقين في نقض تمويه المعتذرين عن إبليس وسائر المشركين			in one large volume
Al-Radd `ala Ibn Zakariyya al-Razi	الرد على ابن زكريا الرازي	"Refutation of Ibn Zakariyya al-Razi"		in 100 folios
Al-Tarshid fi al-Radd `Ala Kitab al-Farid li Ibn al-Rawandi fi I`tiradihi `ala al-Nubuwwat	الترشيد في الرد على كتاب الفريد لابن الراوندي في اعتراضه على النبوات			in one volume
Al-Akhlaq wa al-Siyar fi Mudawat al-Nufus	الأخلاق والسير في مداواة النفوس	Morals and Right Conduct in the Healing of Souls		Available in English
Ṭawq al-Ḥamāmah	طوق الحمامة	The Ring of the Dove		Available in English
Al-Radd `ala Man Kaffara al-Muta'awwilin min al-Muslimin	الرد على من كفر المتأولين من المسلمين			in one volume
Mukhtasar fi `Ilal al-Hadith	مختصر في علل الحديث			in one volume
Al-Taqrib li Hadd al-Mantiq bi al-Alfaz al-`Ammiyya	التقريب لحد المنطق بالألفاظ العامية	"The Scope of Logic"		in one volume
Al-Istijlab	الاستجلاب			in one volume
Nasab al-Barbar	نسب البربر			in one volume
Maratib al-'Ulum	مراتب العلوم	The Categories of the Sciences		
Naqt al-`Arus	نقط العروس			in one small volume

^a quotation marks are used when the translation is sufficiently literal

=== Other accounts ===
Other works have been attributed to Ibn Hazm as well. Abu Abd al-Rahman Ibn Aqil al-Zahiri, the primary biographer of Ibn Hazm in the modern era, attributed to Ibn Hazm an epistle in exegesis of the 94th verse of the chapter of Yunus in the Qur'an as well as an exposition of different world religions, though Ihsan Abbas mentions that the reference to these works is hard to find. Ibn Aqil has two large works covering both the influence of Ibn Hazm's common works and cataloging his rarities, Ibn Hazm khilal alfa 'aam and Nawadir al-imam Ibn Hazm respectively.
