= Ibn Hazm =

Andalusian Muslim polymath (994–1064)

Imam Ibn Hazm
- ٱبْن حَزْم
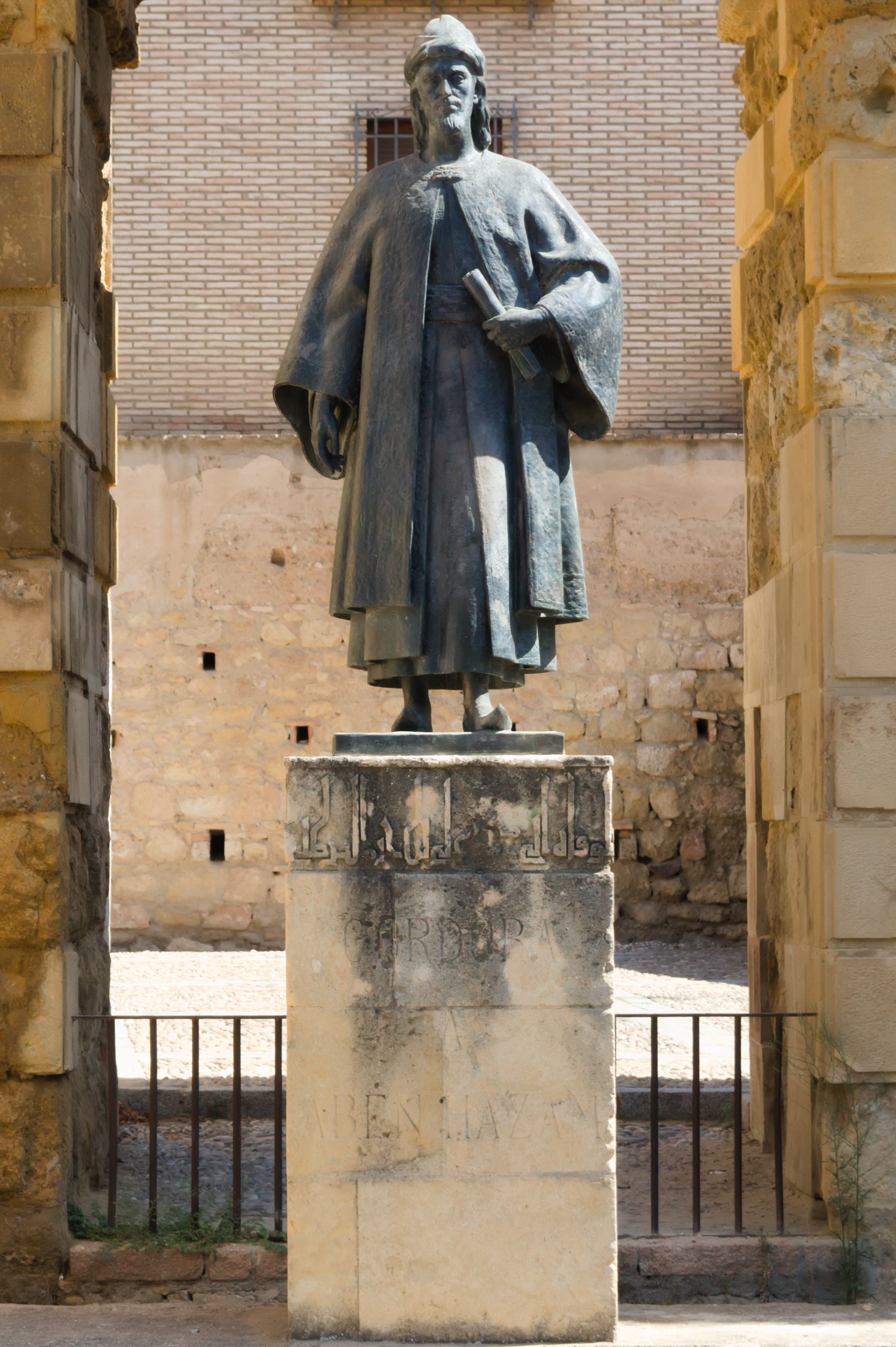
- A statue of Ibn Hazm standing in Córdoba, Spain
- Title: Imam; Allamah; Hafiz; Muhaddith; Faqih; Mujtahid; Ocean of Knowledge; Western trebuchet; Possessor of Sciences and Knowledge

Personal life
- Born: 7 November 994 CE (384 AH) Córdoba, Córdoban Caliphate
- Died: 15 August 1064 CE (456 AH) Montíjar, near Huelva, Taifa of Seville
- Era: Islamic Golden Age
- Region: Al-Andalus
- Main interests: Jurisprudence; Hadith; Islamic theology; Tafsir; Arabic grammar; Linguistic; genealogy; History; Logic; philosophy
- Notable works: Al-Fisal fi al-Milal wa-l-Nihal; al-Muhalla; al-Ihkam fi Usul al-Ahkam; Tawq al-Hamama
- Occupation: Polymath; scholar; traditionist; philosopher; theologian

Religious life
- Religion: Islam
- Denomination: Sunni
- Jurisprudence: Zahiri
- Creed: Independent

Muslim leader
- Influenced by: Muhammad; Dawud al-Zahiri; Baqi ibn Makhlad; Muhammad ibn Dawud al-Zahiri; Ibn al-Mughallis; Ibn Kullab; Epicurus; Prodicus
- Influenced: Followers of the Zahiri school; Ibn Khaldun; Ibn Taymiyya; Ibn Tumart; al-Shawkani; Rashid Rida; al-Albani; Ibn Arabi; Muhammad Asad; Muqbil ibn Hadi al-Wadi'i; Salafi movement
- Arabic name
- Personal (Ism): ʿAlī عَلِيّ
- Patronymic (Nasab): Ibn Aḥmad ibn Saʿīd ibn Ḥazm ibn Ghālib ibn Ṣāliḥ ibn Khalaf ibn Maʿdān ibn Sufyān ibn Yazīd ٱبْن أَحْمَد بْن سَعِيد بْن حَزْم بنِ غالِبِ بنِ صالِحِ بنِ خَلَفِ بنِ مَعْدانَ بنِ سُفْيانَ بنِ يَزِيدَ
- Teknonymic (Kunya): Abū Muḥammad أَبُو مُحَمَّد
- Toponymic (Nisba): al-Andalusī al-Fārisī al-Qurṭubī al-Lablī al-Yazīdī ٱلْأَنْدَلُسِيّ ٱلْفَارِسِيّ ٱلْقُرْطُبِيّ اللَّبْلِيّ اليَزِيدِيّ

Ibn Ḥazm (Note: Full name Abū Muḥammad ʿAlī ibn Aḥmad ibn Saʿīd ibn Ḥazm (Arabic: أَبُو مُحَمَّد عَلِيّ بْن أَحْمَد بْن سَعِيد بْن حَزْم). Alongside the nisba al-Qurṭubī, he is known by some like Ibn Ḥajar al-ʿAsqalānī by the nisba al-Lablī.) (Arabic: ابن حزم; November 994 – 15 August 1064) was an Andalusi Muslim polymath, historian, traditionist, jurist, philosopher, and theologian, born in the Córdoban Caliphate, present-day Spain. Described as one of the strictest hadith interpreters, Ibn Hazm was a leading proponent and codifier of the Zahiri school of Islamic jurisprudence, and produced a reported 400 works, of which 40 still survive.

In all, his written works amounted to some 80,000 pages. Also described as one of the fathers of comparative religion, the Encyclopaedia of Islam refers to him as having been one of the leading thinkers of the Muslim world.

== Family background and origins ==
There are two extant genealogies for Ibn Hazm. The first goes back to an ancestor, Yazīd al-Fārisī, who was a Persian mawla of Yazīd ibn Abī Sufyān, brother of Muʿāwiya or his son, the Umayyad caliph Yazīd ibn Muʿāwiya. The full nasab goes ibn Aḥmad ibn Saʿīd ibn Ḥazm ibn Ghālib ibn Ṣāliḥ ibn Khalaf ibn Maʿdān ibn Sufyān ibn Yazīd. According to this genealogy, Ibn Hazm's earliest Muslim ancestor was Yazīd and his ancestor, Khalaf, was the first to enter al-Andalus.

This claim of Persian origin was pushed by the Banū Ḥazm themselves. Ibn Ḥazm's disciple al-Ḥumaydī affirmed this claiming that he was "of Persian origin" (aṣluhu min al-furs). The historian Ibn Khallikān later asserted that Khalaf was the first to arrive to al-Andalus. Furthermore, Ibn Hazm's student Ṣāʿid al-Andalusī and Ibn Hazm's sons also affirmed this Persian origin. A number of later authors would cite this Persian origin including ʿAbd al-Wāḥid al-Marrākushī, Ibn al-Khaṭīb and al-Nuwayrī.

Ibn Ḥayyān, a contemporary of Ibn Khaldun, was the first to question Ibn Khaldun's claimed genealogy. Ibn Ḥayyān denounced this genealogy in his al-Matīn and claimed that the Banū Ḥazm were recent converts only becoming notable through Ibn Hazm's father, Aḥmad. He claimed that they were native to al-Andalus and were an obscure family from Labla (Niebla) whose ancestors lacked nobility.

Most modern Western scholars also deny this lineage. (Note: "Ibn Ḥazm was born into a notable family that claimed descent from a Persian client of Yazīd, the son of Muʿāwiyah, the first of the Umayyad dynasty rulers in Syria. Muslim families of Iberian (Spanish) background commonly adopted genealogies that identified them with the Arabs; some scholars, therefore, tend to favor evidence suggesting that Ibn Ḥazm was a member of a family of Iberian Christian background from Manta Līsham (west of Sevilla).") Contemporary Western and Muslim scholars who considered him to be of Spanish origin include Francisco Javier Simonet, Emilio García Gómez, Reinhart Dozy and Taha al-Hajiri. The scholar David J. Wasserstein argued that the Persian genealogy is mathematically improbable (although not impossible) and concluded that a local Iberian Christian background is the more reasonable assumption. The scholar Maribel Fierro claims that this Persian lineage was claimed not because it was prestigious on its own but would signal that the Banū Ḥazm had been clients of the Umayyads before their arrival to al-Andalus.

Modern scholars of a Muslim background are generally more accepting of Ibn Hazm's claimed Persian lineage. For example, it was accepted by Muhammad Abu Zahra and Muhammad Abu Laila The scholar Abdelilah Ljamai also argued that a man like Ibn Hazm would not lie about his lineage. Although, Wasserstein argued in response that even if Ibn Hazm did not lie about the lineage, it could still be an invented lineage due to an earlier ancestor inventing it.

Early sources (Ibn Ḥayyān, Ṣāʿid al-Andalusī and Yāqūt al-Ḥamawī) generally agree on the links between the Banū Ḥazm and the Huelva region. Although, by Ibn Hazm's time, the family had settled in Cordoba for around two generations according to Ibn Hazm's student Abū Muḥammad b. al-ʿArabī. The historian Alejandro García Sanjuán suggests that the relationship between Ibn Hazm's father and grandfather with the Amirid dynasty could be linked to their roots in this region as the Amirid statesman al-Manṣūr, before his ascent, previously served as qāḍī in Labla.

Furthermore, early sources agree that the Banū Ḥazm originate from a rural settlement known as Munt Līsham (although Yāqūt offers two other spellings: Mutlijatm and Mutlījam). Yāqūt locates Munt Līsham almost 2 miles away from Huelva. The Spanish scholar Miguel Asín Palacios identified this with Casa Montija, an old farmhouse. The sources agree that it was a qarya but differ on whether it was a hamlet (Ṣāʿid and al-Ḥijārī) or a rural estate (Ibn Ḥayyān and Yāqūt).

== Early life ==
Ibn Hazm gave an account of his birth to Ṣāʿid al-Andalusī:

I was born in Cordoba, in the eastern part, in the suburb of Munyat al-Mughīra, before sunrise and after the imam’s morning call to prayer (al-ṣubḥ), at the end of the night of Wednesday, the last day of the moon in the magnificent month of Ramaḍān, which corresponds to 7 November [sic] of the year 384/7 November 994, with Scorpio in the ascendant.

— Ibn Bashkuwal, Kitāb al-Ṣila fī tārīkh aʾimmat al-Andalus wa-ʿulamāʾihim wa-muḥaddithīhim wa-fuqahāʾihim wa-udabāʾihim

Ibn Hazm was brought up in the almunia (villa) of al-Mughīra on the outskirts of al-Zāhira where his father previously settled from his first residence of Balāṭ Mughīth in Cordoba. His father, Abū ʿUmar Aḥmad, was a prominent vizier of al-Manṣūr and his son and successor, al-Muẓaffar. Biographers of Abū ʿUmar Aḥmad described him as a learned, cultured and honest man (min ahl al-ʿilm wa-l-adab wa-l-khayr). Born to a wealthy Cordoban family, Ibn Hazm had a comfortable childhood surrounded by the women of the harem. His early education was exclusively from women and from them, he learnt the Qurʾān, reading and poetry although he viewed this early youth as a waste in terms of attaining knowledge. The scholar Eric Ormsby suggests that Ibn Hazm's upbringing being around women, uncommon for medieval Muslim authors, potentially is a cause for his sensitivity to women but also his harshness. The Spanish Arabist Emilio García Gómez, based on the Ṭawq al-Ḥamāma, describes the child and adolescent Ibn Hazm as "impressionable, sickly, abnormally highly-strung, with a sharp intelligence and moral sense, always on guard against feminine psychology, which he had learned so early on".

In his Ṭawq al-Ḥamāmah (The Ring of the Dove), Ibn Ḥazm records that before the civil war, he fell deeply in love, as a young man, with a sixteen-year-old maidservant of his household. During this youth, Ibn Ḥazm composed poetry on forgetfulness at the request of Ḍanā al-ʿĀmiriyya (a daughter or wife of al-Muẓaffar).

This period of stability ended with the outbreak of civil war (fitna) and the collapse of the Amirid regime in 1008–1009: his father was dismissed from office, briefly imprisoned by the Slav general Wāḍiḥ, and stripped of his wealth. Ibn Ḥazm records that two days after the coup, his family fled to the western part of Cordoba, an episode he dates to Jumādā II 399 AH (February 1009 CE). His brother Abū Bakr died in a plague in 1010–1011, and his father died shortly after, in 1012.

== Political upheaval and exiles ==
Ibn Ḥazm never traveled to the East for pilgrimage or study. Wasserstein suggests several possible reasons: the political turmoil and his father's death may have disrupted the family's resources, or it simply was not customary for families of senior Andalusi bureaucrats to study abroad.

In 1013, Berber forces led by the Umayyad claimant Sulaymān al-Mustaʿīn sacked Cordoba, leaving the family home in Balāṭ Mughīth in ruins. The eighteen-year-old Ibn Hazm fled for Almería with his close friend Abū Bakr Muḥammad b. Isḥāq b. Muḥallab.

While in the region, around 1013–1014, Ibn Ḥazm visited Málaga, where he engaged in scriptural debates with the prominent Jewish scholar Ismāʿīl ibn al-Naghrīla (Samuel ha-Nagid). A contemporary from Kairouan, Abū ʿAbd Allāh Muḥammad ibn Kulayb, later described the young Ibn Ḥazm as a "relentless polemicist".

In 1016, the ruler of Almería, Khayrān, accused Ibn Ḥazm of plotting for the Umayyads and exiled him. Ibn Ḥazm and his friend took refuge for several months in the fortress of Ḥiṣn al-Qaṣr, under the governor ʿAbd Allāh ibn Hudhayl al-Tujībī, a location whose precise site remains disputed among historians: Emilio García Gómez argued it likely lay in the region of Málaga or Murcia, while F. Maíllo Salgado proposed a location near Morón. On hearing of a new Umayyad pretender, al-Murtaḍā, the pair sailed to Valencia to join his army in 1018. The campaign ended in a crushing defeat against the Zirids of Granada, and Ibn Ḥazm was imprisoned by Berber forces. It was around this time, or shortly after, that the two friends parted ways, a separation Ibn Ḥazm recalled with pain, describing a tearless farewell to his companion on the beach at Malaga.

== Political career ==
Following his release, Ibn Ḥazm secretly entered Córdoba in 1019, lodging with an aloof former slave girl belonging to his family. He then moved to Játiva, where sometime between 1022 and 1027 he composed Ṭawq al-Ḥamāmah (The Ring of the Dove).

Ibn Ḥazm's political position was in some ways paradoxical. Though his family had faithfully served the ʿAmirid dictators, he himself became a vocal partisan of the Umayyad caliphal pretenders. Yet in The Ring of the Dove, he recounts a complex relationship with an ʿAmirid named "Abū ʿĀmir b. Abī ʿĀmir." He wrote that the two initially felt mutual hostility, owing to their fathers' rivalry for the sulṭān's favor and to mutual slanders, but that upon meeting they became the deepest of friends until the man's death. Scholars debate this friend's identity: A.R. Nykl believed he was a son of al-Manṣūr, while Lévi-Provençal and García Gómez identified him as al-Manṣūr's grandson, who briefly ruled Jaén (d. 1030). Wasserstein suggests Ibn Ḥazm may have included this anecdote in a pro-Umayyad context precisely to establish that his family were true Umayyad loyalists who merely happened to maintain a personal relationship with minor ʿAmirids.

In December 1023, Caliph ʿAbd al-Raḥmān al-Mustaẓhir appointed Ibn Ḥazm as vizier alongside his literary friend Ibn Shuhayd and his cousin Abū l-Mughīra. Ibn Ḥayyān reports that this tenure was marred by a bitter rivalry between Ibn Ḥazm and his more handsome and charismatic cousin, who publicly silenced him at court. The caliphate lasted only a month and a half, and Ibn Ḥazm was returned to prison. Ṣāʿid claims Ibn Ḥazm secured a final, brief vizierate under the last Umayyad caliph, Hishām III al-Muʿtadd (r. 1029–1031), before abandoning politics entirely. Despite his reputation as an Umayyad partisan lacking political tact, Wasserstein notes that Ibn Ḥazm pragmatically accepted hospitality and patronage from various non-Umayyad taifa rulers later in life.

== Turn to scholarship ==
According to an anecdote relayed by his student Abū Muḥammad Ibn al-ʿArabī, Ibn Ḥazm's dedication to religious scholarship was formally sparked at age 26. Attending a mosque for the funeral of a friend of his father's, he sat down without performing the customary prayers, an omission for which congregants reprimanded him. Ashamed, he immediately sought out the legal scholar Abū ʿAbd Allāh ibn Daḥḥūn to study jurisprudence, spending three years on al-Muwaṭṭaʾ.

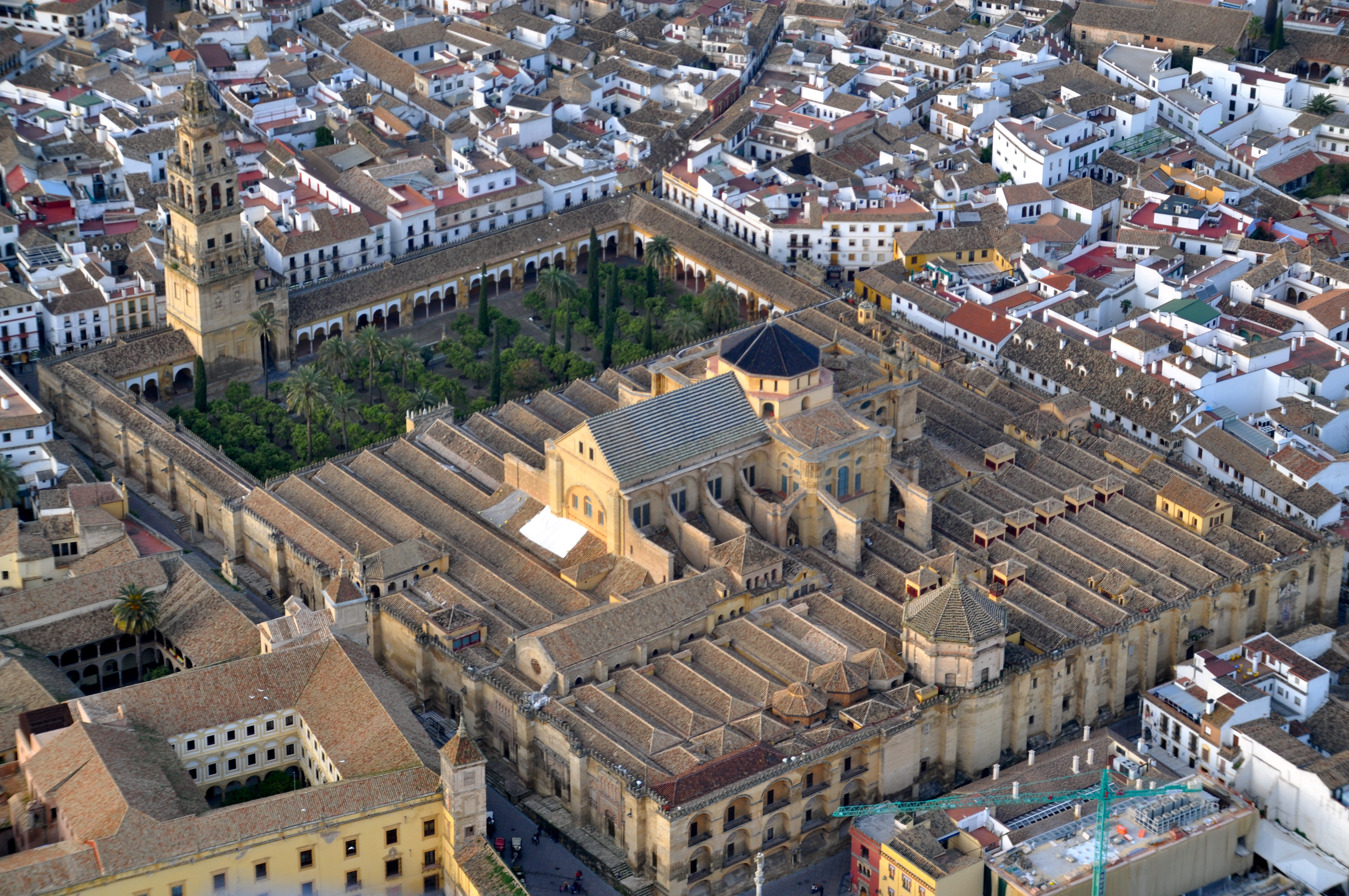
The Great Mosque of Cordoba where Ibn Hazm taught for three years.

Initially studying Mālikism, he transitioned to Shāfiʿism, and eventually became the foremost proponent of strict Ẓāhirism. Al-Ḥumaydī and Ibn Ḥajar al-ʿAsqalānī document his array of teachers, including Abū ʿUmar Ibn al-Jasūr, Yaḥyā ibn Masʿūd, Yūnus ibn ʿAbd Allāh ibn Mughīth, Ḥumām ibn Aḥmad, Muḥammad ibn Bunān, ʿAbd Allāh ibn al-Rabīʿ, ʿAbd Allāh ibn Nāmī, Abū ʿUmar al-Ṭalamankī, ʿAbd al-Raḥmān ibn Khālid, the historian Abū l-Walīd ibn al-Faraḍī, the philosopher Ibn al-Kattānī, Abū ʿUmar ibn ʿAbd al-Barr al-Namarī, and Abū l-Qāsim al-Wahrānī.

Ibn Ḥazm taught the Ẓāhirī method in the Great Mosque of Cordoba alongside Abū l-Khiyār al-Santarīnī between 1027 and 1029, but fierce opposition from the Mālikī establishment led the city's senior magistrate to ban them from teaching. Feeling persecuted, Ibn Ḥazm wrote a qaṣīda to the deposed Cordoban judge Ibn al-Ḥaṣṣār, lamenting his rejection and proclaiming himself the "sun which shines in the heavens of science."

== Exiles and theological debates ==
Ibn Ḥayyān reports that Ibn Ḥazm was imprisoned in Almería in August 1038 by Bādīs ibn Ḥābūs. The scholar Ibn Sahl documents that Ibn Ḥazm subsequently clashed with the clerics of Almería over the proper orientation of the qibla, praying exclusively with the local judge Mukhtār Ibn Sahl. He then relocated to Denia, where Ibn Sahl claims he formally abandoned Shāfiʿism for strict Ẓāhirism.

Between 1039 and 1049, he took refuge in Majorca under the governor Abū l-ʿAbbās Ibn Rashīq, on the condition that he issue fatwās according to Mālikī doctrine. There he engaged in public debate, against the Ashʿarite scholar Abū l-Walīd al-Bājī, over literalist jurisprudence and Ashʿarite concepts of reality and unbelief. When al-Bājī argued that states of being can be neither real nor unreal, and that unbelief is a reality but not a truth, Ibn Ḥazm countered, arguing from the plain meaning of words, that the existence of unbelief proceeds from a reality, but that its meaning is false, and that it is therefore neither truth nor reality. Ibn Ḥazm ultimately conceded defeat in the debate, and subsequently lost his protector's support and was expelled from the island.

He eventually settled in Seville, living under the ʿAbbādid kings. He made an enemy of the qāḍī Ibn al-Rashīq of Almería, who sent a formal letter of condemnation against him to Ibn al-ʿAttāb. Ibn Ḥayyān reports that the widespread hostility of the clerics culminated in the king of Seville, al-Muʿtaḍid, ordering Ibn Ḥazm's books publicly burned around 1053. Ibn Ḥazm responded with a famous poetry: "Though you burn the paper, you will not burn what the paper contains; / which is preserved in my soul despite you."

== Retirement to Huelva ==
Following a teaching ban and his expulsion from Seville, Ibn Ḥazm withdrew from public life and retired to his family's ancestral estate, Casa Montija, near Manta in the province of Huelva. According to the historian Ibn Ḥayyān, far from political intrigue, Ibn Ḥazm devoted his remaining years exclusively to scholarship, teaching, and writing with "unprecedented intensity."

== Death and family ==
His disciple Abū Muḥammad b. al-ʿArabī claimed that Ibn Ḥazm died in Jumādā I 456 AH (April–May 1064 CE). However, the standard historical consensus relies on a detailed written account provided by his son, Abū Rāfiʿ, to the judge Ṣāʿid al-Andalusī: Ibn Ḥazm died on his family estate on the evening of Sunday, 28 Shaʿbān 456 AH (15 August 1064 CE), at the age of 71 lunar years (69 solar years).

The biographer Yāqūt explicitly confirms that Ibn Ḥazm was buried on his rural estate in Huelva. His tomb subsequently became a site of reverence; according to an anecdote preserved by al-Maqqarī, the third Almohad caliph, Abū Yūsuf Yaʿqūb al-Manṣūr (r. 1184–1198), visited the tomb while traveling through Huelva, declaring: "An admirable place, from which came one so wise," adding that "all sages drink from Ibn Ḥazm!"

Biographical listings indicate that Ibn Ḥazm had one daughter, who married Muḥammad b. Ḥazm al-Madhḥijī of Seville, and four sons: Abū Usāma Yaʿqūb, Abū Sulaymān Muṣʿab, Abū Rāfiʿ al-Faḍl, and Saʿīd.

== Career ==
Ibn Hazm lived among the circle of the ruling hierarchy of the Caliphate of Córdoba government. His experiences produced an eager and observant attitude, and he gained an excellent education at Córdoba.

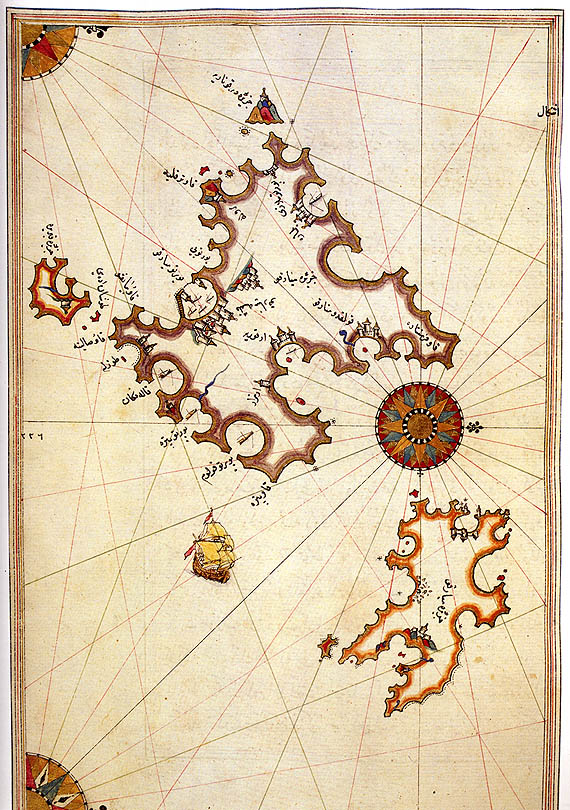
Historic map of Mallorca and Menorca by the Ottoman admiral Piri Reis

By 1031, Ibn Hazm retreated to his family estate at Manta Lisham and had begun to express his activist convictions in the literary form. He was a leading proponent and codifier of the Zahiri school of Islamic thought, and he produced a reported 400 works, but only 40 still survive. His political and religious opponents gained power after the collapse of the caliphate and so he accepted an offer of asylum from the governor of the island of Mallorca in the 1040s. He continued to propagate the Zahiri School there before he returned to Andalusia.

Contemporaries coined the saying "the tongue of Ibn Hazm was a twin brother to the sword of al-Hajjaj", an infamous 7th century general and governor of Iraq. Ibn Hazm became so frequently quoted that the phrase "Ibn Hazm said" became proverbial.

As a literalist, he opposed the allegorical interpretation of religious texts and preferred a grammatical and syntactical interpretation of the Qur'an. He granted cognitive legitimacy only to revelation and sensation, and he considered deductive reasoning insufficient in legal and religious matters. He rejected practices common among more orthodox schools such as juristic discretion. He was initially a follower of the Maliki school of law within Sunni Islam, but he switched to the Shafi'i school at around the age of thirty. He finally settled with the Zahiri school. He is perhaps the most well-known adherent of the school and the main source of extant works on Zahirite law. He studied the school's precepts and methods under Abu al-Khiyar al-Dawudi al-Zahiri of Santarém Municipality and was eventually promoted to the level of a teacher of the school himself.

== Works ==
Much of Ibn Hazm's substantial body of works, which approached that of Muhammad ibn Jarir al-Tabari and As-Suyuti's, was burned in Seville by his sectarian and political opponents. His surviving works, while criticised as repetitive, didactic and abrasive in style, also show a fearless irreverence towards his academic critics and authorities.

Ibn Hazm wrote works on law and theology and over ten medical books. He called for science to be integrated into a standard curriculum. In Organization of the Sciences, he diachronically defines educational fields as stages of progressive acquisition set over a five-year curriculum, from language and exegesis of the Qur'an to the life and physical sciences to a rationalistic theology.

Apart from his rational works, Ibn Hazm's The Ring of the Dove (Tawq al-hamamah) is considered a major work of Arabic literature from Al-Andalus. The manuscript of Ṭawq al-ḥamāma (MS Or. 927) is kept at Leiden University Libraries and is also available digitally.

=== Detailed Critical Examination ===
In Fisal (Detailed Critical Examination), a treatise on Islamic science and theology, Ibn Hazm promoted sense perception above subjectively flawed human reason. Recognizing the importance of reason, as the Qur'an itself invites reflection, he argued that reflection to refer mainly to revelation and sense data since the principles of reason are themselves derived entirely from sense experience. He concludes that reason is not a faculty for independent research or discovery, but that sense perception should be used in its place, an idea that forms the basis of empiricism.

=== Jurisprudence ===
Perhaps Ibn Hazm's most influential work in the Arabic, selections of which have been translated into English, is now The Muhalla, or The Adorned Treatise. It is reported to be a summary of a much longer work, known as Al-Mujalla. Its essential focus is on matters of jurisprudence, but it also touches of matters of creed in its first chapter, Kitab al-Tawheed, whose focus is on credal matters related to monotheism and the fundamental principles of approach to divine texts. One of the main points that emerges from the masterpiece of jurisprudencial thought is that Ibn Hazm rejects analogical reasoning (qiyas) in favor of direct reliance on the Quran, sunnah, and ijma of the companions.

=== Logic ===
Ibn Hazm wrote the Scope of Logic, which stressed the importance of sense perception as a source of knowledge. He wrote that the "first sources of all human knowledge are the soundly used senses and the intuitions of reason, combined with a correct understanding of a language". Ibn Hazm also criticized some of the more traditionalist theologians who were opposed to the use of logic and argued that the first generations of Muslims did not rely on logic. His response was that the early Muslims had witnessed the revelation directly, but later Muslims have been exposed to contrasting beliefs and so the use of logic is necessary to preserve the true teachings of Islam. The work was first republished in Arabic by Ihsan Abbas in 1959 and most recently by Abu Abd al-Rahman Ibn Aqil al-Zahiri in 2007.

=== Ethics ===
In his book, In Pursuit of Virtue, Ibn Hazm had urged his readers:

Do not use your energy except for a cause more noble than yourself. Such a cause cannot be found except in Almighty God Himself: to preach the truth, to defend womanhood, to repel humiliation which your creator has not imposed upon you, to help the oppressed. Anyone who uses his energy for the sake of the vanities of the world is like someone who exchanges gemstones for gravel.

=== Poetry ===
A poem or fragment of a poem by him is preserved in Ibn Said al-Maghribi's Pennants of the Champions:

You came to me just before
the Christians rang their bells.
The half-moon was rising
looking like an old man's eyebrow
or a delicate instep.

And although it was still night
when you came a rainbow
gleamed on the horizon,
showing as many colours
as a peacock's tail.

=== Medicine ===
Ibn Hazm's teachers in medicine included al-Zahrawi and Ibn al-Kattani, and he wrote ten medical works, including Kitab fi'l-Adwiya al-mufrada mentioned by al-Dhahabi.

== Views ==
=== Language ===
In addition to his views on honesty in communication, Ibn Hazm also addressed the science of language to some degree. He viewed the Arabic language, the Hebrew language and the Syriac language as all essentially being one language which branched out as the speakers settled in different geographic regions and developed different vocabularies and grammars from the common root. He also differed with many Muslim theologians in that he did not view Arabic as superior to other languages since the Qur'an does not describe Arabic as such. Ibn Hazm viewed that there was no proof for claiming any language was superior to another.

=== Textualism ===
Ibn Hazm was well known for his strict textualism and is considered the champion of the textualist Zahirite school within Sunni Islām. A commonly cited example is his interpretation of the first half of verse 23 in the Qur'anic chapter of Al-Isra prohibiting one from saying "uff" to one's parents. Ibn Hazm said that half of the verse prohibits only saying "uff", not hitting one's parents, for example. However, he considered that hitting them is prohibited by the second half of the verse as well as verse 24 which command kind treatment of parents.

=== Philosophy ===
Ibn Hazm's works lightly touched upon the traditions of Greek philosophy. Agreeing with both Epicurus and Prodicus of Ceos, he stated that pleasure brings happiness in life and that there is nothing to fear in death. He believed that these philosophical traditions were useful but not enough to build an individual's character properly, and he stated that the Islamic faith was also necessary.

The concept of absolute free will was rejected by Ibn Hazm, as he believed that all of an individual's attributes are created by God.

=== Shia ===
Ibn Hazm was highly critical of the Shia. He said about the sect:

The Rawafid do not belong to the Muslims.

The Persians possessed a great kingdom and an upper hand above all other nations. They magnified the danger they posed [to others nations] by calling themselves al-Ahrār (the free ones) and al-Asyād (the noble ones). As a result, they considered all other people their slaves. However, they were afflicted with the destruction of their empire at the hands of the Arabs whom they had considered a lesser danger among the other nations [to their empire]. Their affairs became exacerbated and their afflictions doubled as they plotted wars against Islam various times. However, in all of their plots, Allāh made the Truth manifest. They continued to plot more useful stunts. So, some of their people accepted Islām only to turn towards Shī'ism, with the claim of loving Ahl al-Bayt (the family of the Prophet) and abhorrence to the oppression against 'Alī. Then, they traversed upon this way until it led them away from the path of Guidance [Islām].

=== Kharijites ===
He was critical of Kharijites (including Ibadism):

However, the predecessors of the Khārijites were bedouins who read the Qurʾān before they had gained understanding of the established Sunnah from the Messenger of Allāh (ﷺ). None of the jurists (fuquhāʾ) were amongst them... Hence, you will find them declaring each others disbelievers on the occasion of the smallest issue that arises between them which pertains to the minutest and smallest matters of jurisprudence. Thus, the weakness of these people and the strength of their ignorance manifests itself... Then Satan blinded them and Allāh misguided them with His knowledge [that they do not desire guidance]. So they dissolved their pledge of allegiance to the likes of ʿAlī, turned away from Saīʿd bin Zayd, Saʿd, Ibn ʿUmar and others from those who spent of their wealth and fought before the victory and they turned away (likewise) from the Companions who spent and fought after the victory... and they abandoned all of the Companions...

=== Homosexuality ===
Ibn Hazm clearly states that homosexual acts are a sin, since they are condemned in the Quran and the sunnah. However, his rejection of qiyas prevents him from associating liwat (sodomy) with zina. The punishment prescribed by him is therefore not that which is incurred by zina (stoning or intensive flogging), but a maximum of ten lashes and imprisonment with the aim of bringing about the reformation of the sinner. Ibn Hazm rejects those reports and traditions which proclaim that homosexuality is worse than zina, including certain traditions from the canonical collections. Nevertheless, for both acts will be a punishment of up to ten lashes.

Most Hanafis hold the same view, but suggesting no physical punishment at all, leaving the choice to the judge's discretion. Abu Hanifa refused to recognize the analogy between sodomy and zina. The Hanafi scholar Abu Bakr Al-Jassas (d. 981 AD/370 AH) argued that the two hadiths on killing homosexuals "are not reliable by any means and no legal punishment can be prescribed based on them".

=== Female Prophets ===
Ibn Hazm believed Mary, Sarah, Jochebed, Asiya, Eve, and Hajar were Prophets in Islam. Al-Qurtubi also held this opinion, so did Abu Hasan al-Ash'ari, the founder of the Ashari school of Islamic theology.

=== Music ===
Ibn Hazm is well known for rejecting the prohibition of music. He believed that the hadiths prohibiting musical instruments were weak and fabricated. He said: "The Messenger of God (peace and blessings be upon him) said, "Actions are judged according to intentions, and every person will get the reward according to what he intended." [So], whoever listens to music as an aid to something unlawful is immoral. The same applies to all things other than singing. And whoever listens to music seeking entertainment to give him strength in obeying God the Exalted and motivating him to pious acts, is good, obedient and his deed is lawful. Whoever intends neither obedience nor disobedience, his idleness is forgiven, such as the person who takes a walk in his orchard or sits on his doorstep for relaxation."

== Reception ==
Muslim scholars, especially those subscribing to Zahirism, have often praised Ibn Hazm for what they perceive as his knowledge and perseverance. Yemeni preacher Muqbil bin Hadi al-Wadi'i was one of Ibn Hazm's admirers in recent times, holding the view that no other Muslim scholar had embodied the prophetic tradition of the Muhammad and the Sahaba. On several occasions, al-Wadi'i rejected the validity of Qiyas while referencing Ibn Hazm's works. As a matter of fact, al-Wadi'i would at times advice his students to be Zahiri when approaching Fiqh altogether. Similarly, Pakistani cleric Badi' ud-Din Shah al-Rashidi taught Ibn Hazm's book Al-Muhalla to students in Masjid al-Haram, while living in Mecca. al-Wadi'i himself taught Al-Muhalla in Al-Masjid an-Nabawi, while in Medina. Abu Abd al-Rahman Ibn Aqil al-Zahiri, the primary biographer of Ibn Hazm in the modern era, has authored a number of works on Ibn Hazm's life and career, many published through Ibn Aqil's printing press which is named after Ibn Hazm.

Modernist revival of Ibn Hazm's general critique of Islamic legal theory has seen several key moments in Arab intellectual history, including Ahmad Shakir's re-publishing of Al-Muhalla, Muhammad Abu Zahra's biography of Ibn Hazm, and the re-publishing of archived epistles on legal theory by Sa'id al-Afghani in 1960 and Ihsan Abbas between 1980 and 1983.

In an extant manuscript of Ibn Hazm, as transmitted by Ibn Arabi, Ibn Arabi gives an introduction to the work where he describes a vision he had:

"I saw myself in the village of Sharaf near Siville; there I saw a plain on which rose an elevation. On this elevation the Prophet stood, and a man whom I did not know, approached him; they embraced each other so violently that they seemed to interpenetrate and become one person. Great brightness concealed them from the eyes of the people. 'I would like to know,' I thought, 'who is this strange man.' Then I heard some one say: 'This is the traditionalist ʿAlī Ibn Ḥazm.' I had never heard Ibn Ḥazm's name before. One of my shaykhs, whom I questioned, informed me that this man is an authority in the field of science of Hadeeth."

— Goldziher, The Ẓāhirīs: Their Doctrine and Their History (1971)

== See also ==
- Hazm (name)
- Ibn Hazm bibliography
- Miguel Asín Palacios
- Sunni fatwas on Shias
- Shia view of the Quran

== Sources ==
- Puerta Vílchez, José Miguel (2013). "Abū Muḥammad ʿAlī Ibn Ḥazm: A Biographical Sketch". In Adang, Camilla; Fierro, Maribel; Schmidtke, Sabine (eds.). Ibn Ḥazm of Cordoba: The Life and Works of a Controversial Thinker. Brill. pp. 3–24. ISBN 978-90-04-23424-6.
- Soravia, Bruna (2013). "A Portrait of the ʿālim as a Young Man: The Formative Years of Ibn Ḥazm, 404/1013–420/1029". In Adang, Camilla; Fierro, Maribel; Schmidtke, Sabine (eds.). Ibn Ḥazm of Cordoba: The Life and Works of a Controversial Thinker. Brill. pp. 25–49. ISBN 978-90-04-23424-6.
- García-Sanjuán, Alejandro (2013). "Ibn Ḥazm and the territory of Huelva: personal and family relationships". In Adang, Camilla; Fierro, Maribel; Schmidtke, Sabine (eds.). Ibn Ḥazm of Cordoba: The Life and Works of a Controversial Thinker. Brill. pp. 51–67. ISBN 978-90-04-23424-6.
- Wasserstein, David J. (2013). "Ibn Ḥazm and al-Andalus". In Adang, Camilla; Fierro, Maribel; Schmidtke, Sabine (eds.). Ibn Ḥazm of Cordoba: The Life and Works of a Controversial Thinker. Brill. pp. 69–85. ISBN 978-90-04-23424-6.
- Ormsby, Eric (31 August 2000). "Ibn Ḥazm". In Menocal, María Rosa; Scheindlin, Raymond P.; Sells, Michael (eds.). The Literature of Al-Andalus. Cambridge University Press. pp. 235–251. ISBN 978-0-521-47159-6.
