= Bratla =

Bratla is a village in Kotli district, Azad Kashmir, Pakistan. It is located at a high point on a steep plateau. The name derives from the Pahari word Barra-tilla, meaning "high (or big) mount".

Bratla is divided into several muhallas, including Potha, Seher, Parat, Garaan, Lassa, Sagyam, Parkass, Jandi na Tarappa, kund tanderi, Baghaan, Sehensa and Narali. It has waterfalls from the River Mhool, which runs through nearby Koi village. The Historic Battle of Dabraian took near this village.

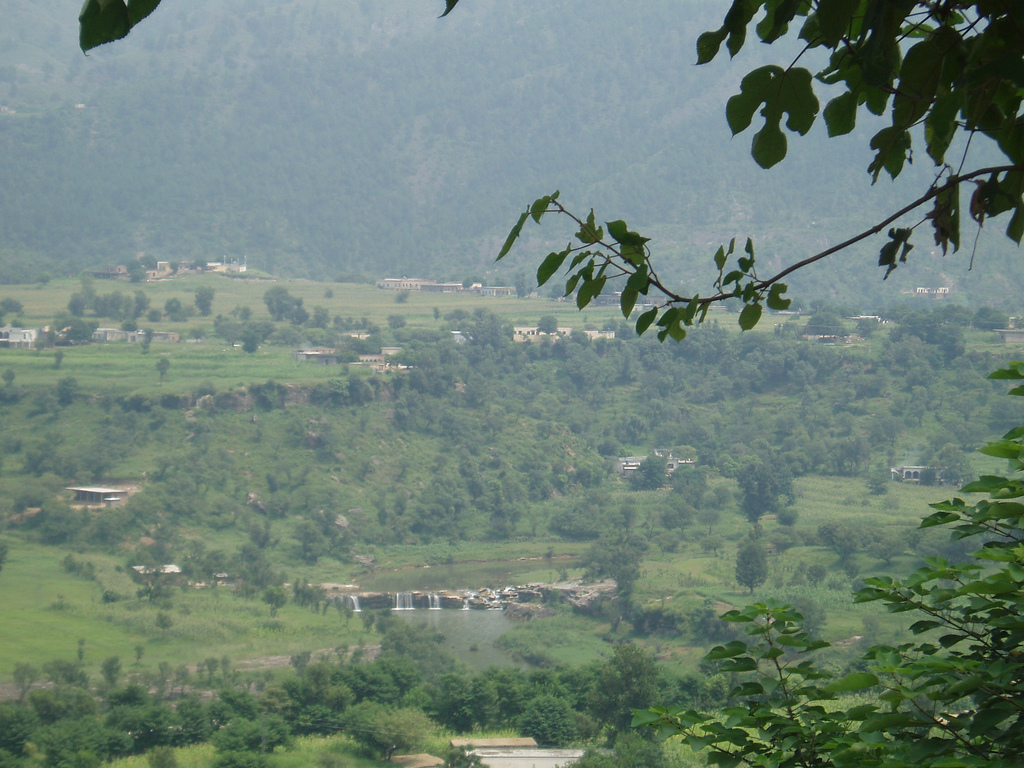
Location close to where the famous battle of Dabrian took place.
