= Al-Azdi al-Humaydi =

Islamic Scholar, theologian and jurist

Al-Humaydi

Personal life
- Born: Muhammad al-Azdi; 1029 /420 AH Majorca, Taifa of Dénia
- Died: 1095 /488 AH Baghdad, Abbasid Caliphate
- Era: Islamic Golden Age
- Region: Middle East
- Main interest(s): Islamic Theology, Islamic Jurisprudence and Sunnah
- Occupation: Islamic Scholar, Theologian and Jurist

Religious life
- Religion: Islam
- Denomination: Sunni
- Jurisprudence: Zahiri

Muslim leader
- Influenced by: Ibn Hazm, Ibn 'Abd al-Barr
- Arabic name
- Personal (Ism): Muḥammad
- Patronymic (Nasab): ibn Abī Naṣr al-Fattūḥ bin Abd Allah bin Futtuh bin Humayd bin Yasil al-Azdi
- Teknonymic (Kunya): Abu Abd Allah
- Toponymic (Nisba): Al-Humaydi; Al-Andalusi

Abu Abd Allah Muhammad ibn Abi Nasr Futuh ibn Abd Allah ibn Futuh ibn Humayd ibn Yasil (1029–1095), most commonly known as al-Humaydi, was an Andalusian scholar of history and Islamic studies of Arab origin.

== Life ==
Humaydi's family belonged to the Arab Azd tribe from Yemen. According to the Encyclopedia of Islam, his father was born in al-Rusafa, a suburb of Córdoba. Due to civil strife at the time, Humaydi's father moved to the island of Majorca, where Humaydi was born in c. 1029AD.

While in Spain, Humaydi was a student of Ibn 'Abd al-Barr and both a student and friend of Ibn Hazm, from whom Humaydi took his Zahirite views in Muslim jurisprudence. Due to persecution of Zahirites in Al-Andalus by the rival Malikites at the time, Humaydi fled from Spain for good in 1056. Initially, he went to Mecca and performed the Muslim pilgrimage before traveling to Tunisia, Egypt and Damascus to pursue Hadith studies. Like many scholars of that field, Humaydi frequently worked with manuscripts written in different eras and was thus an outstanding scholar in the fields of history, Arabic grammar and lexicography as well.

Eventually, Humaydi settled down in Baghdad, where the Zahirite rite had once been the official law of the land. While not enjoying state sponsorship, his views did receive tolerance as opposed to the outright persecution from which Humaydi had escaped. He died in the city in 1095.

== Works ==
Humaydi was famous for his biography of the notables of Islamic Spain, entitled Jadhwat al-muqtabis fī tārīkh ʻulamāʼ al-Andalus (جذوة المقتبس فى ذكر ولاة الاندلس ) OCLC 13643176. He composed the book while in Baghdad on request of his friends, writing entirely from memory without any other written sources. The book is considered the earliest primary source to mention Abu al-Qasim al-Zahrawi, and an important primary source for the life of Ziryab.

Humaydi's historical works are one of the main Arabic primary sources on the Pisan–Genoese expeditions to Sardinia in the early 11th century, largely considered precursors to the Crusades.

In the field of hadith, Humaydi is credited with inventing the genre of combining multiple independent books of hadith into bound collections, a style of cataloging which would gain even more popularity in the 12th century. His books on hadith are also considered significant to modern attempts at critical reevaluations, especially al-Jamʻ bayna al-Ṣaḥīḥayn (الجمع بين الصحيحين) OCLC 41454057 his combination between the two most important canonical works, Sahih al-Bukhari and Sahih Muslim.

=== Edited works ===
- al-Dhahab al-masbuk fi wa'z al-muluk. Eds. Abu Abd al-Rahman Ibn Aqil al-Zahiri and Dr. Abd al-Halim Uways. Riyadh: Dar Alam al-Kutub, 1982. 235 pages. Kings and rulers.
- El Tafsir al-gharib ma fi al-Sahihayn de el Humaydi. Ed. Z.M.S. 'Abd al-'Aziz (PhD dissertation). Complutense University of Madrid, 1989. Based on a 1995 reprint of Humaydi's original from Maktabat al-Sunna in Cairo.
