= Ahmad Muhammad Shakir =

Egyptian scholar and Sharia judge (1892–1958)

Aḥmad Muḥammad Shākir

Personal life
- Born: January 29, 1892
- Died: June 14, 1958 (aged 66)
- Region: Cairo, Egypt
- Main interest: Hadith

Religious life
- Religion: Islam
- Denomination: Sunni
- Jurisprudence: Hanafi
- Creed: Athari

Muslim leader
- Influenced by: Muhammad Rashid Rida
- Influenced: Abu Turab al-Zahiri

Ahmad Muhammad Shakir (Arabic: أحمد محمد شاكر, romanized: Aḥmad Muḥammad Shākir) (January 29, 1892, Cairo – June 14, 1958) was an Egyptian Islamic scholar of hadith. He is the son of Muḥammad Shākir ibn Aḥmad, an Islamic scholar of Al-Azhar University and elder brother of Mahmud Muhammad Shakir, a writer and journalist.

As editor, Shākir's Cairo publication, from 1937 in 5 volumes, provided the standard topical classification of the hadith Arabic text for Sunan at-Tirmidhi. The work was subject to many reprints.

== Career ==
He graduated from and worked at Al-Azhar University and retired in 1951. Among the positions that he held was that of vice-chairman of the Supreme Shariah Court in Cairo.

== Works ==
- al-Ba'ith al-Hathith: his explanation of Ibn Kathir's Ikhtisaar 'Uloom al-Hadith, an abridgement of the Muqaddimah in hadith terminology
- Musnad Ahmad ibn Hanbal: his footnotes to approximately the first third of Ahmad ibn Hanbal's large collection of hadith
- Jaami' al-Bayyaan, commonly referred to as Tafsir al-Tabari: footnotes to Muhammad ibn Jarir al-Tabari's explanation of the Quran; incomplete
- Sunan al-Tirmidhi: his footnotes to about the first third of this hadith collection
- al-Muhalla: footnotes to the fiqh book of ibn Hazm
- al-'Aqidah al-Tahaawiyyah: editing and footnotes to the famous book of Sunni creed by Ahmad ibn Muhammad al-Tahawi
- 'Umdah al-Tafsir: abridgement of Tafsir ibn Kathir; incomplete
