= Butt Road Jumma Masjid =

Mosque in Parangimalai, Tamil Nadu, India

- Location of the mosque in Chennai

Religion
- Affiliation: Islam
- Ecclesiastical or organizational status: Friday mosque
- Leadership: Moulana Moulavi Muhammed Zakaria Kasibi (imam)
- Status: Active

Location
- Location: Parangimalai, Greater Chennai, Tamil Nadu
- Country: India
- Interactive map of Butt Road Jumma Masjid
- Coordinates: 13°00′33″N 80°11′37″E

Architecture
- Type: Mosque architecture
- Founder: Janab Shaikh Dawood
- Completed: 1889 (1st structure); 1984 (current structure)

Specifications
- Dome: One (maybe more)
- Minaret: One (maybe more)

Website
- buttroadmasjid.org

The Butt Road Jumma Masjid is a Friday mosque located in Parangimalai on the outskirts of Chennai, in the state of Tamil Nadu, India. Situated 13 kilometres (8.1 mi) from Chennai city and 2 kilometres (1.2 mi) from Guindy on the Mount-Poonamallee Road, the mosque caters to the Muslim population of the suburb and the nearby cantonment.

== History ==
The Jama Masjid was constructed on 11 November 1889 by a Muslim community leader Janab Shaikh Dawood and his brothers. The mosque became property of the Wakf Board in 1905. The old mosque was demolished and a new mosque built in its place in 1984. The mosque was expanded, with a new look, as well as more space was created for worshipers during Eid times and Friday prayers.

Many people working in the nearby IT parks and companies flew to the Butt Road Masjid to offer prayers along with local Muhallas. Muslim women are permitted to attend "Eid Namazs" inside the mosque; one of the few mosques to do so. Female worshipers are offered a separate place to offer namaz and hear bions.

Apart from worship activities, the mosque community offers "Dawah Programs for non Muslims", Nikah Arrangements, their own kabarastan to leading janaza namaz. The imam is Moulana Moulavi Muhammed Zakaria Kasibi.

== See also ==
- Islam in India
- List of mosques in India
