= Classical Arabic =

Form of the Arabic language

- Quranic Arabic
- العربية الفصحى al-ʻArabīyah al-Fuṣḥā
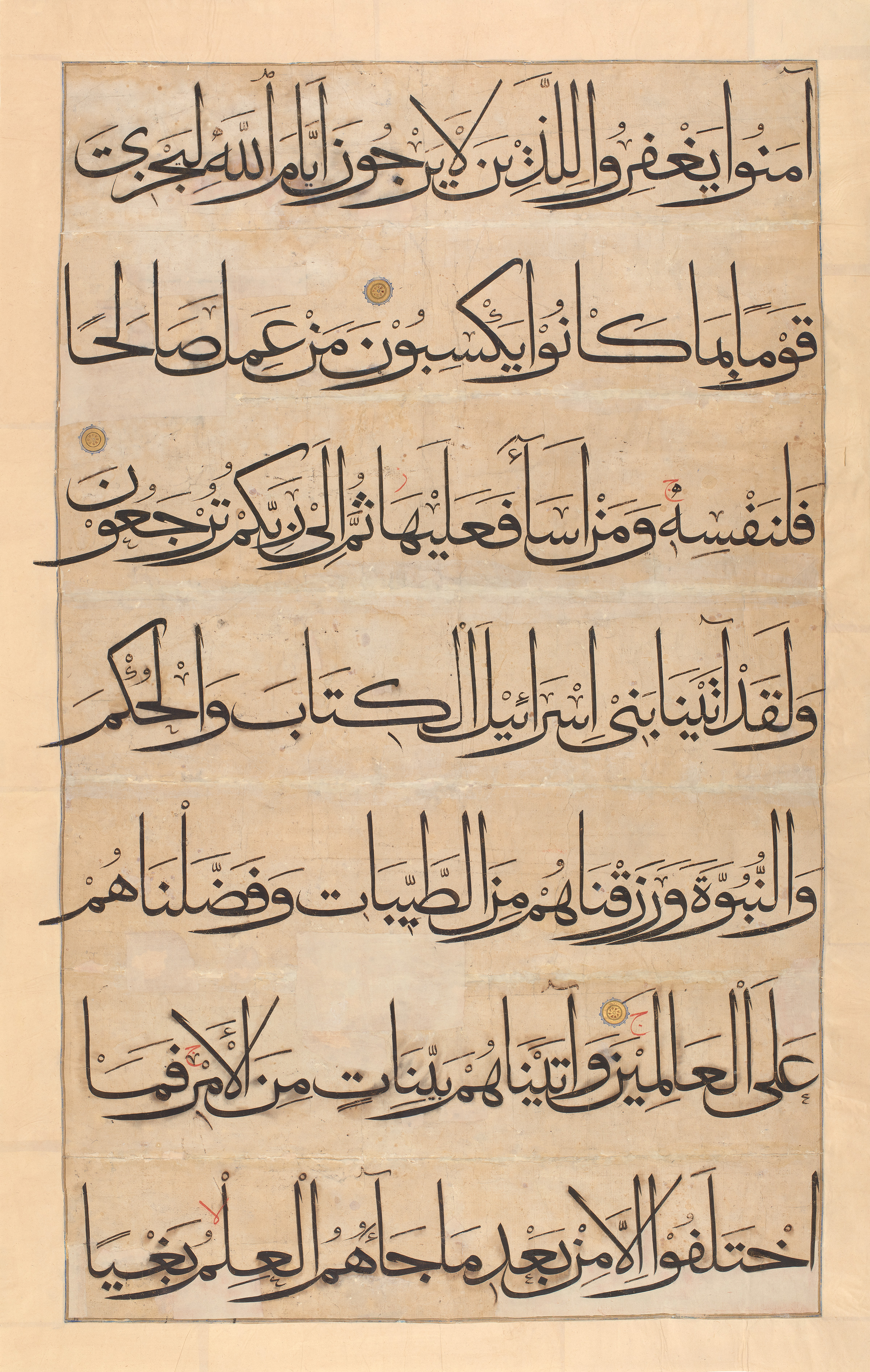
- Verses from the Quran vocalized in a reading tradition considered normative Classical Arabic, written in the cursive Arabic.
- Pronunciation: /al ʕaraˈbijja lˈfusˤħaː/
- Native to: Early Islamic Caliphates
- Region: Muslim World
- Ethnicity: Arabs
- Era: 7th–9th centuries AD; Continued as a liturgical language of Islam; Spoken with a modernized pronunciation
- Language family: Afro-Asiatic: Semitic; West Semitic; Central Semitic; Arabic; Classical Arabic
- Early form: Old Arabic
- Writing system: Arabic abjad

Language codes
- ISO 639-3: –
- Glottolog: None

Classical Arabic or Quranic Arabic (Arabic: العربية الفصحى, romanized: al-ʻArabīyah al-Fuṣḥā, lit. 'the most eloquent Arabic') is the standardized literary form of Arabic used from the 7th century and throughout the Middle Ages, most notably in Umayyad and Abbasid literary texts such as poetry, elevated prose and oratory, and is also the liturgical language of Islam, "Quranic" referring to the Quran. Classical Arabic is, furthermore, the register of the Arabic language on which Modern Standard Arabic is based.

Several written grammars of Classical Arabic were published with the exegesis of Arabic grammar being at times based on the existing texts and the works of previous texts, in addition to various early sources considered to be of most venerated genesis of Arabic. The primary focus of such works was to facilitate different linguistic aspects.

Modern Standard Arabic is its direct descendant used today throughout the Arab world in both writing and formal speaking, for example prepared speeches, some radio and television broadcasts and non-entertainment content. The lexis and stylistics of Modern Standard Arabic are different from Classical Arabic, and Modern Standard Arabic uses a subset of the syntactic structures available in Classical Arabic, but the morphology and syntax have remained basically unchanged. In the Arab world little distinction is made between Classical Arabic and Modern Standard Arabic and both are normally called al-fuṣḥā (الفصحى) in Arabic, meaning 'the most eloquent'.

Classical Arabic is considered a conservative language among Semitic languages; it preserved the complete Proto-Semitic three grammatical cases and declension (ʾIʿrab), and it was used in the reconstruction of Proto-Semitic since it preserves as contrastive 28 out of the evident 29 consonantal phonemes.

== History ==
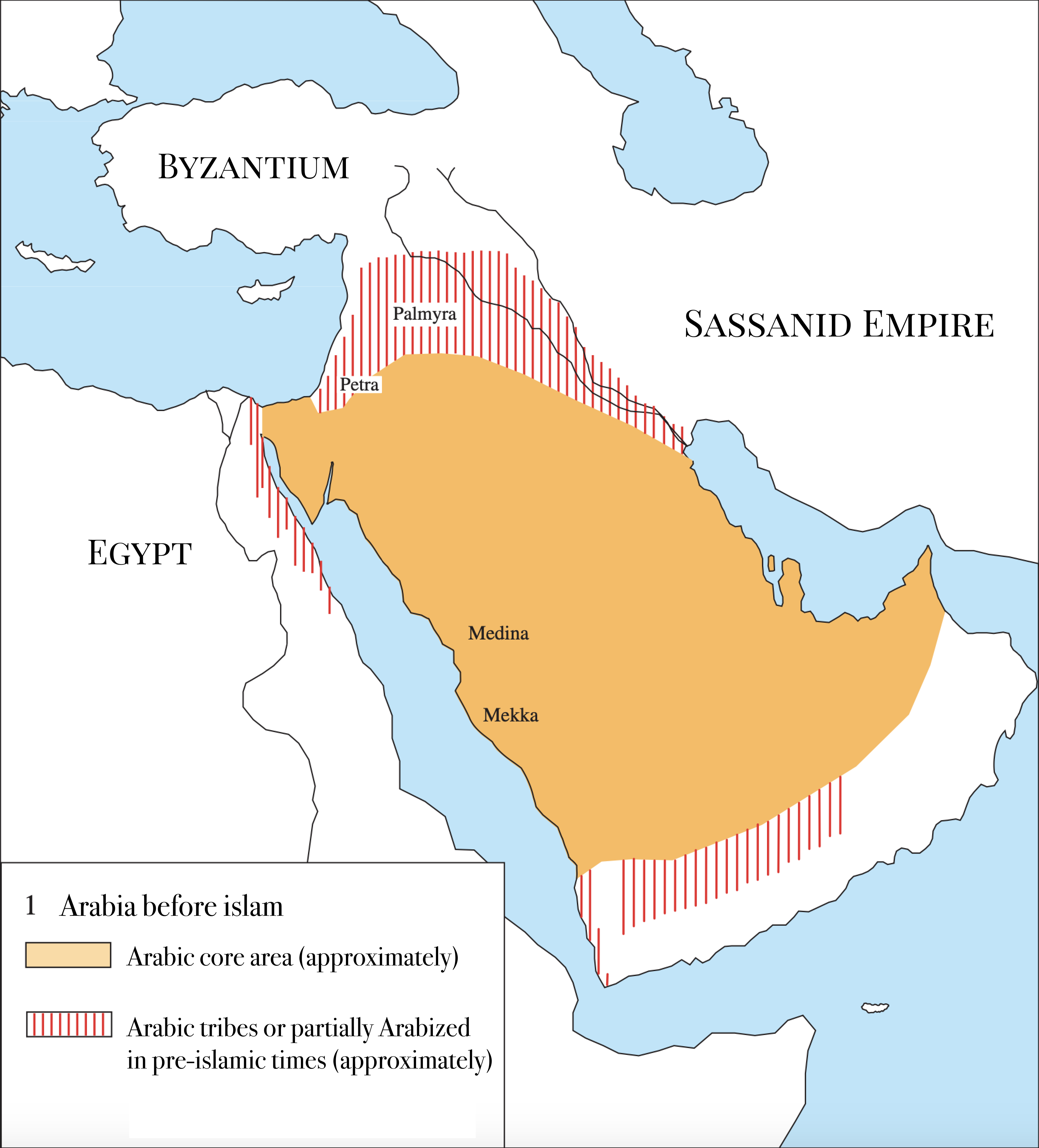
Distribution of Arabic dialects before the Rashidun Islamic conquests.

The earliest forms of Arabic are known as Old Arabic and survive in inscriptions in Ancient North Arabian scripts as well as fragments of pre-Islamic poetry preserved in the classical literature. It is hypothesized that by the late 6th century AD a relatively uniform intertribal "poetic koiné", a synthetic language distinct from the spoken vernaculars, had developed with conservative as well as innovative features, including the case endings known as ʾiʿrab. It is uncertain to what degree the spoken vernaculars corresponded to the literary style, however, as many surviving inscriptions in the region seem to indicate simplification or absence of the inflectional morphology of Classical Arabic. It is often said that the Bedouin dialects of Najd were probably the most conservative (or at least resembled the elevated intertribal idiom morphologically and lexically more than the other contemporary vernaculars), a view possibly supported by the romanticization of the ‘purity’ of the language of the desert-dwellers (as opposed to the "corrupted" dialects of the city-dwellers) expressed in many medieval Arabic works, especially those on grammar, though some argue that all the spoken vernaculars probably deviated greatly from the supraregional literary norm to different degrees, while others, such as Joshua Blau, believe that "the differences between the classical and spoken language were not too far-reaching".

The Arabic script is generally believed to have evolved from local cursive varieties of the Aramaic script, which have been adopted to write Arabic, though some, such as Jean Starcky, have postulated that it instead derives direct from the Syriac script since, unlike Aramaic, the scripts of Arabic and Syriac are both cursive. Indigenous speculations concerning the history of the script sometimes ascribe the origins of the script, and oftentimes the language itself also, to one of the ancient major figures in Islam, such as Adam or Ishmael, though others mention that it was introduced to Arabia from afar. In the 7th century AD the distinctive features of Old Hijazi, such as loss of final short vowels, loss of hamza, lenition of final /-at/ to /-ah/ and lack of nunation, influenced the consonantal text (or rasm) of the Qur'an (and also many of its readings also) and the later normalized orthography of Classical Arabic as a standard literary register in the 8th century.

By the 2nd century AH (9th century AD) the language had been standardized by Arabic grammarians and knowledge of Classical Arabic became a prerequisite for rising into the higher classes throughout the Islamic world, since it was the lingua franca across the Middle East, North Africa, and the Horn of Africa, and thus the region eventually developed into a widespread state of diglossia. Consequently the classical language, as well as the Arabic script, became the subject of much mythicization and was eventually associated with religious, ethnic, and racial conflicts, such as the rise of many groups traditionally categorized under the broad label of al-Shu'ibiyya (roughly meaning "those of the nations", as opposed to Arab tribes), who, despite the remarkable differences in their views, generally rejected the stressed and often dogmatized belief that the Arabs, as well as their language, were far superior to all other races and ethnicities, (Note: Such views were not held only by Arabs. Many Islamized Persians appear to have internalized similar beliefs, and they are expressed in the works of such renowned Persian scholars as al-Farisi and his pupil Ibn Jinni.) and so the term later came to be applied pejoratively to such groups by their rivals. (Note: The term is used disparagingly in the introduction to Al-Mufaṣṣal, a treatise on Arabic grammar by the Persian theologian and exegete al-Zamakhshari, wherein he begins by attacking "al-Shu'ubiyya" and thanking Allah for making him "a faithful ally of the Arabs". However the term was also used positively as it derives from the Qur'an.) Moreover, many Arabic grammarians strove to attribute as many words as possible to a "pure Arabic origin", especially those in the Qur'an. Thus, exegetes, theologians, and grammarians who entertained the idea of the presence of "impurities" (for example, naturalized loanwords) in the Qur'an were severely criticized and their proposed etymologies denounced in most cases. (Note: Versteegh (1997) believes that early Medieval Arabic etymologists and philologists, be they exegetes, grammarians, or both, were noticeably far more eager to ascribe words to historically non-Arabic origins, and so he concludes that the spread of the association of "linguistic supremacy" with "etymological purity" was a later development, though he mentions al-Suyuti as a notable exception to this puristic attitude, which eventually became prevalent.) Nonetheless, the belief in the racial and ethnic supremacy of the Arabs and the belief in the linguistic supremacy of Arabic did not seem to be necessary entailments of each other. (Note: Abu 'Ubayda, a Persian philologist, exegete, and historian who was later accused of "hating Arabs", asserted that "the Qur'an was revealed in a clear Arabic tongue, and so whosoever claims that [the word] "taha" is Nabatean has committed a great error".)

Poems and sayings attributed to Arabic-speaking personages who lived before the standardization of the Classical idiom, which are preserved mainly in far later manuscripts, contain traces of elements in morphology and syntax that began to be regarded as chiefly poetic or characteristically regional or dialectal. Despite this, these, along with the Qur'an, were perceived as the principal foundation upon which grammatical inquiry, theorizing, and reasoning were to be based. They also formed the literary ideal to be followed, quoted, and imitated in solemn texts and speeches. Lexically, Classical Arabic may retain one or more of the dialectal forms of a given word as variants of the standardized forms, albeit often with much less currency and use.

Various Arabic dialects freely borrowed words from Classical Arabic, a situation similar to the Romance languages, wherein scores of words were borrowed directly from Classical Latin. Arabic-speakers usually spoke Classical Arabic as a second language (if they spoke the colloquial dialects as their first language) or as a third language (if they spoke another language as their first language and a regional variety of colloquial Arabic as their second language). Nonetheless, the pronunciation of Classical Arabic was likely influenced by the vernaculars to different degrees (much like Modern Standard Arabic). The differences in pronunciation and vocabulary in the regional Arabic varieties were in turn variously influenced by the native languages spoken in the conquered regions, such as Coptic in Egypt; Berber and Punic in the Maghreb; Himyaritic, Modern South Arabian, and Old South Arabian in Yemen; and Aramaic in the Levant.

== Phonology ==
=== Consonants ===
Like Modern Standard Arabic, Classical Arabic had 28 consonant phonemes:

Classical Arabic consonant phonemes
		Labial	Dental	Alveolar		Palatal	Velar	Uvular	Pharyngeal	Glottal
		Labial	Dental	plain	emphatic	Palatal	Velar	Uvular	Pharyngeal	Glottal
Nasal		m م		n ن						
Plosive	voiceless^{8}			t ت	tˁ^{1} ط		k ك	q^{2} ق		ʔ ء
Plosive	voiced	b ب		d د	ɮˁ^{5} ~ dˤ ض	ɟ^{3} ج				
Fricative	voiceless	f ف	θ ث	s س	sˁ ص	ʃ ش		χ خ	ħ ح	h ه
Fricative	voiced		ð ذ	z ز	ðˁ ظ			ʁ غ	ʕ ع	
Trill / Tap				r^{7} ر						
Approximant				l ل	(lˁ)^{^{6}} ل	j ي	w و			

Notes:

^1Sibawayh described the consonant ⟨ط⟩ as voiced (/dˁ/), but some modern linguists cast doubt upon this testimony. It is likely that the word used to describe it did not mean voiced but rather unaspirated.
^2The 14th century historian Ibn Khaldun described the pronunciation of ⟨ق⟩ as a voiced velar /ɡ/ and that it might have been the old Arabic pronunciation of the letter; he even describes that the prophet Muhammad may have used the /ɡ/ pronunciation.
^3As it derives from Proto-Semitic *g, /ɟ/ may have been a palatalized velar: /ɡʲ/.
^5This is retrospectively reconstructed based on ancient texts describing the proper pronunciation and discouraging the use of any other pronunciation.
^6/lˁ/ is a marginal phoneme that only appears in /(ʔa)lːˁɑːh/, the name of God, Allah, except after /i/ or /iː/ when it becomes unemphatic /l/: bismi l–lāhi /bismi‿lːaːhi/ ('in the name of God')
^7/rˁ/ is emphatic except before /i/, /iː/ and /j/ when it becomes unemphatic [r].
^8/t/ and /k/ are aspirated [tʰ] and [kʰ], whereas /tˤ/ and /q/ are unaspirated.

=== Vowels ===
Monophthong phonemes
	Short		Long	
	Front	Back	Front	Back
Close	i	u	iː	uː
Mid			(eː)	
Open	a		aː	

Notes:
- [ɑ(ː)] is the allophone of /a/ and /aː/ after uvular and emphatic consonants
- [eː] arose from two separate sources, often conflated:
  - The contraction of the triphthong *ayV. Some Arabs said banē (< *banaya) for banā ("he built") and zēda (< *zayida) for zāda ("it increased"). This /eː/ merged with /aː/ in later Classical Arabic and most modern Arabic dialects.
  - A completely different phenomenon called imāla led to the raising of /a/ and /aː/ adjacent to a sequence i(ː)C or Ci(ː), where C was a non-emphatic, non-uvular consonant, e.g. al-kēfirīna < al-kāfirīna ("the infidels"). Imala could also occur in the absence of an i-vowel in an adjacent syllable. It was considered acceptable Classical Arabic by Sibawayh, and still occurs in numerous modern Arabic dialects, particularly the urban dialects of the Fertile Crescent and the Mediterranean.
- [eː] may have been the original pronunciation of a final ی which is otherwise pronounced as [aː]. In the Kisā'i and Hamzah recitations of the Qur'an, this pronunciation is used, whereas in the Hafs pronunciation aː is used instead. An example of this can be seen in the names Mūsā (Moses), 'īsā (Jesus), and Yahyā (John), which would be pronounced as Musē, 'īsē and Yahyē in the former two manners of recitation.

== Grammar ==
=== Nouns ===
==== Case ====
The A1 inscription dated to the 3rd or 4th century AD in the Greek alphabet in a dialect showing affinities to that of the Safaitic inscriptions shows that short final high vowels had been lost in at least some dialects of Old Arabic at that time, obliterating the distinction between nominative and genitive case in the singular, leaving the accusative the only marked case:

Translation	Original Greek transcription	Arabic approximate transcription
ʾAws son of ʿūḏ (?)	Αυσος Ουδου	أوس عوذ
son of Bannāʾ son of Kazim	Βαναου Χαζιμ	بناء كازم
the ʾidāmite came	μου αλΙδαμι αθα	الإدامي أتو
because of scarcity; he came	οα μισειαζ αθαοευ̣	من شحاص أتو
to Bannāʾ in this region	α Βαναα αδαυρα	بناء الدور
and they pastured on fresh herbage	αουα ειραυ βακλα	ويرعو بقل
during Kānūn	βιΧανου	بكانون

Safaitic (ca. 3rd – 4th century AD)
	Triptote	Diptote	Dual	Masculine plural	Feminine plural
Nominative	∅..الـ (ʾal-)...-∅	-∅	الـ)..ـَان) (ʾal-)...-ān	الـ)..ـُون) (ʾal-)...-ūn	الـ)..ـَات) (ʾal-)...-āt
Accusative	الـ..ـَا (ʾal-)...-a	-∅	الـ)..ـَيْن) (ʾal-)...-ayn	الـ)..ـِين) (ʾal-)...-īn	الـ)..ـَات) (ʾal-)...-āt
Genitive	∅..(الـ) (ʾal-)...-∅	-∅	الـ)..ـَيْن) (ʾal-)...-ayn	الـ)..ـِين) (ʾal-)...-īn	الـ)..ـَات) (ʾal-)...-āt

Classical Arabic however, shows a far more archaic system, essentially identical with that of Proto-Arabic:

Classical Arabic (ca. 7th century AD)
	Triptote		Diptote	Dual	Masculine plural	Feminine plural	
Nominative	ـٌ -un	الـ..ـُ ʾal-...-u	ـُ -u	الـ)..ـَانِ) (ʾal-)...-āni	الـ)..ـُونَ) (ʾal-)...-ūna	ـَاتٌ -ātun	الـ..ـَاتُ ʾal-...-ātu
Accusative	ـًا، ـً -an	الـ..ـَ ʾal-...-a	ـَ -a	الـ)..ـَيْنِ) (ʾal-)...-ayni	الـ)..ـِينَ) (ʾal-)...-īna	ـَاتٍ -ātin	الـ..ـَاتِ ʾal-...-āti
Genitive	ـٍ -in	الـ..ـِ ʾal-...-i	ـَ -a	الـ)..ـَيْنِ) (ʾal-)...-ayni	الـ)..ـِينَ) (ʾal-)...-īna	ـَاتٍ -ātin	الـ..ـَاتِ ʾal-...-āti

==== State ====
The definite article spread areally among the Central Semitic languages and it would seem that Proto-Arabic lacked any overt marking of definiteness. Besides dialects with no definite article, the Safaitic inscriptions exhibit about four different article forms, ordered by frequency: h-, ʾ-, ʾl-, and hn-. The Old Arabic of the Nabataean inscriptions exhibits almost exclusively the form ʾl-. Unlike the Classical Arabic article, the Old Arabic ʾl almost never exhibits the assimilation of the coda to the coronals; the same situation is attested in the Graeco-Arabica, but in A1 the coda assimilates to the following d, αδαυρα *ʾad-dawra الدورة 'the region'.

In Classical Arabic, the definite article takes the form al-, with the coda of the article exhibiting assimilation to the following dental and denti-alveolar consonants. Note the inclusion of palatal /ɕ/, which alone among the palatal consonants exhibits assimilation, indicating that assimilation ceased to be productive before that consonant shifted from Old Arabic /ɬ/:

Sun consonants in Classical Arabic
Dental		Denti-alveolar		Palatal
plain	emphatic	plain	emphatic	Palatal
		n n – ن		
		t t – ت	tˤ ṭ – ط	
		d d – د		
θ ṯ – ث		s s – س	sˤ ṣ – ص	
ð ḏ – ذ	ðˤ ẓ – ظ	z z – ز		
		ɕ (< *ɬ) ʃ – ش	ɮˤ ḍ – ض	
		l l – ل		
		r r – ر		

=== Verbs ===
==== Barth-Ginsberg alternation ====
Proto-Central Semitic, Proto-Arabic, various forms of Old Arabic, and some modern Najdi dialects to this day have alternation in the performative vowel of the prefix conjugation, depending on the stem vowel of the verb. Early forms of Classical Arabic allowed this alternation, but later forms of Classical Arabic levelled the /a/ allomorph:

	Pre-Classical (taltalah)		Classical
1 sg.	ʾi-rkabu	ʾa-qtulu	ʾa-...-u
2 m.sg.	ti-rkabu	ta-qtulu	ta-...-u
3 m.sg.	ya-rkabu (< *yi-)	ya-qtulu	ya-...-u
1 pl.	ni-rkabu	na-qtulu	na-...-u

== See also ==
- Arabic in Islam
- Quranic Arabic Corpus
- Arabic–English Lexicon
