= Adang =

Adang may refer to:

== People ==
=== Given names ===
- Adang Daradjatun (born 1949), Indonesian politician and former police general
- Adang Sudrajat (1962–2021), Indonesian medical doctor and politician

=== Surnames ===
- Camilla Adang (born 1960), Dutch associate professor of Islamic studies at Tel Aviv University
- Xavier Adang (born 2004), Cameroonian professional footballer

== Other uses ==
- Adang language, Papuan language spoken on the island of Alor in Indonesia
- Ko Adang, the second biggest island within Tarutao National Marine Park in Thailand

== See also ==
- Adeang, a surname
