= Ihsan Abbas =

Palestinian literary scholar and Arabist

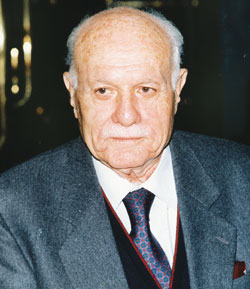
- Born: December 2, 1920; Ayn Ghazal, Mandatory Palestine
- Died: July 30, 2003 (aged 82); Amman, Jordan
- Awards: King Faisal International Prize

Academic background
- Education: Cairo University; Arab College
- Influences: Ibn Hazm, Kahlil Gibran

Academic work
- Main interests: Arabic literature, Islamic jurisprudence

Ihsan Abbas (December 2, 1920 – July 30, 2003) was a Palestinian professor at the American University of Beirut, and was considered a premier figure of Arabic and Islamic studies in the East and West during the 20th century. The "author of over one hundred books", during his career, Abbas was renowned as one of the foremost scholars of Arabic language and literature and was a respected literary critic. Upon his death, Abbas was eulogized by University College London historian Lawrence Conrad as a custodian of Arabic heritage and culture, and a figure whose scholarship had dominated the Middle East's intellectual and cultural life for decades.

== Life ==
Ihsan Abbas (إحسان عباس) was born in the former Palestinian village of Ayn Ghazal (عين غزال) near Haifa on December 2, 1920. As a child, the only books in his family's impoverished home were the Qur'an and a famous 15th-century Arabic encyclopedia known as Al Mustatraf fi kul Fan Mustazraf. In later life, Abbas would often sadden at the mention of the latter due to the memories it brought him.

Growing up in Mandate Palestine, Abbas completed high school in Haifa and Acre before attending the Arab College in Jerusalem from 1937 to 1941. Abbas then spent the next four years teaching at a college in Safed and went on to earn a Bachelor of Arts degree in Arabic literature from Cairo University in 1950. For the next ten years, Abbas traveled between his studies in Cairo, where he earned a Master of Arts and Doctor of Philosophy, and his work at Gordon Memorial College or, as it became known during his tenure, the University of Khartoum.

Abbas' master's thesis focused on Arabic literary culture in Sicily, while his doctoral dissertation was on the subject of religious asceticism and its influence in Umayyad culture. At the end of his tenure in Sudan, he was appointed to a professorship in the Arabic literature department of the American University of Beirut, a post which he held until his retirement in 1985. Abbas remained active, performing post-retirement research projects for the University of Jordan, especially on Andalusian Arabic literature and the translation of world literature into Arabic.

In addition to his many scholarly articles and reviews, Abbas wrote 75 books on Arabic literature, history, geography, law, science and political thought. His publications include seminal contributions to the founding principles of the modern edited texts and groundbreaking work on the Arabic literary legacy of Muslim Spain. His books on modern Arabic poetry include: Modern Trends in Contemporary Arabic Poetry, Badr Shakir Al-Sayyab, and Abd Al-Wahhab Al-Bayati. Some of Abbas' writings have become standard readings on Arabic literature in many universities around the world. Abbas also translated or co-translated 12 books, including The Poetics of Aristotle by Samuel Butcher, The Achievements of T.S. Eliot by Matthiessen, The Writer as Artist by Carlos Baker, The Arab Awakening by George Antonius, The Armed Vision by Stanley Hyman, and Moby Dick by Herman Melville.

Abbas was often at the center of intellectual life wherever he was living, and camaraderie with his colleagues was an important part of his life. Abbas was an avid participant in the cafe gatherings of Naguib Mahfouz in Cairo during the 1950s and 1960s. In the midst of the Lebanese Civil War in 1981, perhaps the primary intellectual activity in Beirut which continued despite the conflict was a weekly meeting of intellectuals and academics at Abbas' house.

In 1980 he received the prestigious King Faisal Prize in Arabic Language and Literature from the King Faisal Foundation with the citation:

Professor Ihsan Abbas was awarded the prize for his valuable contributions in the Arabic literary field, especially in the contemporary Arabic poetry studies, which is represented in: enriching contemporary Arabic literary studies and innovative research, the merger between the Arabic heritage and foreign languages literature, which assisted in embracing literary studies between different languages-literatures, the conformity and connection between biographies and poetry production of Al-Sai’ab, the precise mindfulness for details in biographies and their literary correspondents in poetry production, and the achievement of creation that is linked to authenticity, which provided him with well-formed perspectives, projection excellency, and the amusement of comparison; besides his language skills, his clear expression, and his methodology and commitment.

Abbas died in Amman, Jordan on July 30, 2003, at the age of 82 after a prolonged illness. On December 14, 2005, a day-long seminar was held at Birzeit University in Birzeit in honor of and to discuss Abbas' lifetime achievements and contributions to the fields of Arabic and Islamic studies; attendees included visiting scholars from Hebron University, Bethlehem University and An-Najah National University.

== Views ==
Abbas was a critic of the focus on the North–South divide, emphasizing improvement of quality of life in the Third World rather than conflict between the north and the south. Abbas was also distinguished as a Palestinian figure who defended contributions to Arabic and Islamic studies by Israeli scholarship, on one occasion reacting angrily to when a student claimed that Israeli academia was unable to master the Arabic language, a claim that Abbas found to be racist.

Abbas, like most other historians of Arab literature, held the view that classical biography and autobiography in the Arabic language tended to reduce the subject to a type rather than an individual. He also echoed the sentiment that in Arabic poetry, the description of the city as a genre and the details of urban life revealed the writer's ideological biases. Abbas was also a defender of Kahlil Gibran's maligned Al-Mawakib, considering it a measuring stick for the literature produced by the Arabic renaissance in the United States.

== Work ==
Abbas was a celebrated man of letters and a prolific writer during his lifetime. He republished Ibn Bassam's 12th-century biographical dictionary of the Iberian Peninsula's intellectuals, editing it into eight "mammoth" volumes. Abbas' analysis of Abd al-Wahhab Al-Bayati's poetry and the significance of Bayati's references to Sisyphus and Prometheus was criticized as Shmuel Moreh; Abbas saw the references as being philosophical allegory, while Moreh tied them to the fall of the Iraqi Communist Party. Abbas contributed significantly to the history of Arabic literature and writers, and was responsible for collecting and compiling the work of Abd al-Hamid al-Katib in 1988, uncovering archived letters between the Umayyad secretary and the empire's last caliph which shed light on the inner workings of the dynasty in its last days. He was also one of the few writers to critically analyze the Kharijites, a now extinct sect of Islam.

Though reserved in revealing his own beliefs, Abbas adhered to Sunni Islam and leaned toward the Zahiri school of Islamic jurisprudence. He was responsible for reviving the works of Ibn Hazm, one of the main philosophers of the school and of Islam in general, editing and republishing many of them and even uncovering previously unpublished works on Ibn Hazm's legal theory from various archives; Abbas' 1983 edition of Ibn Hazm's book on legal theory Ihkam is considered a key moment in Arab intellectual history and the modernist revival of Zahirite legal method.

Abbas also participated in a number of collaborative projects during his career. He served, alongside Clifford Edmund Bosworth, Jacob Lassner, Ehsan Yarshater and Franz Rosenthal, on the editorial board for William Montgomery Watt's book Muhammad at Mecca, itself a partial translation and summary of Muhammad ibn Jarir al-Tabari's History of the Prophets and Kings. From 1951 to 1952, Abbas assisted fellow scholar Ahmad Amin and his student Shawqi Daif in editing and republishing an anthology of Egyptian contributions to Arabic poetry during the Middle Ages, which had previously been thought to be minimal or non-existent. He was also a significant contributor to the cultural magazine Al-Arabi.

=== Edited and republished works ===
- Ahmed Mohammed al-Maqqari, Nafh at-tibb min ghusn al-andalus al-ratib. Beirut: 1968.
- Al-Baladhuri, Ansab al-Ashraf. Wiesbaden: 1979.
- Ibn al-Kattani, Kitab al-Tashbihat. Beirut: 1966.
- Ibn Bassam, Dhakhira fî mahâsin ahl al-Gazira. Beirut: 1979.
- Ibn Hazm, al-Ihkam fi usul al-ahkam. Beirut: Dar al-Afaq al-Jadida, 1980.
- Ibn Hazm, Al-Taqrib li Hadd al-Mantiq bi al-Alfaz al-`Ammiyya. Beirut: 1959.
- Ibn Hazm, Rasa`il Ibn Hazm al-Andalusi. Beirut, 1981.
- Ibn Hazm, Ṭawq al-Ḥamāmah. Cairo: Dar al-huda lil-thaqafah wal-nashr, 2002.
- Ibn Khallikan, Wafayāt al-aʿyān wa-anbāʾ abnāʾ az-zamān. Beirut: 1968–1977.
