= Adeang =

Adeang is a Nauruan surname. Notable people with the surname include:

- David Adeang (born 1969), Nauruan politician
- Kennan Adeang (1942–2011), Nauruan politician

== See also ==
- Adang (disambiguation)
