= Baqi ibn Makhlad =

Spanish Islamic jurist (820–889)

Pillar of hadith in the West Abu Abd al-Rahman Baqi ibn Makhlad al-Andalusi
- أبو عبد الرحمن بقي بن مخلد الأندلسي

Personal life
- Born: Baqi ibn Makhlad; 820 Córdoba, Spain,
- Died: 889 Córdoba, Spain
- Flourished: 9th century
- Home town: Córdoba, Spain
- Era: Islamic Golden Age
- Notable work(s): Musnad Baqi ibn Makhlad, Tafseer al-Baqi
- Education: al-Andalus, Mecca, Medina, and Baghdad

Religious life
- Religion: Islam

Muslim leader
- Teacher: Ahmad ibn Hanbal

Abu Abd al-Rahman Baqi ibn Makhlad al-Andalusi or simply known as Baqi ibn Makhlad (820-889), was a Andalusi jurist, mufassir, soldier, and the founder of the earliest hadith school in Islamic Spain. Nicknamed as the Pillar of hadith in the West , ibn Makhlad compiled the Musnad Baqi ibn Makhlad, the largest hadith book collection ever compiled, containing over 100,000 narrations, which included narrations from more than 300 companions of the Islamic prophet Muhammad. Most of its collections were lost following the Spanish Reconquista, resulting in the disappearance of one of the most significant western contributions to hadith literature. A student of Imam Ahmad ibn Hanbal, Baqi ibn Makhlad also authored Tafsir al-Baqi, which according to Ibn Hazm was the greatest tafsir ever to be written, even greater than Tafsir al-Tabari.

He had a close relationship with Emirs such as Muhammad I and al-Mundhir ibn Muhammad, who often protected him when some Maliki scholars were against him. Later, al-Mundhir also offered Baqi ibn Makhlad the role of judge, but Baqi declined the offer.

== Life and career ==
Baqi ibn Makhlad was born in Córdoba, Spain, during the Islamic Golden Age. From a young age age, he was deeply committed to seeking religious knowledge. His on foot journey from Spain to Baghdad to study under the Imam Ahmad ibn Hanbal, who was under political restrictions at the time, became a prominent event among scholars. To avoid detection, Baqi disguised himself as a beggar and secretly received hadith lessons from Imam Ahmad. Through this effort, he was able to collect around 300 hadiths directly from him.

He was also active in defending Islam and reportedly took part in 72 battles.

Abu Abdul Malik Ahmad bin Muhammad, a student of Imam Qurtubi, described Baqi ibn Makhlad as a man of great physical endurance and humility, stating that he was tall, strong, and had tough endurance in walking. He was never seed on a ride and was humble and unpretentious, and would always attend the funeral prayers.

== Legacy ==
Imam Baqi ibn Makhlad left a strong legacy in the field of Hadith sciences. His efforts helped preserve Hadith knowledge in Iberian Peninsula for five centuries and influenced scholars for later generations. After the Spanish Reconquista, many Islamic books and libraries were destroyed and most of Imam Baqi’s writings were lost. The resulted in the loss of one of the most essential European contributions to hadith literature.

Ad-Dahabi praised him highly, saying that no one of his time was like him in both knowledge and practice. He made Spain a center for hadith learning, along with Muhammad ibn Wadaah.

There was an unconfirmed report in November 2014, circulated via social media, that a manuscript of the Tafseer of Baqi ibn Makhlad was discovered in Turkey.
