= Muhammad Abu Zahra =

Egyptian Islamic scholar (1898–1974)

- محمد أبو زهرة

Personal life
- Born: 29 March 1898 El-Mahalla El-Kubra
- Died: 1974 (aged 75–76)
- Education: Dār al-ʿUlūm

Religious life
- Religion: Islam
- Denomination: Sunnī
- Jurisprudence: Hanafi
- Creed: Maturidi

Muhammad Abu Zahra (Note: Arabic: محمد أبو زهرة) (1898–1974) was an Egyptian Islamic scholar and influential Hanafi jurist. He occupied a number of positions; he was a lecturer of Islamic law at Al-Azhar University and a professor at Cairo University. He was also a member of the Islamic Research Academy. His works include Abu Hanifa, Malik and al-Shafi'i.

== Biography ==
Abu Zahra was born on March 29, 1898, in El-Mahalla El-Kubra, the second largest city in the Nile Delta. In 1913, he completed high school and enrolled in the Ahmadi Madrasa in Tanta. In 1916, he scored highest on the entry examination for the judiciary institute in the Gharbia Governorate despite being several years younger and less experienced than his colleagues. Having been rooted in traditional Azharite education, and never having studied in Europe or in Egyptian Westernized schools, Abu Zahra has been criticized by Orientalists as having a superficial grasp of Western methods.

He taught at al-Azhar's faculty of theology and later, as Professor of Islamic law at Cairo University. Between 1933 and 1942, he taught courses on the history of religions, denominations and sects at Azhar, during which time his lectures on comparative religion and Christianity were given, though the latter were not published until 1965.

His books include biographies of Abū Ḥanīfa, Malik ibn Anas, Al-Shafi'i, Ahmad ibn Hanbal, Zayd ibn Ali, Ali ibn al-Husayn Zayn al-'Abidin, Ja'far as-Sadiq, Dawud al-Zahiri, Ibn Hazm and Ibn Taymiyyah, as well as works on personal status, endowments (waqf), property, and crime and punishment in Islamic law.

== Views on Salafi movement and Salafi Theology ==
Based on Abu'l-Faraj ibn al-Jawzi's criticism of Athari-Hanbalis, Muhammad Abu Zahra deduced that Salafi aqidah is located somewhere between ta'tili and tashbih.

=== Views on the Wahhabi movement ===
Regarding Wahhabism, Abu Zahra said: "The Wahhabis exaggerated [and bowdlerized] Ibn Taymiyya's positions ... The Wahhabis did not restrain themselves to proselytism only, but resorted to warmongering against whoever disagreed with them on the grounds that they were fighting innovation (bid`a), and innovations are an evil that must be fought.... Whenever they were able to seize a town or city they would come to the tombs and turn them into ruins and destruction ... and they would destroy whatever mosques were with the tombs also.... Their brutality did not stop there but they also came to whatever graves were visible and destroyed them also. And when the ruler of the Hijaz regions caved in to them they destroyed all the graves of the Companions and razed them to the ground.... In fact, it has been noticed that the Ulema of the Wahhabis consider their own opinions correct and not possibly wrong, while they consider the opinions of others wrong and not possibly correct. More than that, they consider what others than themselves do in the way of erecting tombs and circumambulating them, as near to idolatry.... In this respect they are near the Khawarij who used to declare those who dissented with them apostate and fight them as we already mentioned."

== Views on Ahmadiyya Movement ==
According to Muhammad Abu Zahra, Ghulam Ahmad deviated from the mainstream aqidah of Islam due to his distinct views which is not shared by any other Schools of Islamic theology. First of all, Ghulam claimed that he found the grave of Jesus which is not accepted by any other Islamic school of divinity. In addition, Ghulam Ahmad conceded that the soul and the power of Messiah incarnated to his body due to his discovery of Jesus's grave. Because of this reason, his words are indisputable and absolute (Haqq). Moreover, Ahmad declared that he was authorized by Allah (Jalla Jalaalahoo) to make any revisions and modernization of Dīn, since he is the Mahdi. Furthermore, Ghulam does not give permission to Ahmadi-Women to get married with the other Muslim-Men of non-Ahmadi Muslim sects. This is clearly admission of the Muslims of the other madhhabs as Non-Muslims. Therefore, it is a justification that non-Ahmadis are being considered as Non-Muslims (according to the theological discourse developed) by Mirza Ghulam Ahmad.

== Works ==
Abu Zahra wrote over a dozen books, amongst them:

- Tarikh al-Madhahib al-Islamiyya (History of the Islamic Schools)
- al-'Alaqat al-Dawliyah fi al-Islam (International Relations in Islam)
- Zahrat al-Tafasir.
- Al-Jarīmah wa al-‛Uqūbah fī al-Fiqh al-Islāmī.
- Al-Mujtama‛ al-Insānī fī Zill al-Islām. (Human Society in the Shade of Islam)
- Sīrah Khātam al-Nabiyyīn.
- Tanzīm al-Islām lil-Mujtama‛.
- Ilm Usul al-Fiqh.
