= Camilla Adang =

Dutch professor of Islamic studies (born 1960)

- קמילה אדנג
- Born: 1960 (age 65–66); Bussum, Netherlands
- Known for: Muslim–Jewish polemics, studies on Ibn Hazm

Academic background
- Education: Radboud University Nijmegen (PhD)

Academic work
- Discipline: Islamic studies
- Institutions: Tel Aviv University

Camilla Adang (Hebrew: קמילה אדנג; born 1960) is a Dutch associate professor of Islamic studies at Tel Aviv University in Tel Aviv, Israel.

== Biography ==
Adang was born in Bussum, Netherlands in 1960. Adang completed her doctorate in Islamic studies at Radboud University Nijmegen in Nijmegen.

== Career ==
Adang was a fellow at the Netherlands Institute for Advanced Study in Wassenaar from September 2009 to June 2010. While there, she published a number of works on the life of Medieval Andalusian theologian Ibn Hazm and his views. During this time, she also contributed to a book on inter-religious polemics and rational theology. Adang was also a fellow at The Woolf Institute in Cambridge as of 2011. During this time, she delivered a seminar on Muslim-Jewish polemics in Medieval Spain which was noted for Adang's definition of Muslim fatwas are merely legal verdicts, rather than "death sentences" as popularly portrayed in the media, in addition to chairing a roundtable discussion of linguistic influences on Judeo-Muslim exchanges.

Adang has also written multiple encyclopedia articles and research papers on Muslim-Jewish polemics.
