= Sabine Schmidtke =

German scholar of Islamic studies (born 1964)

Academic background
- Education: Hebrew University of Jerusalem; School of Oriental and African Studies, University of London; University of Oxford

Academic work
- Institutions: University of Bonn; Free University of Berlin; Hebrew University of Jerusalem; Katz Center for Advanced Judaic Studies; Tel Aviv University; Leiden University; Institute for Advanced Study
- Main interests: Islamic studies

Sabine Schmidtke is a German academic, historian, and scholar of Islamic studies. She is Professor of Islamic Intellectual History at the Institute for Advanced Study in Princeton. Schmidtke was elected Member to the American Philosophical Society in 2017. She was appointed Corresponding Member of the Austrian Academy of Sciences in 2021.

== Education and career ==
Schmidtke earned an undergraduate degree (summa cum laude) from the Hebrew University of Jerusalem in 1986 and an M.A. from the School of Oriental and African Studies, University of London in 1987. She got her Ph.D. from the University of Oxford in 1990. From 1991 to 1999 she was a diplomat in the German Foreign Office.

From 1997 to 1999 she was a lecturer in Islamic studies at the University of Bonn and did her Habilitation while there. From 1999 to 2014 she taught Islamic Studies at the Free University of Berlin where she was a Founding Director of the Department of "Intellectual History of the Islamic World". She also held fellowships at the Hebrew University of Jerusalem (2002, 2003; 2005-2006), the Institute for Advanced Study in Princeton (2008-2009), the Katz Center for Advanced Judaic Studies (University of Pennsylvania) in Philadelphia (2010), Tel Aviv University (2011), and the Scaliger Institute in Leiden University (2013).

In July 2014 she became Professor of Islamic Intellectual History in the School of Historical Studies at the Institute for Advanced Study in Princeton.

== Bibliography ==
- Die Bibel in den Augen muslimischer Gelehrter: mit einem Geleitwort von Martin Grötschel, Research Unit Intellectual History of the Islamate World: Freie Universität Berlin, 2013, ISBN 3981561716
- The Theology of al-ʿAllāma al-Ḥillī K. Schwarz, Berlin, 1991, ISBN 3922968937
- Schmidtke, Sabine, ed. (2016) [2014]. The Oxford Handbook of Islamic Theology. Oxford and New York: Oxford University Press. doi:10.1093/oxfordhb/9780199696703.001.0001. ISBN 9780199696703. LCCN 2016935488.
