= Maribel Fierro =

Spanish Middle Eastern scholar (born 1956)

María Isabel Fierro Bello (born 1956) is a researcher on Middle Eastern studies at the Spanish National Research Council's humanities branch in Madrid, Spain. Fierro has served as a visiting scholar at the University of Chicago Divinity School in Chicago, the School for Advanced Studies in the Social Sciences in Paris, The Institute for Advanced Studies at The Hebrew University of Jerusalem and the Institute for Advanced Study in Princeton. In 2020 she was elected to the American Philosophical Society.

== Works ==
=== Conference proceedings ===
- Public violence in Islamic societies. Edited with Christian Lange. Edinburgh: Edinburgh University Press, 2009. 304 pgs., 24 cm. ISBN 9780748637317

=== Edited works ===
- The New Cambridge History of Islam; The Western Islamic World Eleventh to Eighteenth Centuries, vol. 2. New York: Cambridge University Press, 2010. ISBN 9780521839570

=== Lectures ===
- "Heresy and Political Legitimacy in al-Andalus," presented at the University of Chicago Divinity School in Chicago, Friday, October 14, 2011.
- "The Turban and its Meanings in Al-Andalus," presented at the UIUC College of Liberal Arts and Sciences in Urbana, Illinois, Oct 17, 2011.

=== Original works ===
- Abd al-Rahman III: The First Cordoban Caliph. Oxford: Oneworld Publications, 2005. 160 pgs.
