= Al-Muhalla =

Book by Ibn Hazm

- Author: Ibn Hazm
- Original title: المحلى
- Language: Arabic
- Subject: Islamic Jurisprudence

Kitāb al-Muḥallā bi-l-Athār fi Sharh Al-Mujalla Bil Ikhtisar (Arabic: المحلى بالآثار في شرح المجلى بالاختصار), also known as Al-Muhalla ("The Sweetened [or Adorned] by Traditions, Explaining Revelations in Brief") is a book of Islamic law and jurisprudence by Ibn Hazm, an 11th century Sunni Islamic scholar. It is considered one of the primary sources of the Zahirite (lit. apparent, manifest) school within Sunni Islam.

== Description ==
Kitāb al-Muḥallā bi-l-Athār is, according to Ibn Hazm himself, is a commentary of a more extensive work, as evidenced from the very name and the author's preface. This book, which is now lost, was called al-Mujallā المجلى. The book is noted for the author's view that a Muslim is not obliged to fulfill every promise; specifically, that a Muslim who promised to commit a criminal act shouldn't fulfill such a promise.

== Reception ==
It is his commentary on his own al-Mujallā ("The Brilliant Treatise"), and it is considered a masterpiece of fiqh literature.

A site describes it:

This book is a wealth of scholarship, in which Ibn Hazm discusses each question separately. On each question, he cites the views of earlier scholars of high achievement, not restricting himself to the views of the four schools of Fiqh, but also citing the rulings of scholars like al-Hassan al-Basri (d. 110), al-Laith ibn Saad (d. 175), Ata' (d. 114), Sufyan al-Thawri (d. 161), al-Awza'ie (d. 157), etc. He also quotes the evidence they cite in support of their views. He then discusses why he considers their views incorrect, and produces the evidence in support of his own view. This makes for a highly scholarly discussion. Many scholars describe Al-Muhalla as the encyclopaedia of Islamic Fiqh. Indeed, it has preserved many of the views of early scholars whose work was either not documented or lost. The only problem with Al-Muhalla is that Ibn Hazm is often scathing in his criticism of his opponents. Yet there is no doubt that he is an honest defender of what he considers to be the truth. Any scholar who wants to exercise ijtihad, in order to arrive at rulings for questions encountered in present day life cannot overlook Al-Muhalla.

Muhalla has been a significant work for proponents of the Zahirite school of law. During the Almohad Caliphate in particular, learning it was standard for the training of the judiciary. During the Mamluk Sultanate in Egypt and Syria, the Zahiri Revolt was inspired in part by active studying and teaching of the book, in addition to separate political grievances.

In the modern era, this trend has continued with adherents of the school; Pakistani scholar Badi' ud-Din Shah al-Rashidi, for example, gave classes based on the book in Masjid al-Haram, Islam's holiest site, in Mecca. Similarly, Yemeni scholar Muqbil bin Hadi al-Wadi'i taught the book in Al-Masjid an-Nabawi, Islam's second holiest site, while in Medina. Abu Abd al-Rahman Ibn Aqil al-Zahiri, a biographer of Ibn Hazm, sought permission to teach the book in Riyadh, though the predominantly Hanbalite religious establishment didn't grant approval. The Ahl-i Hadith movement in India and Pakistan frequently use the book as a teaching tool as well.

Ibn Abd al-Salam said: "I did not see, in all the books of knowledge in Islam, anything like Ibn Hazm's al-Muhalla nor like Shaykh Muwaffaq al-Din's Ibn Qudama al-Mughni." Al-Dhahabi says, "Shaykh `Izz al-Din is right, and the third is Al-Bayhaqi's al-Sunan al-Kubra, and the fourth Ibn 'Abd al-Barr's al-Tamhid. Whoever obtains these volumes, if he is one of the intelligent muftis and perseveres in reading them - he is truly a `alim."

Muhammad Abu Zahra says, "It is truly and accurately the pillar of Islamic Fiqh, and it is a highly useful book. Had it not been for the usage of scathing remarks and some phrases that are evidently inappropriate and out of place, it would have been the best book ever on Sunni Fiqh.

== Editions ==
- It is published in several editions, sometimes in 9 volumes and sometimes in 12
- Beirut: The Commercial Office of Printing and Publishing, no date.

== See also ==
- List of Sunni books
