= Ibn al-Kattani =

Moorish scholar, 951–1029

- Born: Abu Abd Allah Muhammad ibn al-Husayn Ibn al-Kattani al-Madhiji; 951; Córdoba, Caliphate of Cordoba
- Died: 1029; Zaragoza, Al-Andalus
- Occupations: Philosopher, medical doctor, astrologer, poet

Philosophical work
- Notable works: The Treatment of Dangerous Diseases Appearing Superficially on the Body

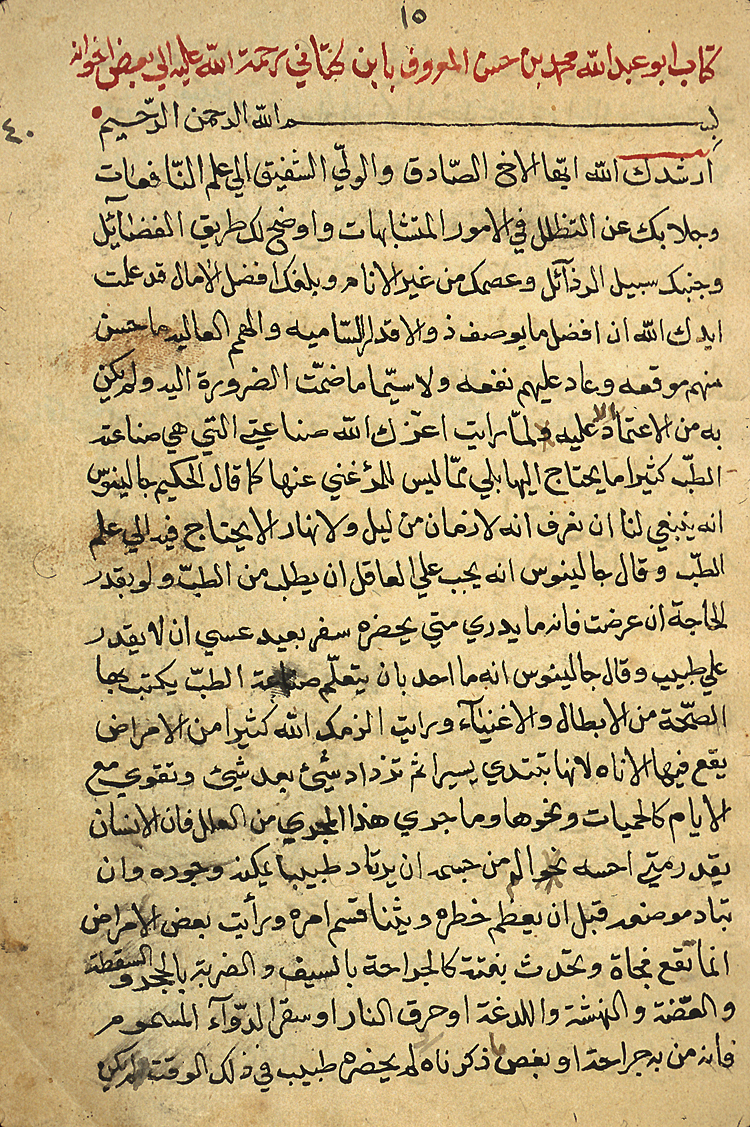
The Treatment of Dangerous Diseases Appearing Superficially on the Body by Abī ‘Abd Allāh Muḥammad ibn Ḥasan Ibn al-Kattānī.

Abu Abd Allah Muhammad ibn al-Husayn Ibn al-Kattani al-Madhiji (Arabic: ابن الكتاني) (951–1029), sometimes nicknamed "al-Mutatabbib" (المتطبب 'the medical doctor'), was a well-known Arab scholar, philosopher, medical doctor, astrologer, man of letters, and poet.

Born in Córdoba in the Caliphate of Cordoba, he wrote books on logic, inference and deduction.

For some time he was the personal medical doctor of Al-Mansur Ibn Abi Aamir, sultan of al-Andalus, and wrote The Treatment of Dangerous Diseases Appearing Superficially on the Body (Mu`alajat al-amrad al-khatirah al-badiyah `ala al-badan min kharij). It was cited by later writers, but thought to be now lost, until a copy of it was discovered among the manuscripts now at the National Library of Medicine. Much of the treatise is on the subject of poisonous bites.

Al-Kattani also wrote an anthology of Andalusian poetry, and became especially famous by his book on metaphor in Andalusian poetry.

He died in Zaragoza in 1029.

== Bibliography ==
By Ibn al-Kittani:

- Kitab al-Tashbihat (translated by Wilhelm Hoenerbach 1973)

Secondary literature in Spanish:

- Bosch Vilá, J.: El Oriente Árabe en el desarrollo de la cultura de la Marca Superior; Madrid, 1954.
- Tomeo Lacrué, M.: Biografía Cientifica de la Universidad de Zaragoza; Zaragoza, 1962.
- Martínez Loscos, C.: Los orígenes de la Medicina en Aragón, Cuadernos de Historia J. Zurita, n.° 6–7, Zaragoza, 1958.

In German:

- Dichterische Vergleiche der Andalus-Araber. I und II by Wilhelm Hoenerbach

Review:

- Farida Abu-Haidar, Bulletin of the School of Oriental and African Studies, University of London, Vol. 37, No. 2 (1974), p. 460

== External sources ==
- Ibn Hazm of Cordova on Logic
