= Abu Abd al-Rahman Ibn Aqil al-Zahiri =

Saudi Arabian polymath

- أبو عبد الرحمن ابن عقيل الظاهري
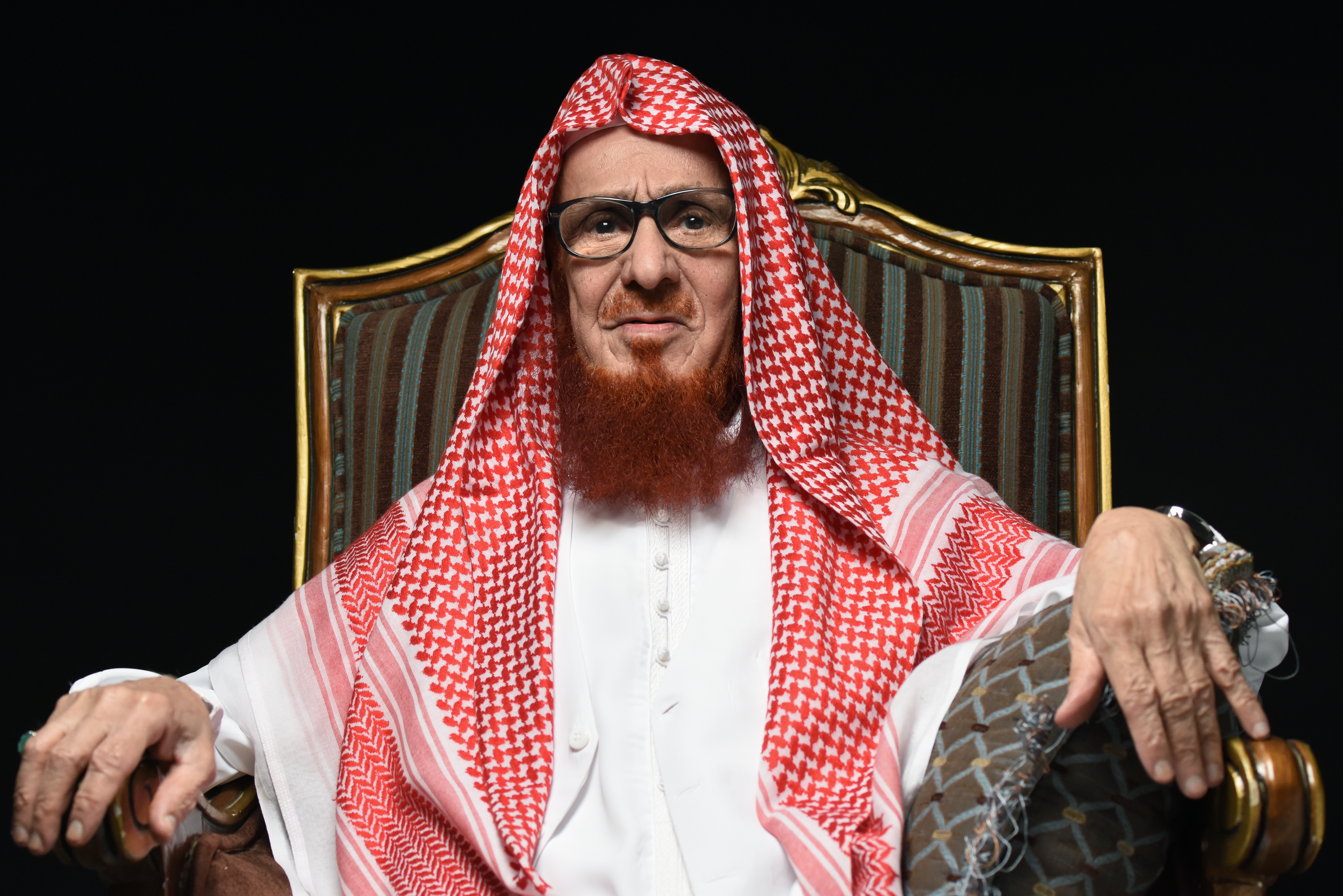

Personal life
- Born: Muhammad bin Umar bin Abd al-Rahman bin Abd Allah al-Aqil; 1938 (age 87–88) Shaqra, Saudi Arabia
- Era: Contemporary Islamic philosophy
- Region: Islamic philosophy
- Main interest(s): Fiqh, Zahirism

Religious life
- Religion: Islam
- Jurisprudence: Ẓāhirī
- Creed: Athari

Muslim leader
- Influenced by: Dawud al-Zahiri, Ibn Hazm, Sadiq Siddiq Azhari (from Egypt), Saleh Ibn Ghosoun, Muhammad bin Abdul Rahman bin Daoud, Abdul-Razzaq Afify, Abd al-Fattah Abu Ghudda

Muhammad bin Umar bin Abd al-Rahman bin Abd Allah al-Aqil, better known as Abu Abd al-Rahman Ibn Aqil al-Zahiri, is a Saudi Arabian polymath. He has, at various times, been referred to as a theologian, jurist, historian, ethnographer, geographer, poet, critic and author. As a member of Saudi Arabia's "Golden Generation," he knew of life both during the poverty of the pre-oil boom era and the prosperity of the 1950s onward.

== Personal life ==
Ibn Aqil was born in the city of Shaqra in Saudi Arabia's central Najd region in 1938. His has been married three times, during which he sired twenty-six children. His current wife is from Egypt. Ibn Aqil also owns a bookstore, "Dar Ibn Hazm," in the Al-Suwaidi district where he currently lives, and is the imam of a nearby mosque.

Ibn Aqil had a complicated friendship and, later, rivalry with fellow Arab philosopher Abdullah al-Qasemi. Having known al-Qasemi before he converted from Islam to atheism, Ibn Aqil met al-Qasemi for a debate in the Garden City district of Downtown Cairo. After a long discussion regarding the existence of God and Theodicy, Ibn Aqil authored the book A Night in Garden City as an account of the debate.

== Career ==
After receiving his primary and secondary education in Shaqra, Ibn Aqil relocated to Riyadh and enrolled in Imam Muhammad ibn Saud Islamic University, which at the time was a brand new institution. He earned a Bachelor of Science in Law from the college of Islamic law, and a Master of Theology degree in exegesis of the Qur'an. During this time, Ibn Aqil was a student of former Saudi Grand Mufti Abd al-Aziz ibn Baz and Ibn Humaid, another high-ranking cleric. Ibn Aqil spent most of his tutelage under Abu Turab al-Zahiri.

In his twenties and early thirties, Ibn Aqil worked as a lawyer within Saudi Arabia's theocratic justice system. He was eventually placed in administrative positions for public education in the country's eastern province in Dammam, and then later moved to the legal department in the Ministry of Municipal and Rural Affairs. Upon returning to Riyadh, he founded and served as president of the Riyadh Literary Society, and began writing a regular column for the Arabic daily Al Jazirah; while he continues the latter endeavor, he relinquished his presidency of the Society and joined the general membership. From the 1960s to the 1980s, Ibn Aqil served in several posts including that of a legal adviser to the Riyadh Municipal Agency, auditor of the General Employees Bureau and Director of Services for the General Administration of Girls' Education.

In the past, he was the host of "Tafsir al-Tafasir" or "exegesis of the exegeses," a religious program which was broadcast daily on the radio and weekly on television. Building on his graduate background, Ibn Aqil would systematically collect all major explanations of the Qur'an within Sunni Islam and attempt to integrate all of them, weighing the views of various theologians. Although the program was discontinued in the late 1980s, Ibn Aqil restarted his broadcasts in 2010 from where he had left off. The King Faisal Center for Research and Islamic Studies had invited Ibn Aqil to grant a symposium on the topic of comparative exegesis five years prior, likely reigniting public interest.

Currently, Ibn Aqil has mostly retired from public life. In addition to his renewed Qur'an study broadcasts, he is a member of the Academy of the Arabic Language in Cairo, the Arabic Language Academy at Mecca, and still serves as the editor-in-chief of an academic journal named after the UNESCO World Heritage Site Diriyah, which he founded and which holds its headquarters on his family estate.

== Views ==
Ibn Aqil has defined the problems of Saudi society as coming both from secularists on one end of the spectrum and Muslim clerics delivering hasty and erroneous proclamations on the other. Being a part of Saudi Arabia's "Golden Generation," Ibn Aqil has generally been supportive of the House of Saud and the Saudi government, and an opponent of its critics among both liberal modernists and radical extremists.

Recently, Ibn Aqil called for the Saudi government to strip a dissident journalist of his citizenship due to his sharp criticisms of the Consultative Assembly of Saudi Arabia. On the other end of the spectrum, Ibn Aqil engaged in a public series of exchanges with fellow cleric Abdul-Rahman al-Barrak in 2011 due to the former's refusal to adopt a formal position on theological issues debated during the Mihna, a rare Medieval-era inquisition within Islam perpetrated by rationalists against their orthodox counterparts. Ibn Aqil has also fallen into conflict with Egyptian cleric Yusuf al-Qaradawi in a series of back-and-forth columns, though Qardawi did not mention Ibn Aqil by name. Ibn Aqil, who has expressed skepticism about the goals and results of the Arab Spring, considered Qardawi's various positions during the movement hypocritical and contradictory, charges which Qardawi denied.

== Works ==
Being a jurist and scholar of the Zahirite school of law within Sunni Islam, Ibn Aqil is also the current era's primary biographer of Zahirite theologian Ibn Hazm, having written detailed accounts even of Ibn Hazm's individual conflicts with rival jurist Abu al-Walid al-Baji. His bookstore is named after the Andalusian author, and Ibn Aqil has authored a number of books on the life and career of Ibn Hazm. The largest of these books is Nawadir al-Imam Ibn Hazm, a collection of Ibn Hazm's smaller, harder-to-find works, such as his poem on the fundamental principles of Zahirite law. He has also delivered a lecture explaining Ibn Rushd's attempts to reconcile philosophy and religion at the International Averroes Symposium, co-sponsored by UNESCO in Carthage between 16 and 22 February in 1998.

In addition to A Night in Garden City, other titles of some note are Descartes Between Scepticism and Certainty and The History of Najd During the Colloquial Epoch. Perhaps stemming from his philosophical debates with al-Qasemi, reconciliation between reason and revelation has been a recurring theme in Ibn Aqil's work.

== Bibliography ==
=== Biographical works ===
- Sidu, Amin Sulayman. Shaykh al-katabah Abu Abd al-Rahman ibn 'Aqil al-Zahiri. Riyadh Literary Club, 2004. ISBN 978-9960621319

=== Edited works ===
- al-Baji. Tahqiq al-madhhab. Ed. Abu Abd al-Rahman Ibn Aqil al-Zahiri. Riyadh: 1983.
- Al-Humaydī. al-Dhahab al-masbuk fi wa'z al-muluk. Eds. Abu Abd al-Rahman Ibn Aqil al-Zahiri and Dr. Abd al-Halim Uways. Riyadh: Dar Alam al-Kutub, 1982. 235 pages. Kings and rulers.
- Ibn Hazm. Risalah al-Talkhis li-wujuh al-takhlis. Riyadh: Dar Ibn Hazm, 2005. With Abu Abd Allah Sa'id ibn Khalaf al-Shammari al-Zahiri.
- Ibn Jurays, Rashid ibn 'Ali al-Hanbali, d. 1880 or 81. Muthir al-wajd fi ansab muluk Najd. Eds. Abu Abd al-Rahman Ibn Aqil al-Zahiri, Abd al-Wahid Muhammad Raghib and Abd al-Rahman ibn 'Abd al-Latif Al al-Shaykh. 1st Ed. Darat al-Malik 'Abd al-'Aziz, 1999. 136 pages; 25 cm.
- Ibn Ḥazm, al-Taqrīb li-Ḥadd al-Manṭiq: bil-Alfāẓ al-ʿĀmiyya wal-Amthila al-fiqhiyya, ed. by Abū ʿAbd al-Raḥmān b. ʿAqīl al-Ẓāhirī & ʿِAbd al-Ḥaqq Mullā Ḥaqqī al-Turkmānī (Beirut: Dār Ibn Ḥazm)

=== Original works ===
- al-Aql al-lughawi. Mecca: Meccan Literary Club, 1994. 327 pages; 24 cm. Arabic language. ISBN 9789960617060
- Al-naghm alladhi ahbabtuhu. Dar al-Watan, 1979. 110 pages. Arabic poetry.
- Dunya al-watha'iq. al-Dir'iyya i/2, 1998. Pgs. 264–326.
- Hayy Miri. Riyadh: Dar Ibn Hazm, 1996. 126 pages; 25 cm. ISBN 9789960795102
- Humum siyasiyah. 1998. ISBN 9789960795232
- Ibn Hazam Khilal Alf Aam. Lebanon: Dar al-Gharab al-Islami, 1982. 303 pages.
- Ibn La‘b¯un : hay¯atuhu wa-shi‘ruh. Kuwait: Mu'assasat J¯a'izat ‘Abd al-‘Az¯iz Sa‘¯ud al-B¯abat¯in lil-Ibd¯a‘ al-Shi‘r¯i, 1997. 624 pages; 24 cm.
- Kutub al-faharis wa-al-baramij: waqiuha wa-ahammiyatuha. Riyadh: Dar Ibn Hazm, 1996. 121 pages; 24 cm. ISBN 9789960795072
- Mabadi' fi nazariyat al-shi'r wa-al-jamal. 1st Ed. Ha'il: Ha'il Literary Club, 1998. 1 volume; 24 cm. Arabic poetry; history and criticism. ISBN 9960618331
- Mas¯a'il min t¯ar¯ikh al-Jaz¯irah al-‘Arab¯iyah. Riyadh: Mu'assasat D¯ar al-As¯alah, 1994. 4th ed. 295 pages; 24 cm.
- Min ahkam al-diyanah : ta'sil masa'il min al-ma'rifah al-shar'iyah, wa-tahrir masa'il tatbiqiyah. Riyadh: Dar Ibn Hazm lil-Nashr wa-al-Tawzi', 1998. 1 volume; 25 cm. Islamic law. ISBN 9960795276
- Muadalat fi kharait al-atlas: duwaywin shir. 1997. ISBN 9789960272740
- Najd f¯i ‘us¯ur al-‘¯amm¯iyah. Cairo: Matba‘at al-Taqaddum, 1974. 18 cm.
- al-Qasidah al-hadithah wa-a°ba al-tajawuz: dirasah tatbiqiyah li-usul al-iltizam wa-al-shart al-jamali. 1987. 286 pages. ASIN B0000D7274
- Shay min al-tabarih: sirah dhatiyah-- wa-humum thaqafiyah. Riyadh: Dar Ibn Hazm, 1995. ISBN 9789960795034
- Tahrir ba'd al-masa'il 'ala madh'hab al ashab. 1st Ed. Riyadh: Maktabat Dar al-Ulum, 1981.
- Y¯a s¯ahir al-barq li-Ab¯i al-‘Al¯a' al-Ma‘arr¯i. Jizan: Jizan Literary Club, 1995. 127 pages; 21 cm.
