= Al-Farisi =

Al-Farisi ('the Persian') is a surname. Notable people with the surname include:

- Salman al-Farisi (died 653 AD), a companion of the Islamic prophet Muhammad and the first Persian who converted to Islam.
- Kamāl al-Dīn al-Fārisī (died 1319 AD), optician and mathematician
- Muhammad ibn Abi Bakr al-Farisi (died 1278/1279 AD), astronomer born in Aden and author of al-Tuḥfa
