= The Ring of the Dove =

Treatise by Ibn Hazm

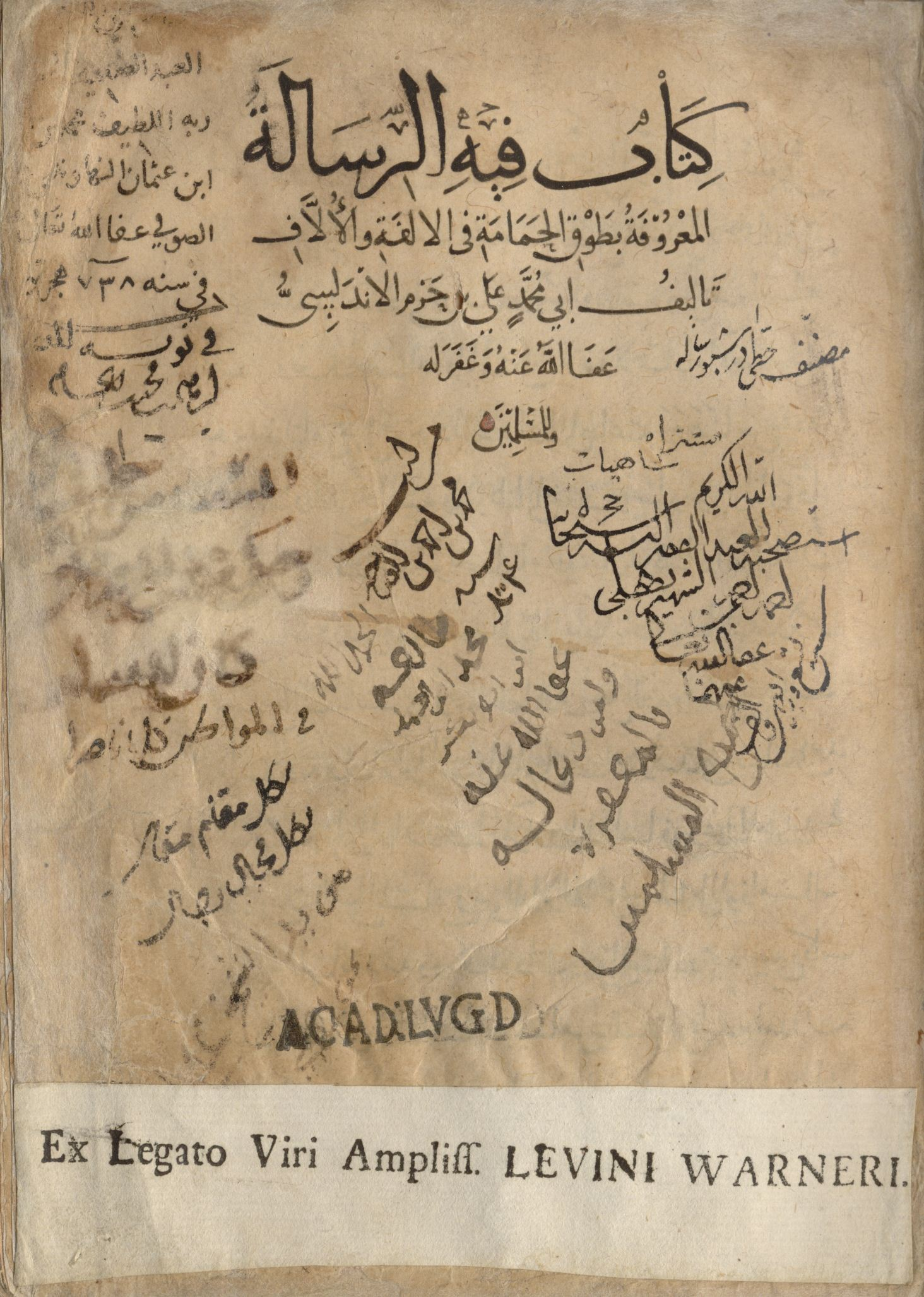
- The Ring of the Dove (Ms. Or. 927 in Leiden University Library)
- Author: Ibn Hazm
- Original title: طوق الحمامة
- Language: Arabic
- Subject: Love
- Published: 1022
- Publication place: Al-Andalus
- Original text: طوق الحمامة at Arabic Wikisource

The Ring of the Dove or Ṭawq al-Ḥamāmah (Arabic: طوق الحمامة) is a treatise on love written in the year 1022 by Ibn Hazm. Normally a writer of theology and law, Ibn Hazm produced his only work of literature with The Ring of the Dove. He was heavily influenced by Plato's Phaedrus, though the bulk of the work was still his own writing, rather than an anthology of other works. Although the human aspects of affection are the primary concern, the book was still written from the perspective of a devout Muslim, and as such chastity and restraint were common themes.

The book provides a glimpse into Ibn Hazm's own psychology. Ibn Hazm's teenage infatuation with one of his family's maids is often quoted as an example of the sort of chaste, unrequited love about which the author wrote.

The manuscript of Ṭawq al-ḥamāma (MS Or. 927) is held at Leiden University Libraries and is also available digitally.

The work has been published into English multiple times. A. R. Nykl of the Oriental Institute of Chicago translated the work and his translation appeared in 1931 and A. J. Arberry's translation was published in 1951.
