= Ibn 'Abd al-Barr =

Andalusian Islamic scholar (978–1071)

Yūsuf ibn 'Abd Allāh ibn Muhammad ibn 'Abd al-Barr al-Namarī
- يُوسُف بن عبد الله بن مُحمَّد بن عبد البر النمري

Personal life
- Born: 978 CE / 368 AH Córdoba, Caliphate of Córdoba
- Died: 1071 CE / 463 AH Shātibah (Xàtiva), Kingdom of Dénia
- Era: Medieval era
- Region: Al-Andalus
- Main interest(s): Islamic jurisprudence, Islamic theology, Hadith

Religious life
- Religion: Islam
- Denomination: Sunni
- Jurisprudence: Maliki
- Creed: Athari

Muslim leader
- Influenced by: Malik ibn Anas
- Influenced: Ibn Qayyim al-Jawziyya

Yūsuf ibn ʿAbd Allāh ibn Muḥammad ibn ʿAbd al-Barr, Abū ʿUmar al-Namarī al-Andalusī al-Qurṭubī al-Mālikī, commonly known as Ibn ʿAbd al-Barr (Arabic: ابن عبد البر) was an eleventh-century Maliki scholar and Athari theologian who served as the Qadi of Lisbon. He died in December 2, 1071 (aged 93).

== Biography ==
Ibn 'Abd al-Barr was born in 978 and died in 1071 in Xàtiva in Al-Andalus. According to Ibn Khallikan, Ibn Abd al-Barr sprung from the Arabian tribe of Namr ibn Qasit.

While initially having been an adherent of the Zahiri school of Muslim jurisprudence, Ibn Abd al-Barr later switched to the Maliki school, which was the officially recognized legal code of the Umayyad dynasty, under which he lived. His book on the three great Sunni jurists Malik ibn Anas, Al-Shafi'i and Abu Hanifa noticeably excluded both his former patron Dawud al-Zahiri and Ahmad ibn Hanbal. Ibn 'Abd al-Barr represented the traditionalist strand of the Maliki school. He is often referred to as the "Bukhari of the West." Ibn Abd al-Barr was a supporter of taqlid, or following an Islamic school of jurisprudence. Ibn Abd al-Barr wrote in his book, Jami' Bayan al-'Ilm wa Fadlihi: "The scholars do not differ on the point that the laymen must make Taqlid their respective Imams. They are the ones meant by the verse of the Quran in al-Nahl, (Arabic: وَمَاۤ أَرۡسَلۡنَا مِن قَبۡلِكَ إِلَّا رِجَالࣰا نُّوحِیۤ إِلَیۡهِمۡۖ فَسۡءَلُوۤا۟ أَهۡلَ ٱلذِّكۡرِ إِن كُنتُمۡ لَا تَعۡلَمُونَ, lit. 'And ask the people of knowledge if you do not know')... Similarly, the scholars do not differ on the point that the laymen are not permitted to give religious verdicts."

A custodian of the royal libraries the Umayyad Caliphate in Cordoba patronized, he taught in the Grand Mosque of Cordoba and its attached colleges.

== Works ==
Some of his works include:

- The Comprehensive Compilation of the Names of the Prophet's Companions (Arabic: الإستيعاب في معرفة الأصحاب, romanized: Al-Isti'ab fi ma'rifat al-ashab). In it, the author intended to list every person who met Muhammad Sallallahu 'Alaihi Wa Salam even once in their life;
- Jami' Bayan al-'Ilm wa Fadlihi.
- Al-Ajwiba al-Mû`iba ("The Comprehensive Answers");
- Al-`Aql wal-`Uqalâ' ("Reason and the People of Wisdom");
- Ash`âr Abî al-`Atâhiya ("The Poems of Abû al-`Atahiya[12]");
- Al-Bayân fî Tilâwat al-Qur'an ("The Exposition Concerning the Recitation of the Qur'ân");
- Al-Farâ'id ("The Laws of Inheritance");
- Al-Iktifâ' fî Qirâ'at Nâfi`in wa Abî `Amrin ("The Contentment in Nâfi` and Abû `Amr's Reading");
- Al-Inbâh `an Qabâ'il al-Ruwâh ("Drawing Attention to the Nomenclature of the Narrators' Tribes");
- Al-Insâf fî Asmâ' Allâh ("The Book of Fidelity: On the Names of Allâh");
- Al-Intiqâ' fî Fadâ'il al-Thalâthat al-A'immat al-Fuqahâ' Mâlik wal-Shâfi`î wa Abî Hanîfa ("The Hand-Picked Excellent Merits of the Three Great Jurisprudent Imâms: Mâlik, Shâfi`î, and Abû Hanîfa"). Shaykh `Abd al-Fattâh Abû Ghudda said the order in the title reflects the precedence of Madîna over Makka and that of Makka over al-Kûfa.
- Al-Istidhkâr li Madhhab `Ulamâ' al-Amsâr fîmâ Tadammanahu al-Muwatta' min Ma`ânî al-Ra'î wal-Athâr ("The Memorization of the Doctrine of the Scholars of the World Concerning the Juridical Opinions and the Narrations Found in Mâlik's Muwatta'");
- Jâmi` Bayân al-`Ilmi wa-Fadlihi wamâ Yanbaghî fî Riwâyatihi wa Hamlih ("Compendium Exposing the Nature of Knowledge and Its Immense Merit, and What is Required in the Process of Narrating it and Conveying it");
- Al-Kâfî fî Fiqh Ahl-Al-Madînah Al-Mâlikî ("The Sufficiency in the Mâliki school of the people of Al-Madînah");
- Al-Kunâ ("The Patronyms");
- Al-Maghâzî ("The Battles");
- Al-Qasd wal-Umam fî Nasab al-`Arab wal-`Ajam ("The Endeavors and the Nations: Genealogies of the Arabs and Non-Arabs");
- Al-Shawâhid fî Ithbât Khabar al-Wâhid ("The Supporting Evidence for Maintaining Lone-Narrator Reports [as a source for legal rulings]");
- Al-Tamhîd limâ fîl-Muwatta' min al-Ma`ânî wal-Asânîd ("The Facilitation to the Meanings and Chains of Transmission Found in Mâlik's Muwatta'");
- Al-Taqassî fî Ikhtisâr al-Muwatta' ("The Detailed Study in the Abridgment of the Muwatta'");

== See also ==
- Islamic scholars
