= Abu Ishaq of Kazerun =

Persian Sufi poet (c. 963 – c. 1035)

Abū Ishaq of Kazerun
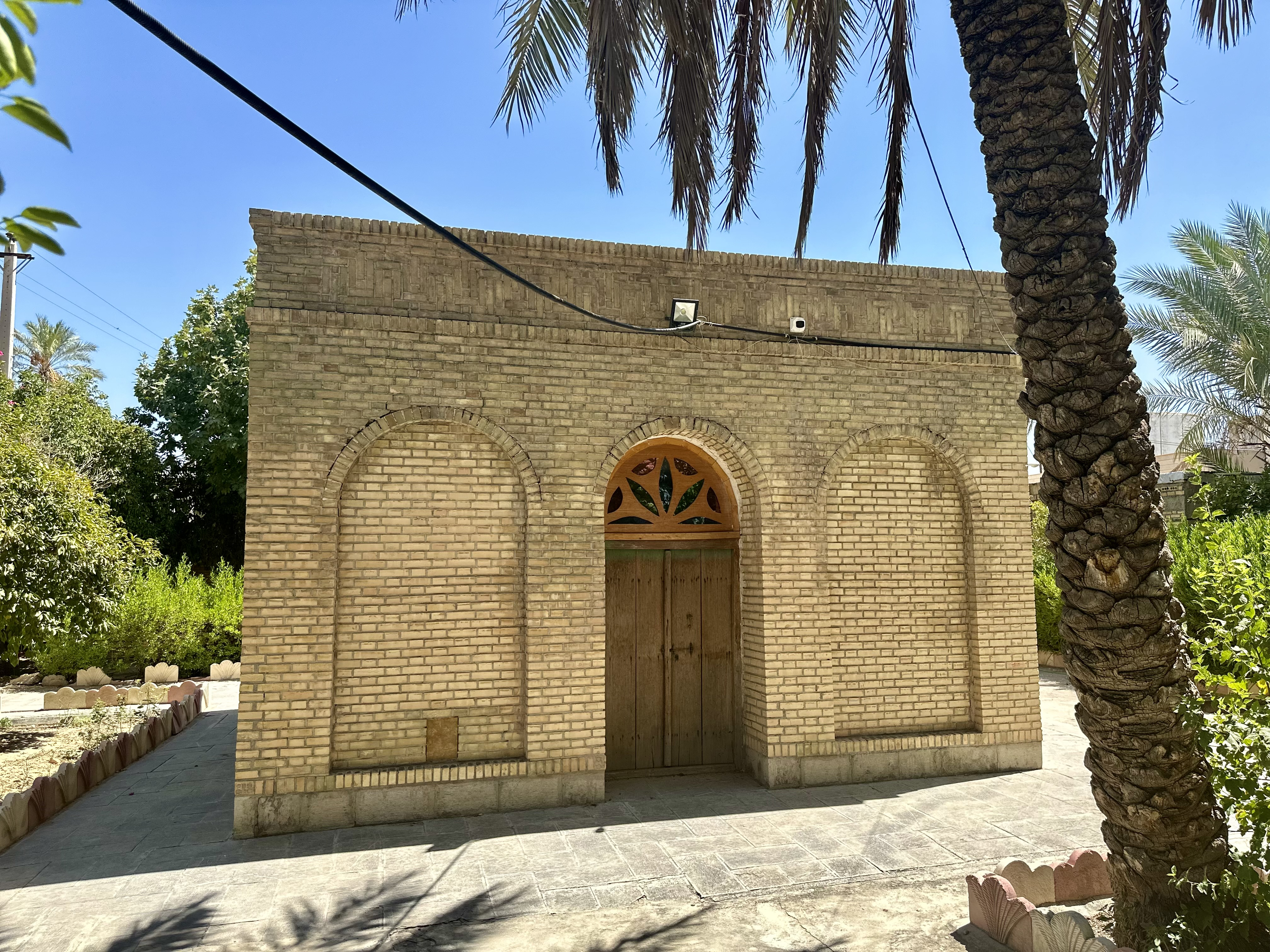
- Tomb of Abū Ishaq of Kazerun

Mystic Poet, Sufi Master
- Born: 12 October 963; Kazerun, Buyid dynasty
- Died: 20 September 1035 (aged 71); Kazerun, Buyid dynasty
- Resting place: Ivan-e Morshedi, Kazerun, Iran
- Venerated in: Traditional Islam, and especially by Sufi (in Iran, India, China and Ottoman Empire)
- Influences: Ibn Khafif
- Influenced: Khwaju Kermani, Amin al-Din Balyani, Attar of Nishapur, Ruzbihan Baqli, Kings of Iran, Kings of India, Ottoman emperors and many other later Sufi Poets
- Tradition or genre: Mystic poetry
- Major works: Establishing the Kazeruniyeh (Morshediyeh) sufism

Ibrāhīm bin Shahryar bin Zadan Farrokh bin Khorshid (Persian: ابراهیم بن شهریار بن زادان‌فرخ بن خورشید; c. 963 – c. 1035), better known by his pen-names Abū Ishaq (ابواسحاق) and Sheykh Abū Ishaq of Kazerun (شیخ ابواسحاق کازرونی) and Nicknamed Sheykh Murshid (شیخ مرشد), was a famous Iraninan Sufi of the late 4th and early 5th century AH. He was the founder of the Kazeruniyeh sufism, which spread eastwards to India and China, and westwards to Anatolia and Baghdad.

== Birth and family ==
Abū Ishaq Ibrāhīm was born on the 15th of Ramadan in the year 352 AH equal to 963 AD in Novard area of Kazerun (currently Olia neighborhood). His father, Shahryar, was a craftsman from the Salmani dynasty of Kazerun, who were relatives of Salman the Persian, and the Prophet of Islam had exempted them from paying the Jizya. Shahryar and Banouye (his mother), who were born in Zoroastrian families, changed their religion and became Muslims before the birth of Abū Ishaq.

== The era of Abū Ishaq ==
At the time of Abū Ishaq's birth, the Fars region was still one of the important bases of the Zoroastrian religion, and Kazerun was the most important and largest center of Zoroastrianism, and most of the people of Kazerun still had the Zoroastrian religion. At that time, there were several large Fire temples and two Mosques in Kazerun, and the ruler of the city was a Zoroastrian named Khorshid Marzban, known as Deylam Majoosi, who belonged to the Zoroastrians of Buyid dynasty.

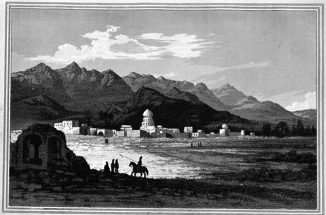
The remains of a fire temple in Kazerun, while a view of a mosque is also visible in the background (painting by Lt. Johnson in 1818)

== Life and education ==
Abū Ishaq was born in a poor family and had to work since childhood. In the mornings, before starting work, he used to study Quran with Abū Tamam from Basra and Abū Ali Muhammad from Levant, who were Quran reciters living in Kazerun. He gradually became an admirer of Ibn Khafif, a famous Sufi of the 4th century AH. Among his main teachers, we can mention Abū Abdullah Muhammad Beyzavi, Abi Ahmed Abdul Vahab Ramin, Judge Abu al-Tayyib al-Tabari, Abū Abdullah Muhammad Kazeruni and Judge Abū Masoud Mohsen Kazeruni. Abū Ishaq traveled to Basra, Mecca and Medina with Sheykh Hassan Akkar in 388 AH. Finally, after completing his studies, he founded the Kazeruniyeh (Morshediyeh) sufism in the second half of the 4th century AH with the aim of promoting Islam, centered in the city of Kazerun.

== Efforts to spread Islam and battles ==
Abū Ishaq decided to develop Islam in Kazerun region and for this reason he started to spread the religion. He first went to the pulpit in the Congregational mosque of Kazerun. But due to the disruptions caused by the opponents in his work, he had to leave Kazerun and propagated religion by building an altar and then a stone mosque in the outskirts of the city. His opponents destroyed this mosque many times until finally, in 371 AH, one of his disciples built a mosque that became the main base of the Kazeruniyeh sufism. It was after that that Abu Ishaq turned to preparing an army with the help of Abū Abdullah Muhammad bin Jazin. The conflicts between Abū Ishaq and the Zoroastrian ruler of Kazerun caused a fierce war between Muslims and Zoroastrians of Kazerun. His numerous wars caused him to be called Sheykh-e Ghazi (means Warrior) among the people. The hostilities continued until a man named Shahzur bin Kharbam tried to assassinate Sheykh Abū Ishaq, which was unsuccessful. Finally, the ruler of Kazerun was poisoned by one of Sheykh Abū Ishaq's disciples in 406 AH and died. All the events led to the consolidation and expansion of Islam in Kazerun. Narrations indicate that 24,000 Zoroastrians and Jews of Kazerun were converted to Islam by Sheykh Abū Ishaq. The activities of the Kazeruniyeh sufism led by Sheykh Abū Ishaq reached such a level that it gradually established 65 Sufi lodge in the Fars region.

== Death ==
Sheykh Abū Ishaq died on the 8th of Dhu Qadah in the year 426 AH equal to 1035 AD after enduring illness for four months in Kazerun. Throughout his life, he was always a vegetarian and never married.

== Famous disciples and enthusiasts ==
Sheykh Abū Ishaq had many disciples, and Mahmoud bin Othman gave a long list of their names in his biography's book. Among the famous disciples of Abū Ishaq during his lifetime, we can mention Amir Abulfazl bin Buyeh Deylami and Fakhr al-Mulk, the ministers of Buyid dynasty. Shah Rukh, the king of the Timurid Empire in the 9th century AH, Ghiyas ud din Balban, sultan of Mamluk dynasty in delhi in the 7th century AH, Alauddin Khalji, ruler of the Delhi Sultanate in the 7th and 8th centuries, and Muhammad bin Tughluq, the sultan of Delhi in the 8th century AH were among his other famous disciples. Bayezid the Thunderbolt and Mehmed the Conqueror, Sultans of Ottoman Empire, also had a special devotion to Sheykh Abū Ishaq of Kazerun and built buildings for him in Ottoman. Mahmoud Shah Inju, the ruler of the Injuids in Fars and Isfahan, named his son and successor Abū Ishaq because of his devotion to Sheykh Abū Ishaq. Among his famous disciples and admirers in later centuries, we can mention Khwaju Kermani, Amin al-Din Balyani, Attar of Nishapur, Ruzbihan Baqli, Khajeh Amin al-Din Kazeruni and Rokn al-Din Danyal Khonji. The kings of India had great faith in Sheykh Abū Ishaq and paid many vows in his name. Local rulers in Iran also used his name on coins, especially from the 7th century A.H. onwards.

== The book of Abū Ishaq's biography ==
Ferdows al-Murshidiya fi Asrar al-Samadiyya is the name of the book of the biography of Sheykh Abū Ishaq of Kazerun, which was written in the fifth century AH by Imam Abū Bakr Muhammad and translated in the eighth century AH by Mahmoud bin Othman, one of his disciples.

== Works ==
Among the remaining works of Sheykh Abū Ishaq, we can mention narrations about beliefs, testament-like words addressed to Abulfath Abd al-Salam bin Ahmad and poems in the Old Kazeruni dialect, which today is considered one of the dead dialects.

== Expansion of the Kazeruniyeh sufism ==
After the death of Sheykh Abū Ishaq, the activities of the Kazeruniyeh sufism continued through its Sufi lodges, which were known as philanthropic enterprises, under the leadership of the Kazerun sufi lodge. The location of the Fars region and the city of Kazerun as part of the commercial highway on the back shore of the Persian Gulf and the existence of the merchant network from Kazerun city, led to the expansion of the Kazeruniyeh sufism. Hasan Fasa'i writes about this in his book Fars-Nama-ye Naseri:

The number of merchants of Kazerun is so large that this book (Fars-Nama) cannot contain it.

Sheykh Abū Ishaq's successors in the leadership of the Kazeruniyeh sufism built most of their sufi lodges on commercial routes. Their activity was initially limited to Shapur-Khwarrah state. The city of Bishapur, as one of the capitals of the Sasanian Empire and the most important city of this state, had gradually transferred its position and importance to Kazerun, and most of the people of Bishapur had also migrated to Kazerun. Other important cities of this state include the ancient cities of Tawwaj and Ghondejan both of which are abandoned today. The city of Khonj, one of the backshore cities of the Persian Gulf, was also one of the areas where the Kazeruniyeh sufi lodge was established in the early stages due to its location on the trade route. Being on the important trade routes gradually made the merchants of Kazeruniyeh sufism with the countries of the East and the West and made them rich. The presence of merchants of Kazerun in these countries led to the creation of an international network by the Kazeruniyeh sufism in other countries, especially China, India and Anatolia. The leadership of this international network was under the responsibility of Sheykh Omar bin Abul Faraj of Kazerun, the head of the Kazeruniyeh sufism and the successor of Sheykh Abū Ishaq of Kazerun. Ibn Battuta has mentioned in the book Rihla about the existence of Kazeruniyeh (Murshidyeh) sufi lodges in China and India.

== Method of the Kazeruniyeh sufism ==
The method of Kazeruniyeh sufism was based on the principle that one should take from the rich and give to the poor. The followers of this sufism also propagated Islam by doing charity work in different countries. Kazeruniyeh sufi lodges were considered a place to collect offerings and welcome travelers and the poor. In these sufi lodges, remittances were given to the poor and the needy, and they could receive these remittances through those who paid their alms to the sufi lodges of Kazeruniyeh. Ibn Battuta narrates that:

Once a dervish was sent to India to collect the ten thousand dinars that the King of India, Muhammad bin Tughluq, had vowed to Sheykh Abū Ishaq.

== Influence of Kazeruniyeh sufism in India ==
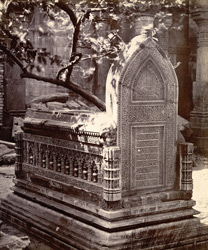
Tomb of Umar of Kazerun in Kambaye

India, as one of the commercial and population centers, was the focus of Sheykh Abū Ishaq and the elders of the Kazeruniyeh sufism from the very beginning. The first Sufi who migrated to India was Sheykh Safi al-Din of Kazerun, the nephew and disciple of Sheykh Abū Ishaq, who went to this region on his orders and founded the Kazeruniyeh sufi lodge in the city of Uch (located in the present-day Punjab state of Pakistan). However, the influence of the Kazeruniyeh sufism in India increased from the last years of the 7th century AH with the arrival of the followers of this sufism and merchants of Kazerun city to India. The fame and influence of Sheykh Abū Ishaq of Kazerun in India reached such an extent that Alauddin Khalji, the king of the Khalji dynasty in India, after capturing the port of Kambaye (present-day Khambhat), built an altar there and wrote verses of the Quran around it and sent it to the tomb of Sheykh Abū Ishaq in Kazerun as a blessing. Muhammad bin Tughluq, the sultan of Delhi in the 8th century AH, was so devoted to Kazeruniyeh sufism that he granted the city of Kambaye to Umar of Kazerun, one of the Sufis of the Kazeruniyeh sufism in India, and after Umar's death in 734 AH, he built a magnificent tomb for him. Ibn Battuta, who traveled to India in 734 AH, mentions the activities of the Kazeruniyeh sufism sufi lodges in the ports of Calicut and Kollam on the Malabar coast. Unions of Iranian merchants were active in western India under the leadership of Sheykh Shahab al-Din of Kazerun, known as Malik al-Tojjar. At the same time, Sheikh Shahab al-Din was the head of the Kazeruniyeh sufi lodge in the port of Calicut and the representative of the Kazeruniyeh sufism to receive the offerings of the people of India and China and collect the offerings of merchants and sailors for the central sufi lodge of the Kazeruniyeh sufism in the city of Kazerun. His son, Sheykh Fakhr al-Din of Kazerun, was also the head of the Kazeruniyeh sufi lodge in Kollam port and held the same position in South India. Among other influential disciples of Sheykh Abū Ishaq of Kazerun in India, we can mention Sheykh Nur al-Din Malik Yar Paran and Rafi al-Din of Kazerun, both of whom were close to the Indian court in the 7th century AH and were engaged in the work of judges in this country.

== Influence of Kazeruniyeh sufism in China ==
In the 8th century AH, the presence of Muslim merchants, including merchants of Kazerun, increased in the city of Guangzhou in China, and their financial power and cultural influence made them gain power in this country. One of these influential people was Burhan al-Din of Kazerun, a Sufi and the head of the Kazeruniyeh sufi lodge in China. He also received the offerings of merchants and sailors and sent them to the central sufi lodge in Kazerun city. In his travelogue, Ibn Battuta mentions Sheykh Burhan al-Din of Kazerun as one of the great sufis living in Guangzhou. In his travelogue, Ibn Battuta has also mentioned that Sheykh Abū Ishaq of Kazerun has a high position in the eyes of the people of India and China, and ships coming from India or China pay thousands of dinars as offerings to the representatives of Sheykh Abū Ishaq to protect them from calamities.

== Influence of Kazeruniyeh sufism in Anatolia ==
According to tradition, Sheykh Abū Ishaq sent his disciples into Anatolia to fight the Christians, although there is no contemporary evidence for the presence of his sect there until the 14th century. Nevertheless, his teachings became influential amongst Turkomans as a spiritual foundation for their ghazi mentality and their militant jihad.

He had many fans and disciples in the Ottoman Empire, so that there is a neighborhood named Abū Ishaq in the city of Bursa, the empire's first capital. The name of this neighborhood is due to the presence of a mosque and a symbolic tomb of Sheykh Abū Ishaq of Kazerun. In the year 802 AH, Sultan Bayezid Osmani built the symbolic tomb of Sheykh Abū Ishaq for the followers of the Kazeruniyeh sufism, which was known as Ishaqiyeh in that region. In later periods, Sultan Mehmed the Conqueror rebuilt it. This building is still standing and is kept as one of the cultural heritage of Turkey.

== Tomb ==
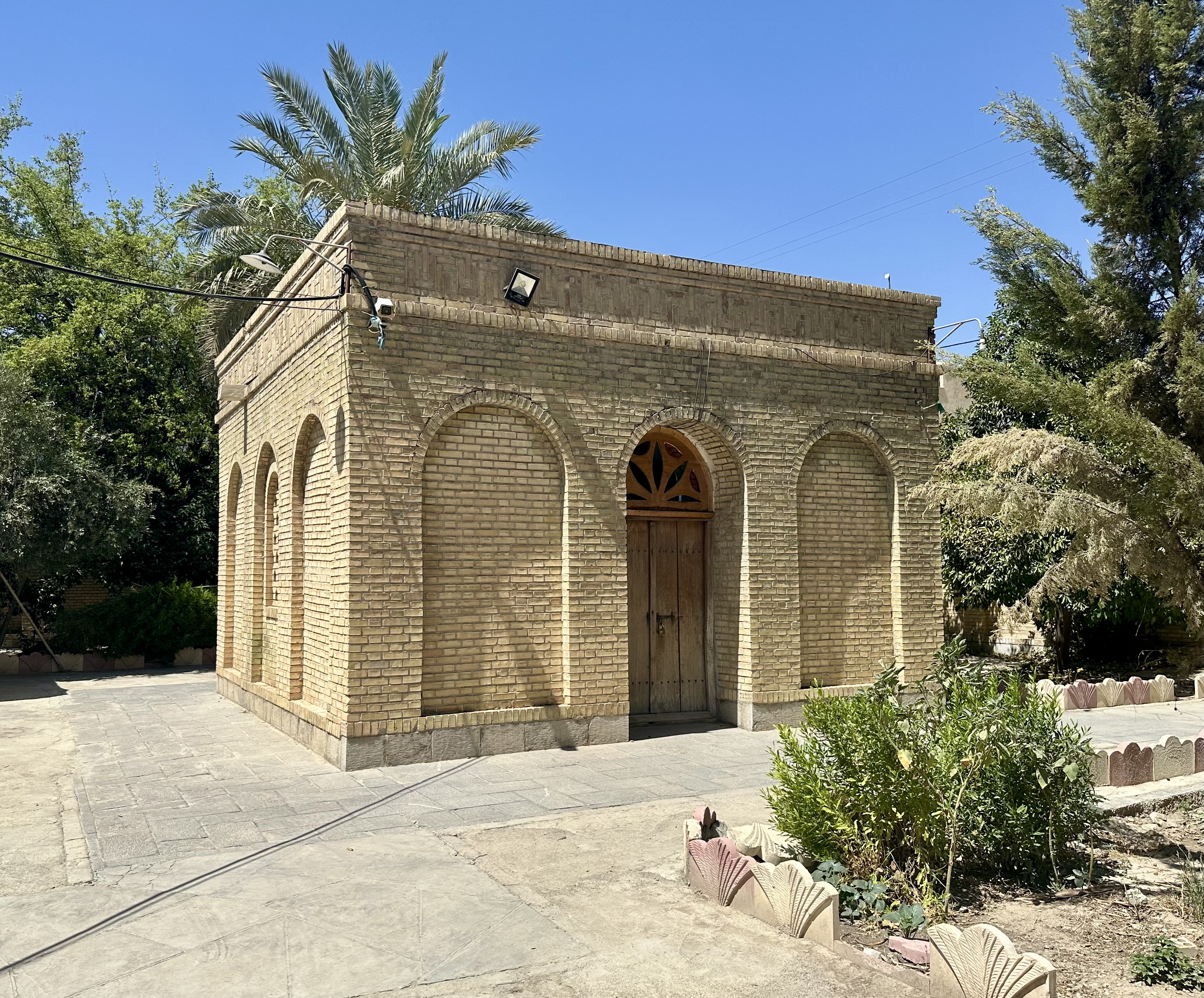
Tomb of Abū Ishaq of Kazerun

After his death in 426 AH, Sheykh Abū Ishaq of Kazerun was buried in his sufi lodge, known as Ivan-e Morshedi, which is located in Kuzehgaran neighborhood of Kazerun today. This place has seen many historical events. The soil of Sheykh Abū Ishaq's grave was used to bless pilgrims going from Konya to Hijaz and also to prevent ships from sinking. The people believed in her tomb to such an extent that the soil of her tomb was called the great opium. Sheykh Abū Ishaq had bequeathed as follows:

Whenever an accident happens to you, attack my grave so that the disaster will be removed.

The same thing happened and Seljuq Shah bin Salghor, Atabeg of Fars, who had revolted against the Mongols who ruled Iran, took refuge in the tomb of Sheykh Abū Ishaq in Kazerun and made that place a stronghold against the Mongols. But in the end, he was badly defeated by the Mongols. In this war, Seljuq Shah was captured and killed, and the Mongols also massacred the people of Kazerun who had sheltered Seljuq Shah. Whenever Shah Rukh, the king of the Timurid Empire traveled to the south of Iran, he came to visit the tomb of Sheykh Abū Ishaq. This tomb is the place where Khwaju Kermani sang the Mathnawi of Rozat al-Anwar during his stay in Kazerun in the year 743 AH. The tomb of Sheykh Abū Ishaq of Kazerun was registered in the Iran National Heritage List in 1978 with number 1509. The garden where the tomb of Sheykh Abū Ishaq is located is currently the location of the Cultural Heritage, Tourism and Handicrafts Department of Kazerun.

== Destruction of the Kazeruniyeh sufism ==
Finally, with the coming to power of the Safavid dynasty, Shah Ismail I ordered the killing of the elders of the Kazeruniyeh sufism and the destruction of their important buildings. This sufism was also deprived of having a central sufi lodge and gradually declined.

== Resources ==
- Abu Ishaq from Kazerun (Persian Wikipedia)
- Encyclopedia Iranica - ABŪ ESḤĀQ KĀZARŪNĪ
- Encyclopedia Iranica - KĀZARUNIYA
- Encyclopedia Iranica - FERDAWS AL-MORŠEDĪYA FĪ ASRĀR AL-ṢAMADĪYA
- Azam Rahimi Jaberi, The Role of Sheikh Abu Eshaq Kazerouni in the Expansion of Islam in Kazeroun (Second Half of the Fourth Century to the Early Fifth Century AH)
- Information about Sheikh Abu Ishaq Kazeruni Mausoleum
- Isamveri
- Abdolrasool Kheirandish, Azam Rahimi Jaberi, The Development of Morshediyeh Monastery in Hind and China during the Eighth Century
- Encyclopedia Iranica - KAZERUN ii. History
- Ralph Kauz, Aspects of the Maritime Silk Road:From the Persian Gulf to the East China Sea - A Kazaruni Network section
- Elizabeth Lambourn, A collection of merits…’ architectural influences in the Friday mosque and Kazaruni tomb complex at Cambay in Gujarat
- Abdurrahman Mihcloglu, Academia Edu - Şeyh-i Gâzî Ebû İshâk Kâzerûnî | Shaykh Abu Ishaq al-Kazeruni
- The tomb of Abu Ishaq Kazeruni
- Abdolrasool Kheirandish, Azam Rahimi Jaberi, The formation and expansion of Murshidiya monasteries in India and China
- Fatemeh Erfani Vahed, Abdollah Vasegh Abbasi, Mohammad Amir Mashhadi, Morshidiya and its reflection in the subcontinent
- Wikifeqh - Abu Ishaq Ibrahim bin Shahryar Kazeruni
- Wiki Ahlolbait - Sheykh Abu Ishaq Kazeruni
- Tazkirat al-Awliya of Attar of Nishapur - Mention of Sheykh Abu Ishaq Shahryar of Kazerun
- Tahoor Encyclopedia - Abu Ishaq Kazeruni
- Biography of Sheikh Abu Ishaq Kazeruni
- Seyed Ali Asghar Mirbagheri-fard, Zohreh Najafi, Amirhossein Koohestani, Analyzing and examining the mystical ethics of Sheykh Abu Ishaq of Kazerun
- Mohammad Sheikholhokamaei, The position of the dignity of Sheykh Abu Ishaq of Kazerun in the expansion of the monasteries of Murshidiya
- Sun of Kazerun, A research on the status and thoughts of Abu Ishaq Kazeruni, Elyas Nooraei, 2012, Yar-e Danesh Publications
