= Balyan =

Balyan may refer to:

- Balyan family, an Armenian family of Ottoman court architects
- Balyan (surname), an Indian surname
- Balyan Rural District, in Fars province of Iran
- Balyan, Iran, a village in Balyan Rural District
- Balyan, shamans in the Philippines
