= Ohadi Balyani =

Ohadi Balyani (Persian: اوحدی بلیانی; 1565 – 1640) was a poet, biographer, and lexicographer in 16th and 17th century Safavid Iran. He came from the distinguished Balyani family, some of whom became renowned as Saadi Shirazi and Hafez's associates in previous centuries, including Sheikh Abdullah Balyani and Amin al-Din Balyani.

== Sources ==
- Davud, Seyyed Ali Al-i (2019). "اوحدی بلیانی". The Great Islamic Encyclopaedia (in Persian).
