= Amin al-Din Balyani =

Amīn al-Din Balyānī
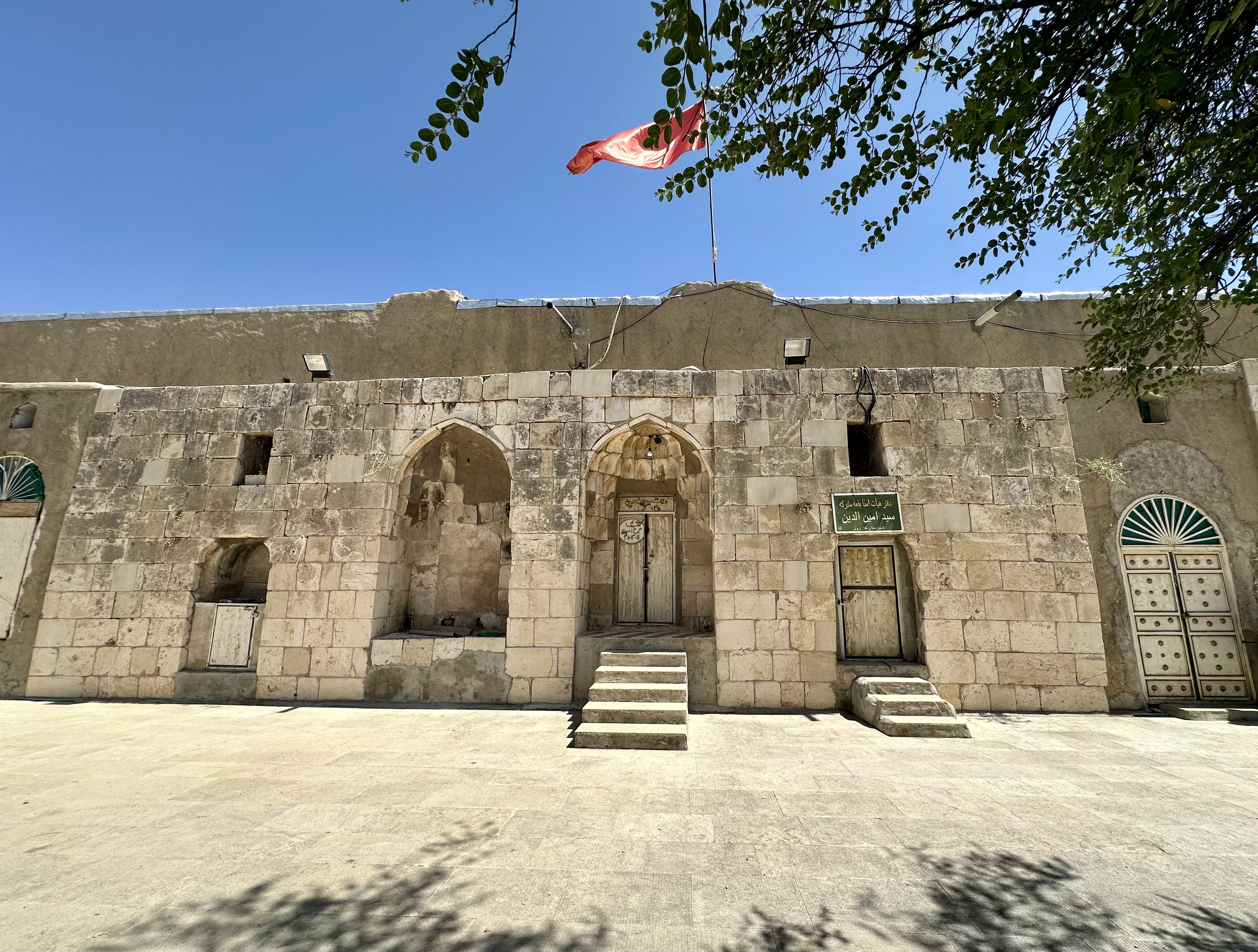
- Tomb of Amīn al-Din in Kazerun

Mystic Poet, Sufi
- Born: c. 1269; Balyan, Kazerun, Ilkhanate
- Died: c. 1345 (aged 75–76); Kazerun, Injuids
- Resting place: Khānqāh-e Olīā, Kazerun, Iran
- Venerated in: Traditional Islam, and especially by Sufi
- Influences: Abu al-Najib Suhrawardi, Abu Ishaq of Kazerun
- Influenced: Hafez, Khwaju Kermani, Zarkub Shirazi, Mahmud bin Othman, Abu Ishaq Inju
- Tradition or genre: Mystic poetry
- Major works: Shaykh al-Islām of Fars

Amīn al-Dīn Mohammad bin Ali bin Masūd Balyānī Kāzerūnī (c. 1269 – c. 1345; Persian: امین‌الدین محمد بن علی بن مسعود بلیانی کازرونی) better known by his pen-names Amīn al-Din (امین‌الدین) and Sheykh Amīn al-Din Balyani (شیخ امین‌الدین بلیانی) was Sufi, mystic and poet of the 7th and 8th centuries AH. Also, according to some narrations, he was Shaykh al-Islām of Fars during the rule of Injuids. Amin al-Din was one of mystics of Suhrawardiyya order and one of the devotees of Abu Ishaq of Kazerun.

== Birth and Family ==
Amīn al-Din Mohammad was born in the year 1269 in the village of Balyan, which is located 6 kilometers from the city of Kazerun today. His father's name was Zain al-Din Alī, who was one of the Sufis of Kazerun and a descendant of Abū Alī Daqāq. His mother was also the daughter of the Zāhed Ezzollah Kazeruni, who was considered one of the mystics of Kazerun. His uncle Sheykh Abdollāh Balyani was one of the famous Sufis of the 7th century AH and the founder of the Balyaniyeh order, whose daughter Amin al-Din married, Bībī Nosrat Khātūn. His brother was named Imam al-Din Mohammad, who succeeded him after the death of Amin al-Din. Amin al-Din had a son named Moheb al-Din Mohammad. Saeed al-Din Kazeruni, his cousin, is also one of the famous biographers.

== Study ==
Amin al-Din learned the Quran from Shaykh al-Islām Nur al-Din at a young age and then studied under Abu Saeed. He learned the basics of science from his father, Fiqh from Othman Kahafi and Hadith sciences from Rashid al-Din Ahmad Kazeruni. Among his other teachers was his uncle, Sheykh Abdollah Balyani. Apparently, he had also traveled to other regions to study. Although Amin al-Din was a special devotee of Sheykh Abu Ishaq of Kazerun and the Kazeruniyeh order and built many buildings in his name in Kazerun, he was considered one of the mystics of the Suhrawardiyya order.

== Students ==
Sheykh Amin al-Din Balyani trained many students, the most famous of whom is Mahmud bin Othman, the author of the two famous books Ferdows al-Morshediyeh fi Asrar al-Samadiyeh and Meftah al-Hedayat va Mesbah al-Enayat, Zarkub Shirazi, author of Shiraznameh, who also wrote a book about poems of Sheykh Amin al-Din, and Saeed al-Din Balyani Kazeruni, Amin al-Din's cousin and the famous biographer of the Prophet of Islam pointed out.

== Disciples and enthusiasts ==
Among the disciples of Amin al-Din, we can mention Hafez, a famous Iranian poet, who praised Sheikh Amin al-Din in a verse. Among his main disciples, we can mention Mahmoud bin Othman, who discussed Amin al-Din's life and biography in the book Meftah al-Hedayat va Mesbah al-Enayat. Khwaju Kermani also praised him as his elder in his poems and wrote poems in praise of Amin al-Din. Other famous disciples of Amin al-Din include Zarkub Shirazi, Sheykh Shams al-Din Mohammad Sediq and Seyyed Nosrat al-Din Ali bin Jafar Hasani. Sharaf al-Din Mahmud Shah Injo, the ruler of Fars, and his son Jalal al-Din Masud Shah Injo were also disciples of Amin al-Din. Abu Ishaq Inju, the ruler of Injuid dynasty, was also one of the disciples of Amin al-Din.

== Order ==
Amin al-Din Balyani had special devotion and respect for Abu Ishaq of Kazerun, a famous Sufi and the founder of the Kazeruniyeh order, and built many buildings named after him in the city of Kazerun and its surroundings, and wrote many poems in praise of him. For this reason, some have considered him to be one of the mystics of the Kazeruniyeh (Morshediyeh) order. However, reliable sources state that he, like his uncle, Sheykh Abdollah Balyani, was one of the followers of the Suhrawardiyya order.

== Services ==
Amin al-Din built a Sufi lodge in the north of Kazerun and started teaching there. He also built several buildings for the welfare, education and health of the people in Kazerun, including the Dar al-Hadis Shamsiyeh school, Qarcheh Qanat, and Bemeshq (Bidmeshk) fountain (which is considered one of the tourist attractions of Kazerun today), pointed out. Amin al-Din also built buildings in memory of Sheykh Abu Ishaq of Kazerun, among which we can mention Saqayeh Morshedi (water tank), Dar al-Shafa Morshedi (Hospital), and Dar al-Abedin Morshedi, which was a place for travelers. The expansion of Morahedi Congregational mosque is also one of his actions.

== Position ==
Amin al-Din was noticed and respected by the rulers of Fars, especially the Injuid, and he had close relations with them, as some of the nobles of Fars were among his disciples. Amīn Rāzī, the Safavid era writer, referring to Hafez's poet, who mentioned Amin al-Din as Baqiyeh Ebdal (Persian: بقیهٔ ابدال), considered him the Shaykh al-Islām of Fars during the reign of Abu Ishaq Inju.

== Works ==
Among his works is Diwan of poems written in the margin of a manuscript of Kolliate Saadi, in which the Sheikh used the surname Amin and sometimes Amin Balyani. Badayat al-Zakerin, Tarbiat-Nameha, Jame al-Daavat le ahl al-Khalavat and Waqfnameh are also his other works.

== Death and mausoleum ==
Images

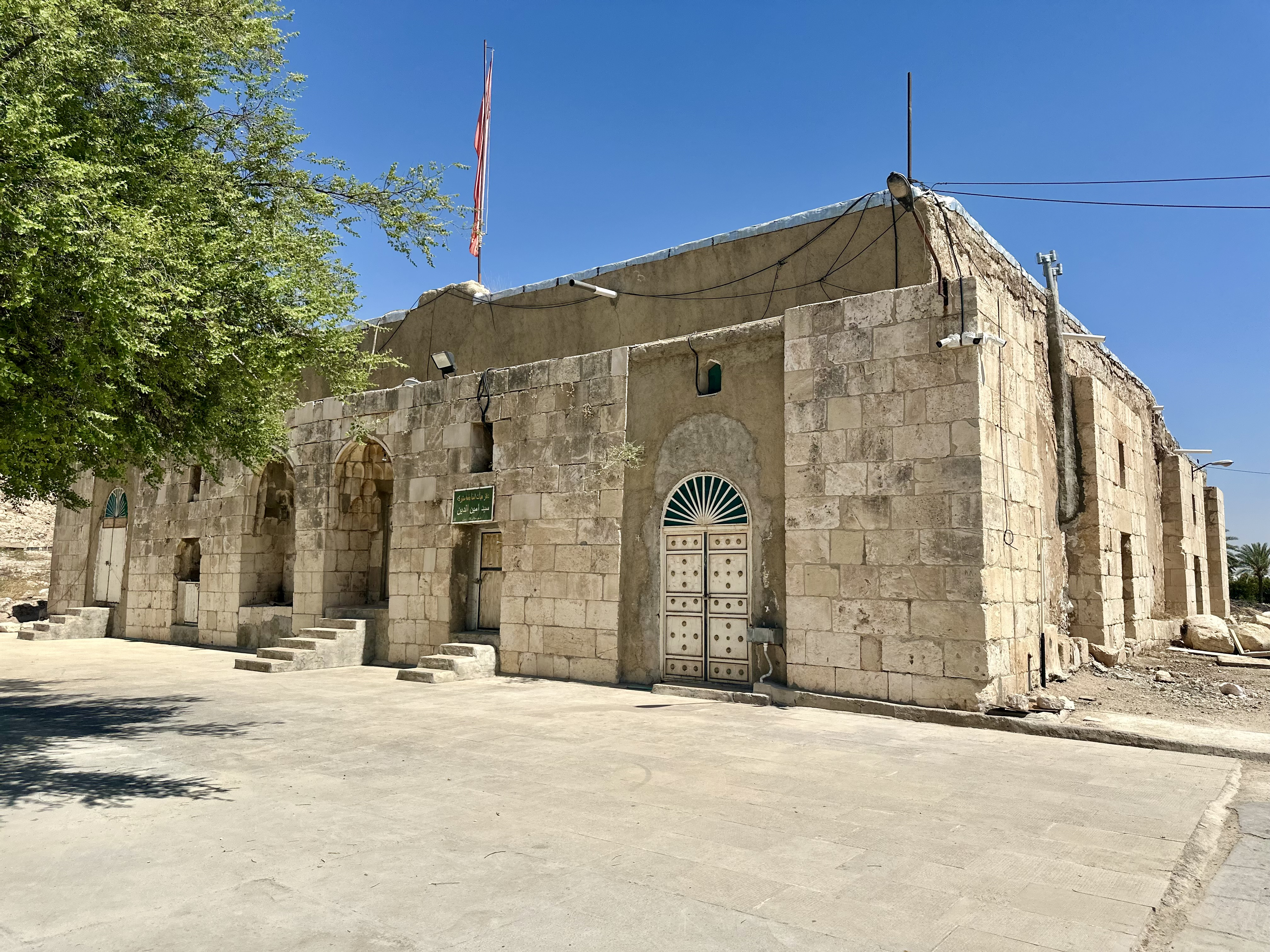
A view from the mausoleum of Amin al-Din, located in the north of the city of Kazerun

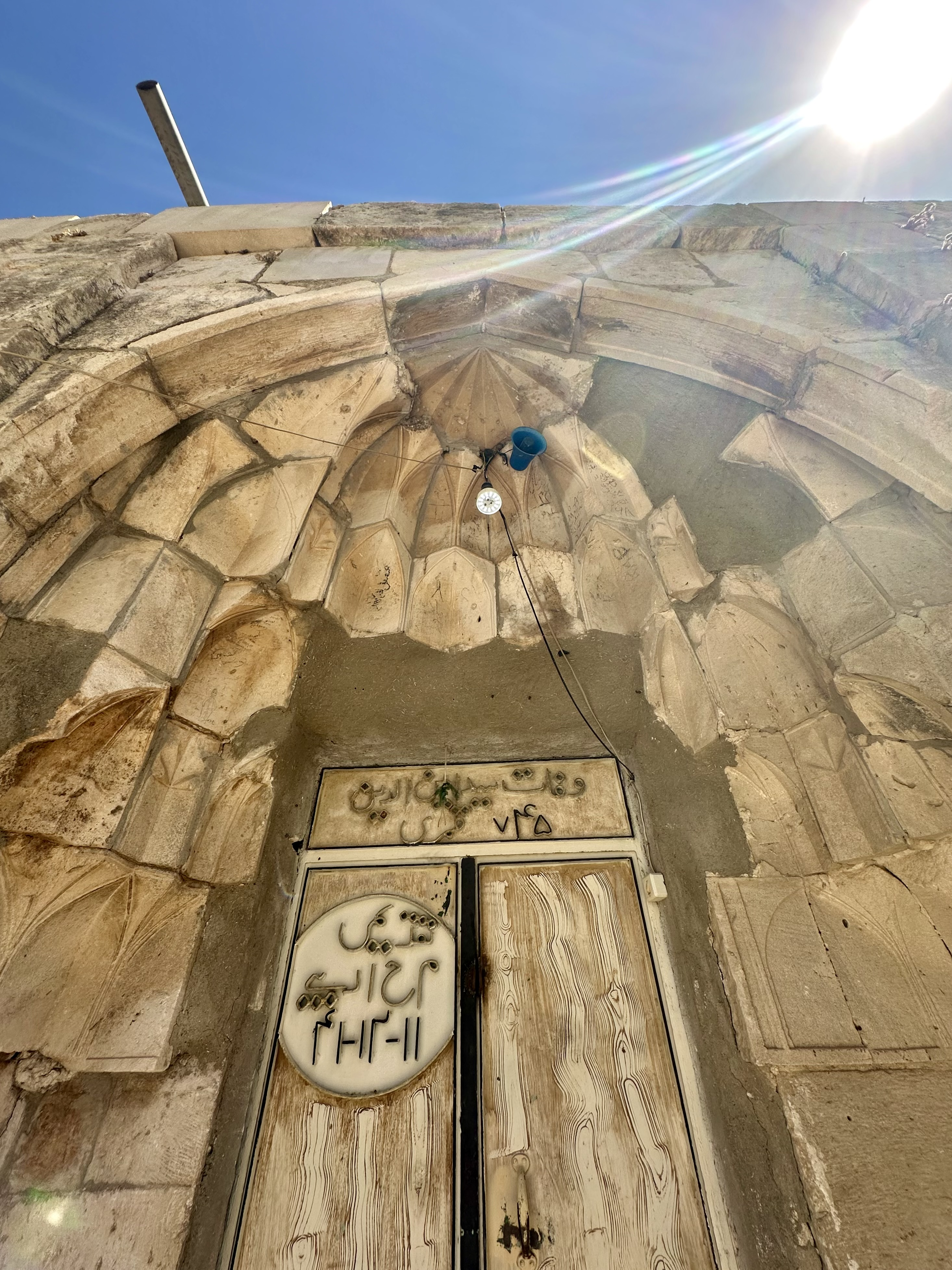
Stone Muqarnas at the entrance of Amin al-Din's mausoleum

Amin al-Din Balyani died on 24 March of 1345 in Kazerun and was buried in his Sufi lodge known as Khanqah-e Olia. This building was destroyed in the severe earthquake of 1823 and was rebuilt again. The architecture of this mausoleum is very similar to the temple of Anahita located in the ancient city of Bishapur. The stone moqrans at the entrance of this tomb is one of the rare examples of stone Muqarnas in the history of Iranian architecture. This building was registered in the national register in 1978.

== Sources ==
- Aigle, Denise (2015). "BALYĀNI, AMIN-AL-DIN". In Yarshater, Ehsan (ed.). Encyclopædia Iranica (Online ed.). Encyclopædia Iranica Foundation.
- Mirbagherifard, Sayyed Aliasghar; Kouhestani, Amirhosein. "Review and Analysis of the Mystical Path of Sheikh Amin al-Din Balyani" (PDF). Research on Mystical Literature.
