= Fars-Nama-ye Naseri =

Historical Literature

Fars-Nama-ye Naseri (Persian: فارسنامه ناصری, lit. 'The Naseri Book of Fars') is a Persian language book on the geography and history of Fars province in Iran. It was written by Hasan Fasa'i (1821–1898) by the order of Naser al-Din Shah Qajar and features illustrations and maps. Its volume two also covers the climate of the province, its vegetation, agriculture and fauna, cartography, and its position based on longitude and latitude.
