= Hasan Fasa'i =

Iranian writer (1821–1898)

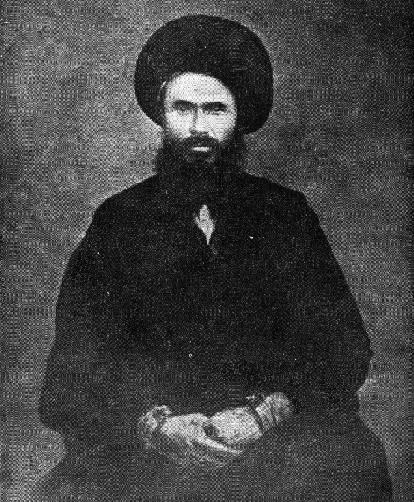
Picture of Hasan Fasa'i

Hasan Fasa'i (Persian: حسن فسایی; 1821 – 26 November 1898) was an Iranian writer who authored Fars-Nama-ye Naseri. He was born in Fasa and died in Shiraz, both in modern-day Fars province.

== Sources ==
- Busse, Heribert; Ashraf, Ahmad; Banuazizi, Ali (1999). "Fārs-nāma-ye nāṣerī". In Yarshater, Ehsan (ed.). Encyclopædia Iranica. Vol. IX/4: Fārs II–Fauna III. London and New York: Routledge & Kegan Paul. pp. 374–378. ISBN 978-0-933273-32-0.
- Idem, "Merchants of Shiraz in the Late 19th Century", a monograph prepared at the Center for Middle Eastern Studies, Harvard University, 1987.
- A. Banuazizi and A. Ashraf, "The Urban Elite and Notables of Shiraz in the Late Nineteenth Century", paper presented at the 11th Annual Meeting of the Middle East Studies Association, New York, November 1977.
- Fasāʾī, tr. Busse. D. Demorgny, "Les réformes administratives en Perse: Les tribus du Fars", RMM 22, 1913, pp. 85–150; 23, 1913, pp. 3–108 (based entirely on Fasāʾī's work).
- D. A. Lane, "Hajjī Mīrzā Ḥasan-i Shīrāzī on the Nomadic Tribes of Fārs in the Fārs-nāmeh-i Nāṣirī", JRAS, 1923, pp. 209–31.
