= Temple of Anahita, Bishapur =

UNESCO world heritage site in Iran

Temple of Anahita
- 𐭠𐭭𐭠𐭤𐭩𐭲𐭠𐭬𐭠𐭡𐭣 (Classical Syriac) معبد آناهیتا (Persian)
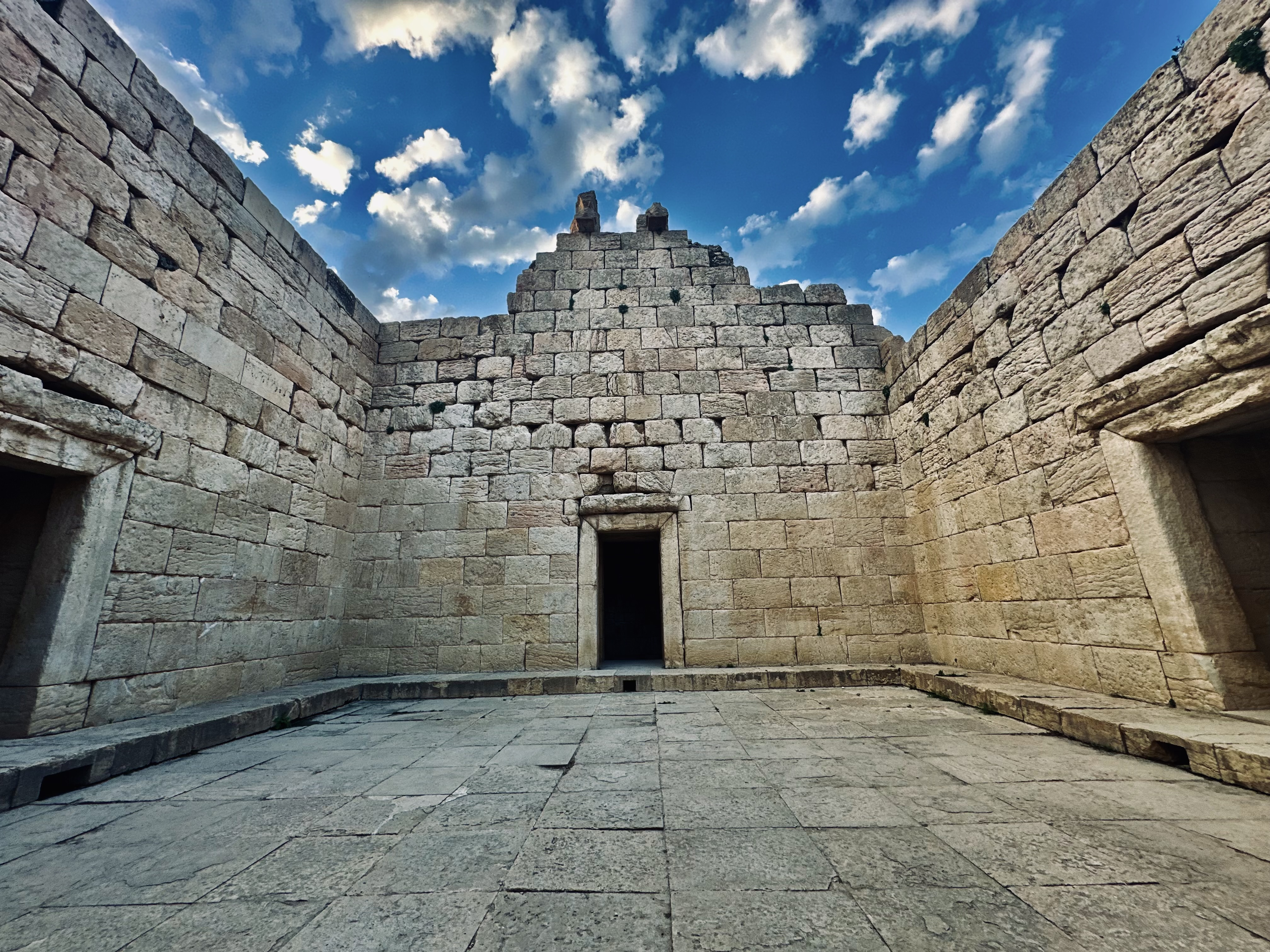
- Temple of Anahita in Bishapur

- Location within Iran Location within West and Central Asia
- 29.780°N 51.575°E
- Type: Temple
- Periods: Sasanian Empire
- Cultures: Persian
- Location: Kazerun, Fars province, Iran

History
- Built: 3rd century AD
- Built by: Shapur I
- Abandoned: 1101 AD

Site notes
- Material: Limestone, Metal
- Architectural style: Achaemenid
- Condition: Ruins
- Management: Cultural Heritage, Handicrafts and Tourism Organization of Iran
- Public access: Open
- Website: salfbase.ir

UNESCO World Heritage Site
- Official name: Sassanid Archaeological Landscape of Fars Region
- Type: Cultural
- Criteria: ii, iii, vi
- Designated: 2018 (42nd session)
- Reference no.: 1568
- Region: Asia-Pacific

The Temple of Anahita or the Shrine of Anahita (Middle Persian: Ādur-Anāhīd) is one of the famous monuments of the ancient city of Bishapur, located near the city of Kazerun.

The temple was built in the 3rd century AD by the order of the Sasanian king Shapur I. It was registered in 1310 SH (Note: 1931-1932 in the Gregorian calendar) as one of the first national monuments of Iran. It is also listed as part of the Bishapur complex in the UNESCO World Heritage List.

== Location ==
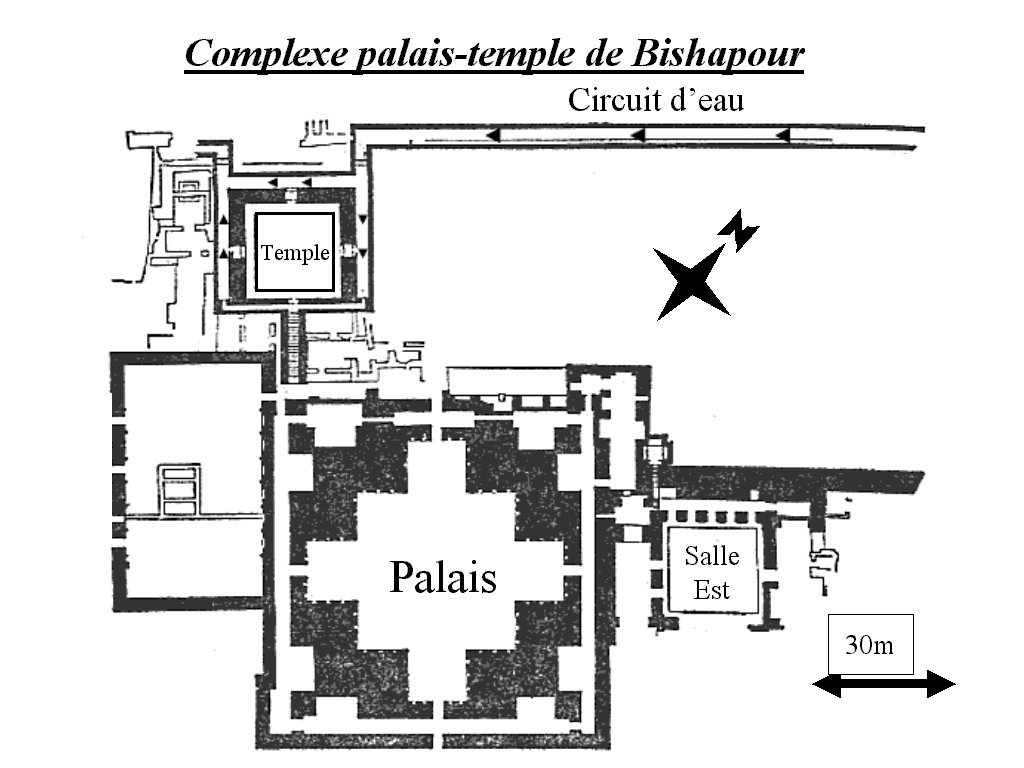
Plan of the royal citadel of Bishapur, the Anahita Temple is located in the northwest part of the map.

The Temple of Anahita is located near the Royal palace of Shapur I and adjacent to the Iwan-e Mosaic and Ceremonial Hall in the northeast of the ancient city of Bishapur, one of the capitals of the Sasanian Empire, 15 kilometers west of the city of Kazerun.

== History ==
The Temple of Anahita was built in the second half of the 3rd century AD by order of Shapur I, the Sassanid king, in the city of Bishapur. The first excavations in the ancient city of Bishapur were conducted in 1935 under the leadership of French archaeologist Roman Ghirshman. During this excavation, Ghirshman succeeded in obtaining a full-scale sketch of the side corridors of the Anahita Temple. After a long hiatus in the excavation of the city of Bishapur, the operation was resumed under the leadership of Ali Akbar Sarfaraz in 1968. In this excavation operation, which lasted several years, the Anahita Temple was excavated and then organized and restored.

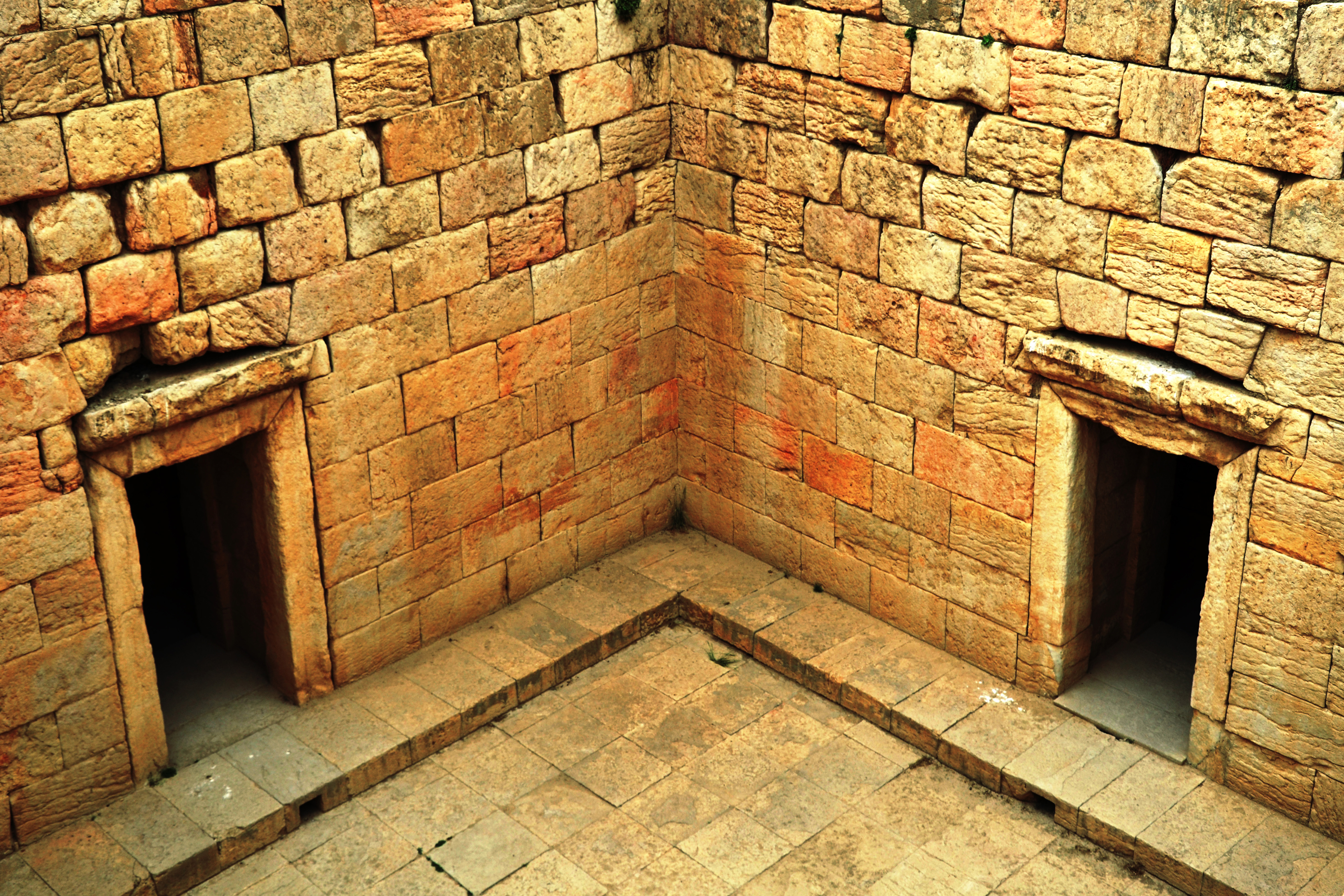
Interior view of Anahita Temple

== Worship ==
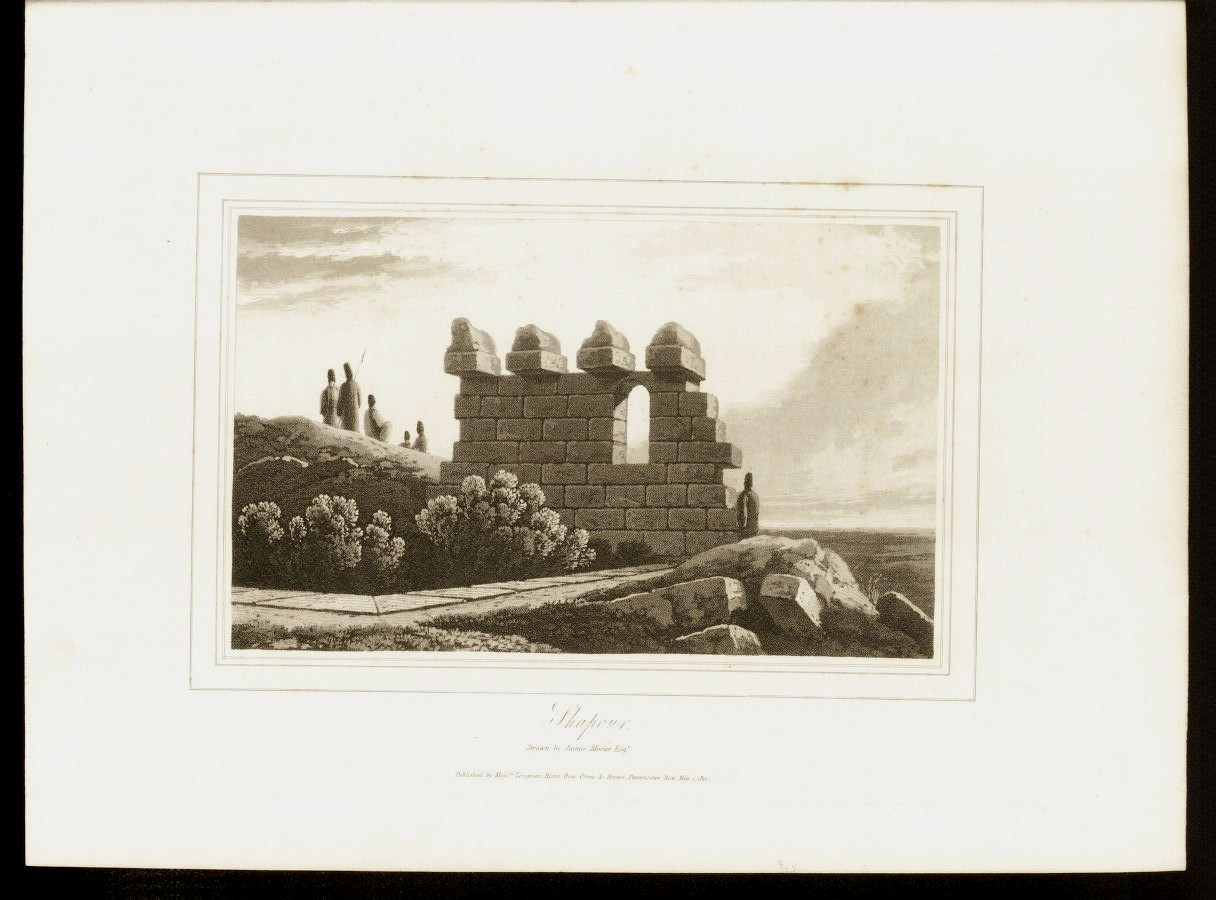
Temple of Anahita in 1812, by James Justinian Morier

The Anahita Temple was a place of worship for Anahita, an Aryan goddess. It was also the site of religious celebrations during the Sassanid period, during the seasons when the Shapur River flowed into the temple, and for ritual purification before entering the Fire temple.

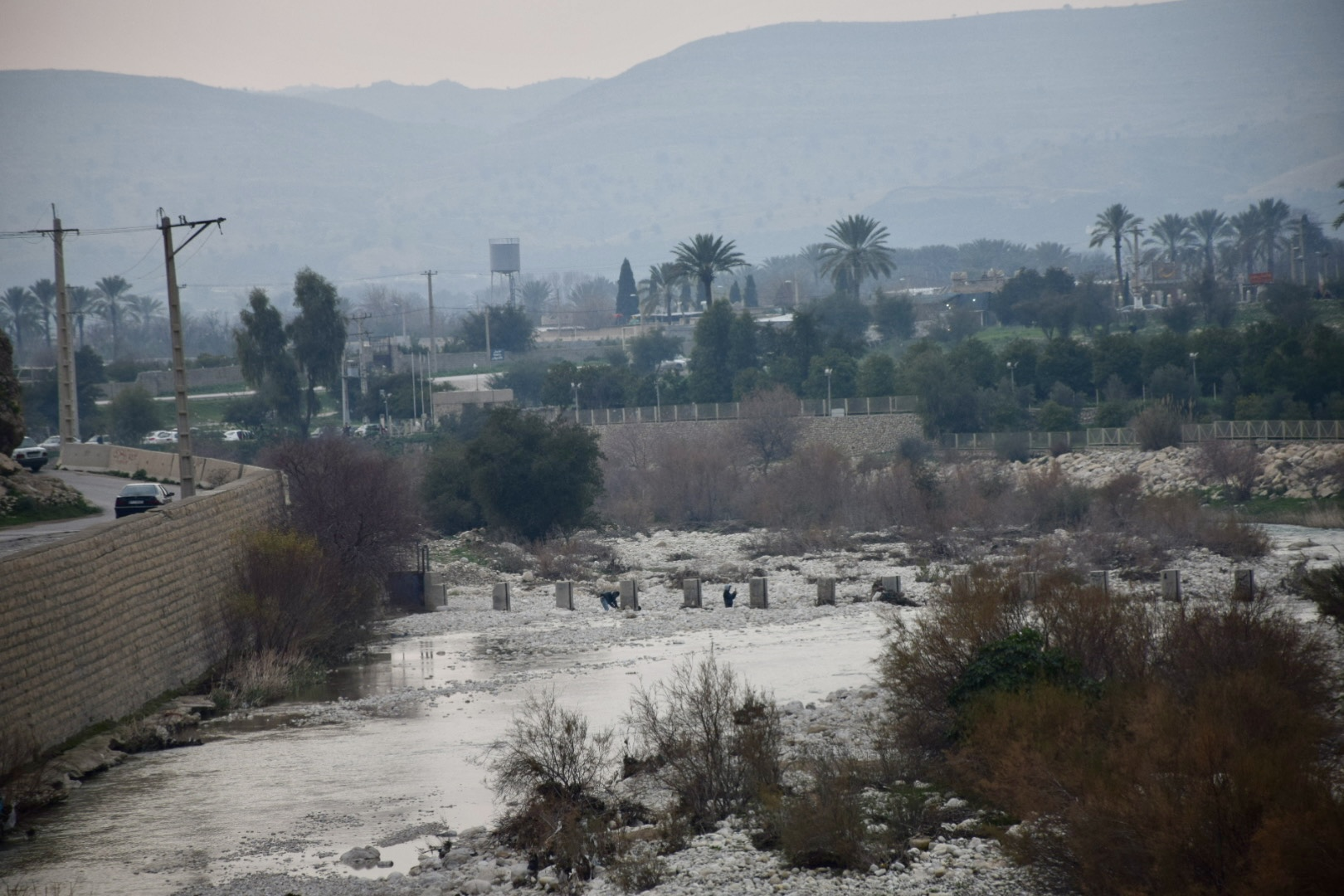
Shapur river

== Architectural features ==
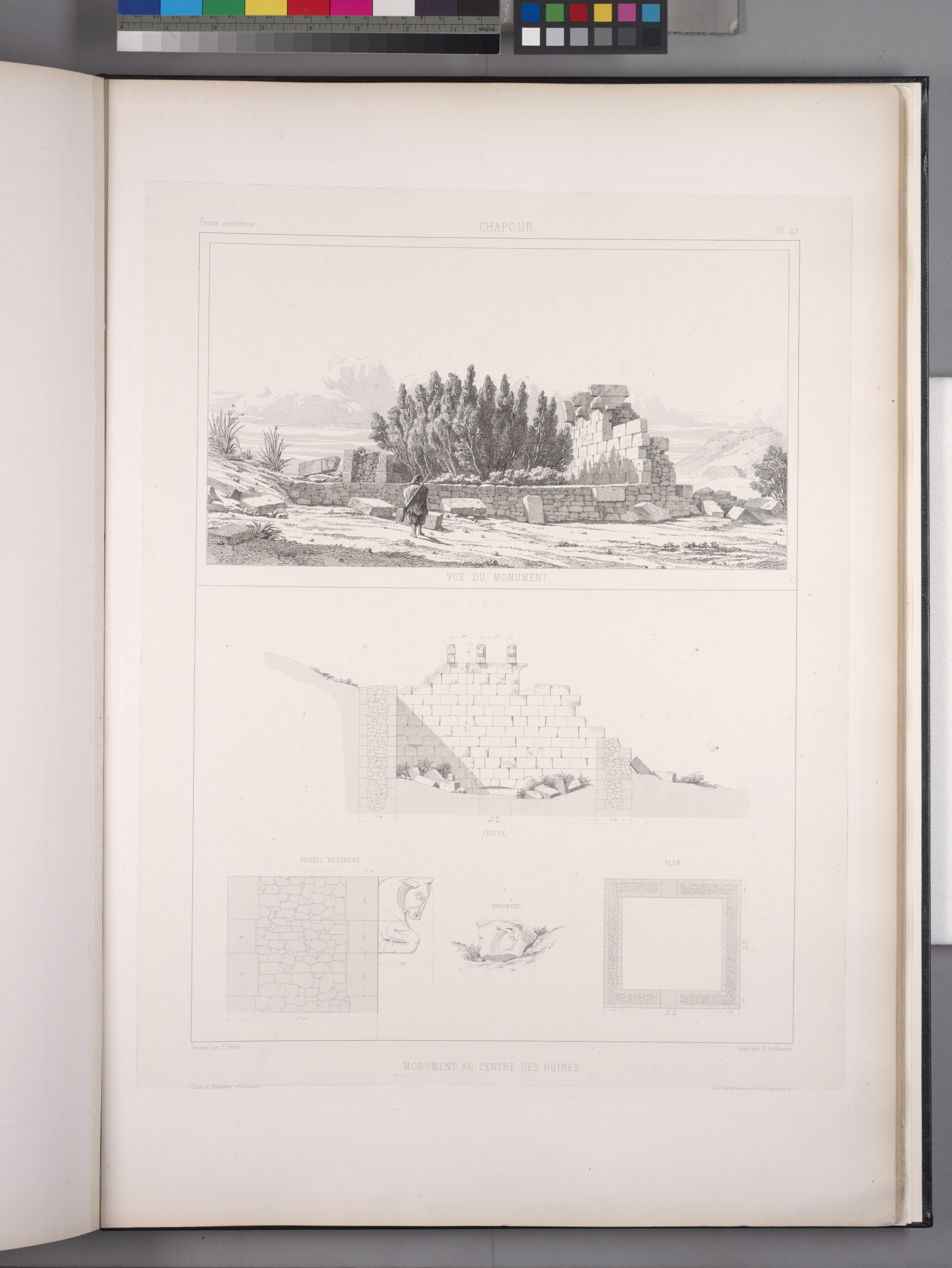
Historical painting of the Anahita Temple in 1851

The Temple of Anahita is a large rectangular room in the shape of a cube in a depression 6 meters above the ground, each side of which is nearly 14 meters. It is built of carved stones without mortar, double-walled, and in the Achaemenid architectural style. These stones are connected to each other with iron fasteners. A staircase from the palace was also connected to this temple. The temple has no roof and the purpose was to bring the water of the Shapur River, which flows 250 meters away, into the temple, so that after flowing inside the temple, it would be discharged through a Qanat.

== Gallery ==
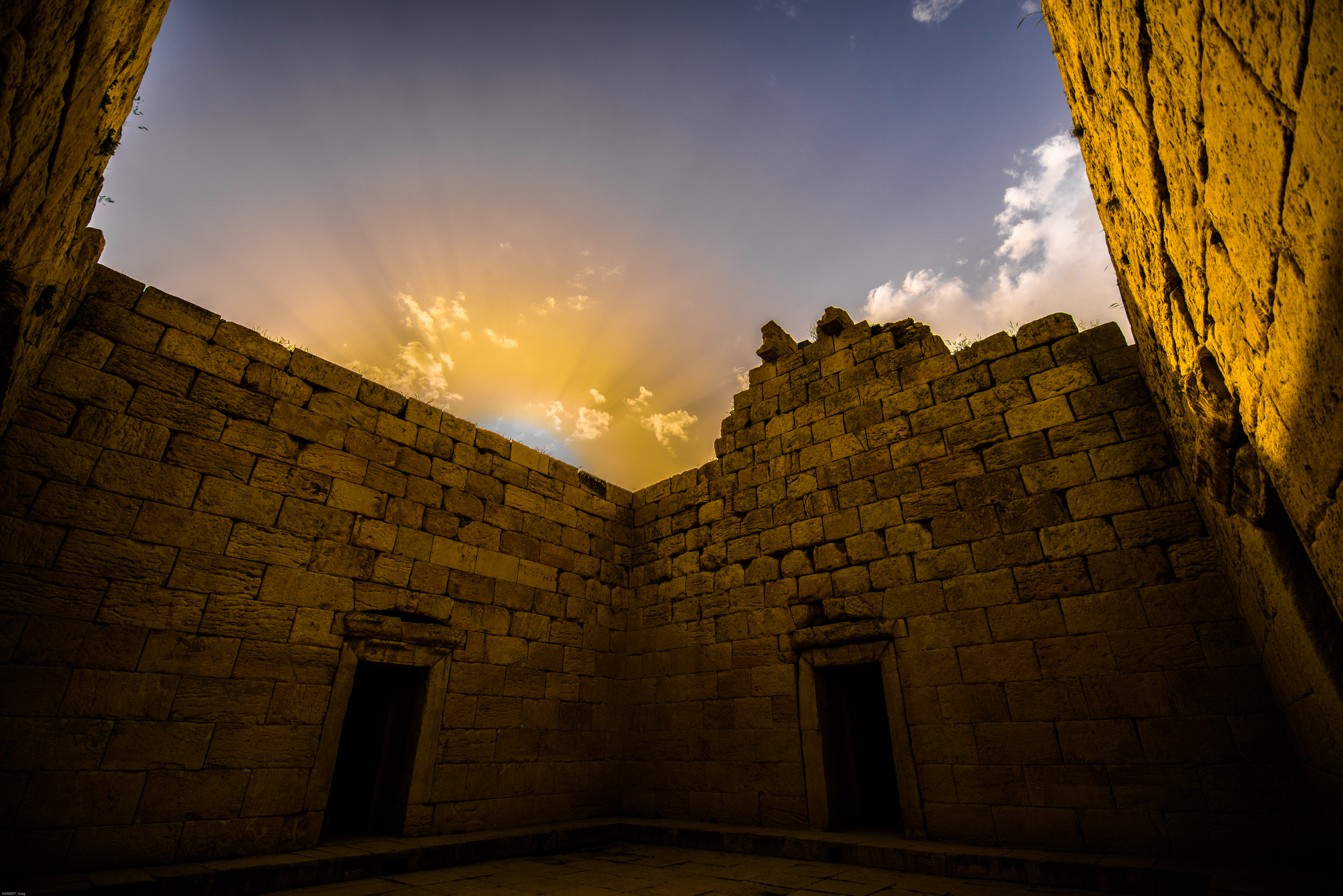

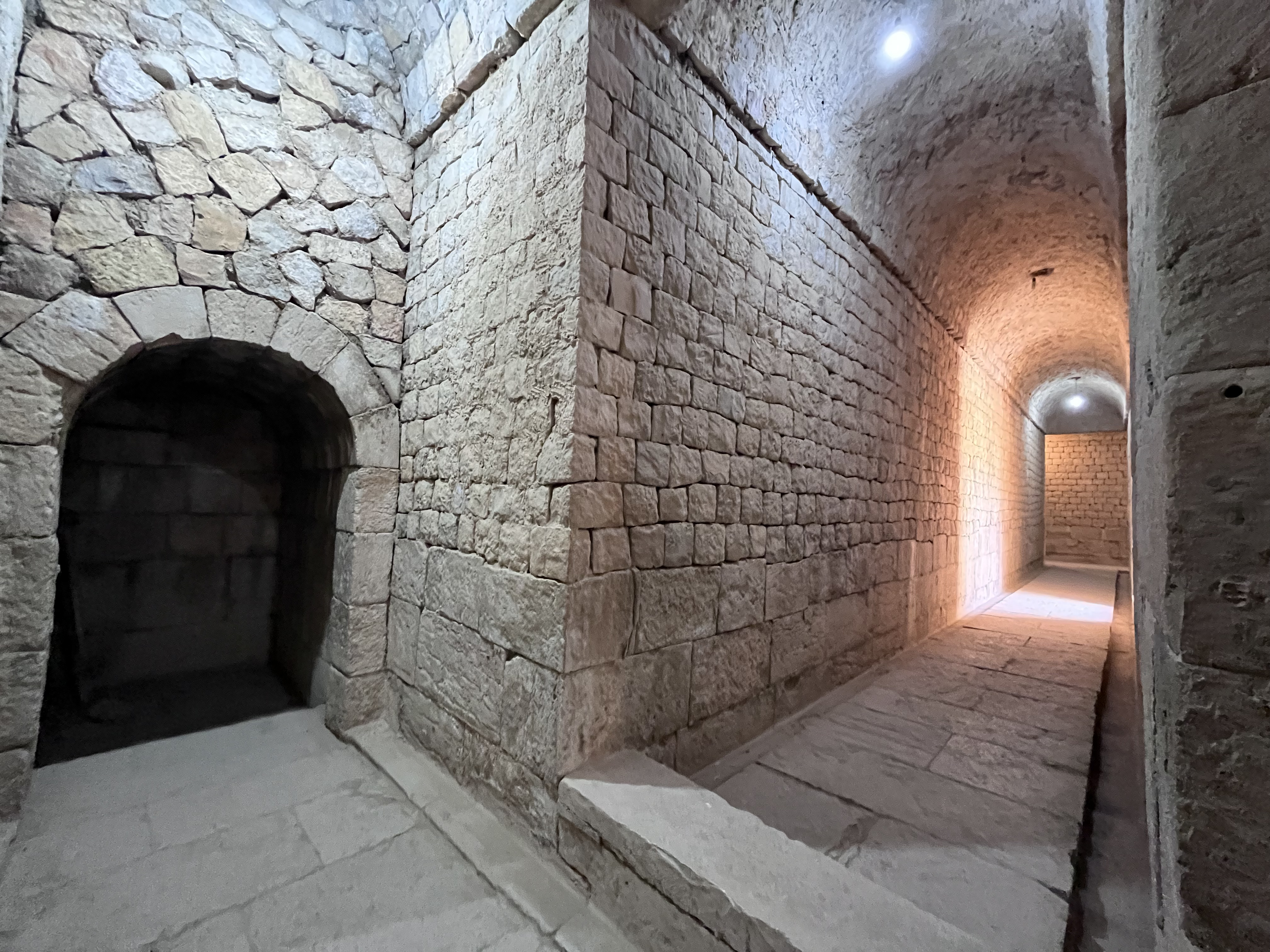

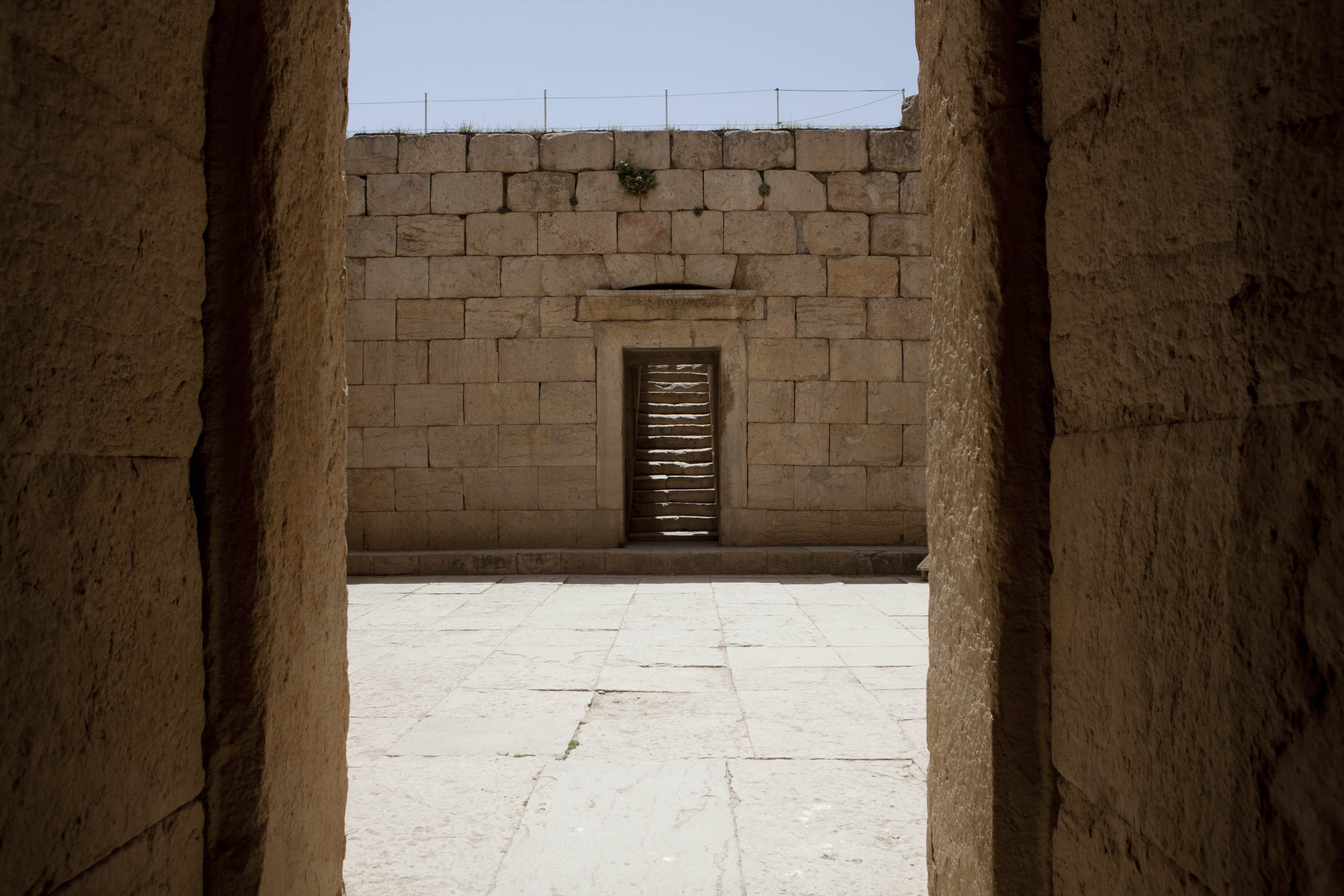

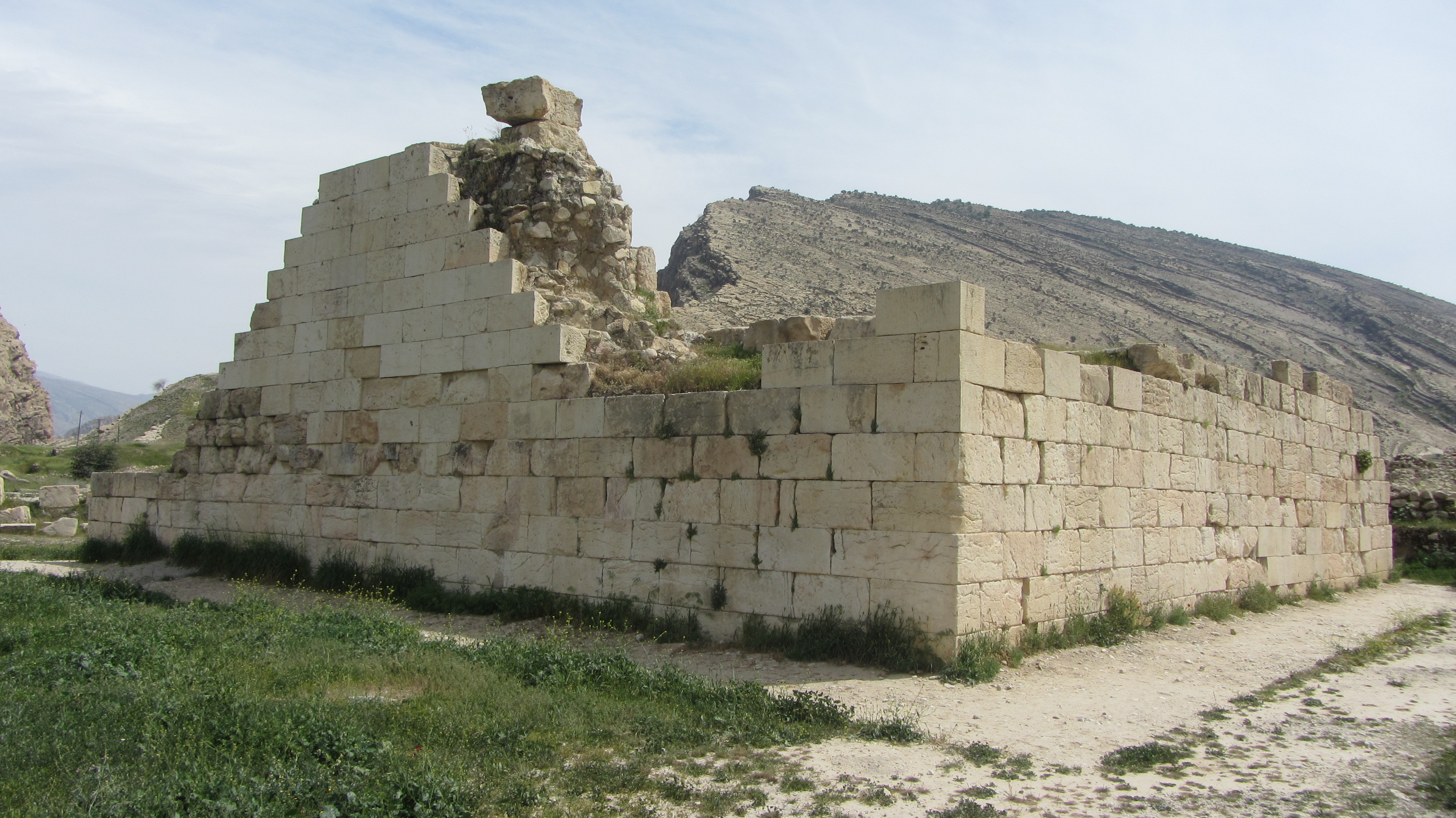

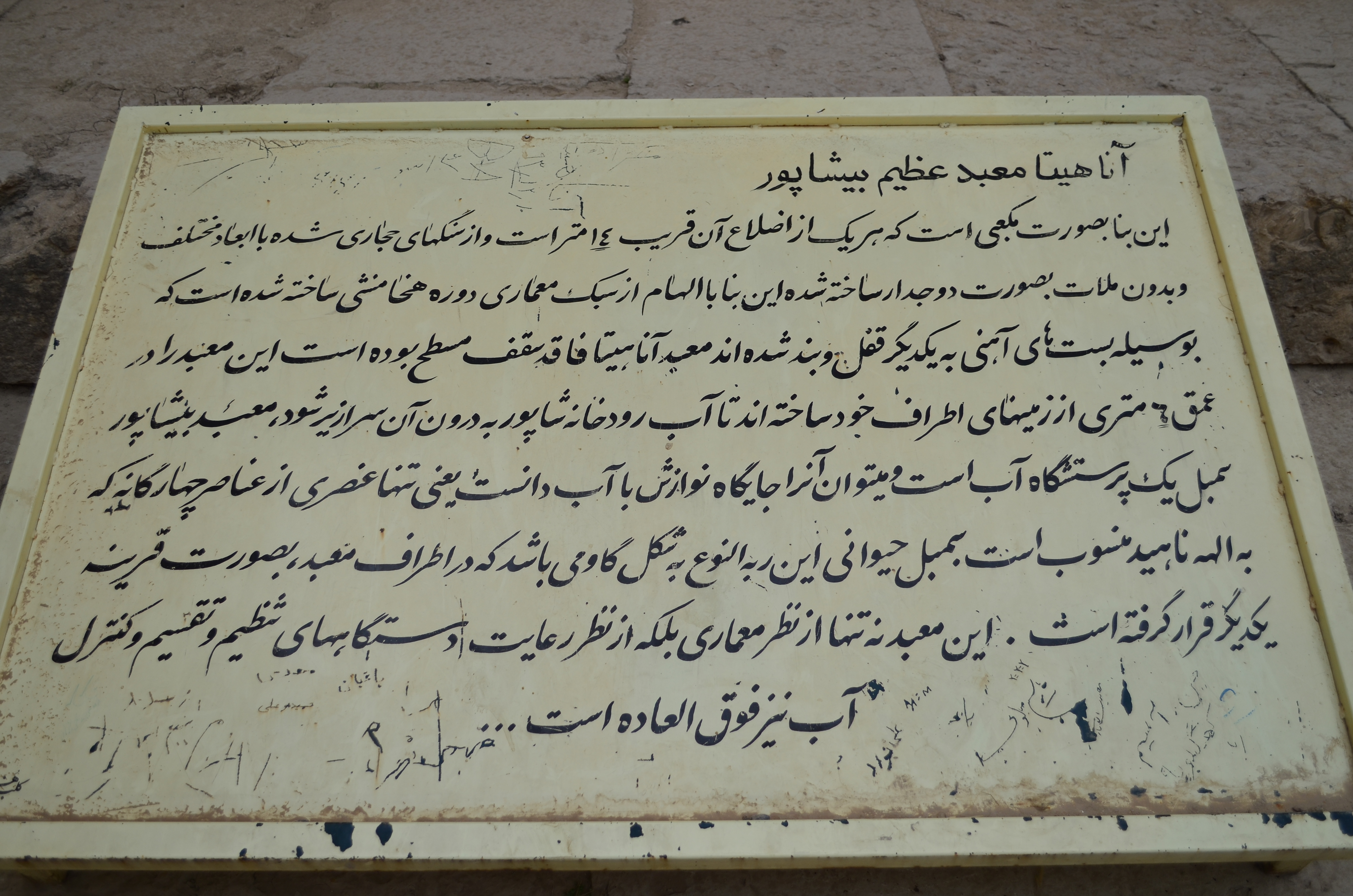

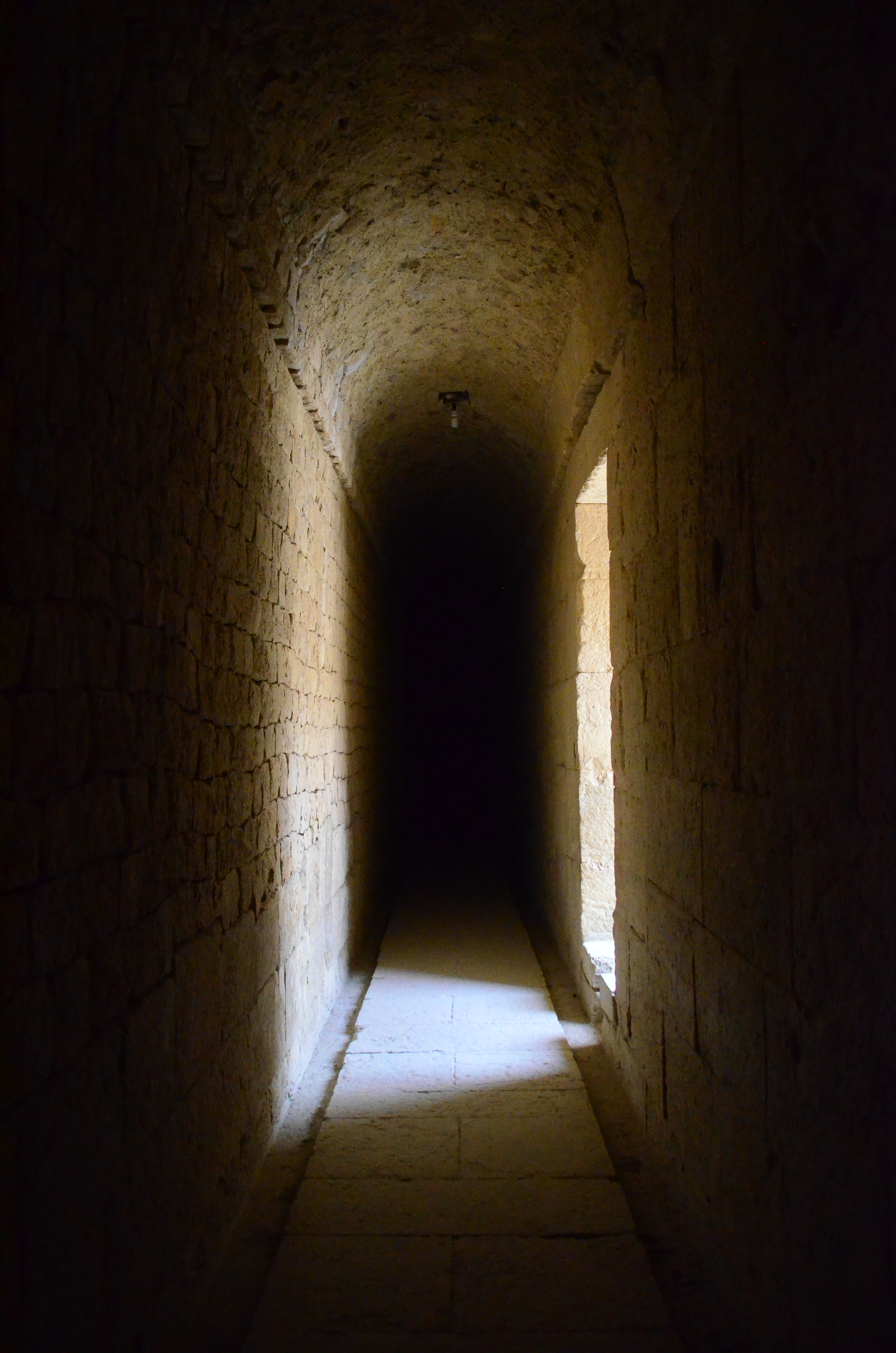

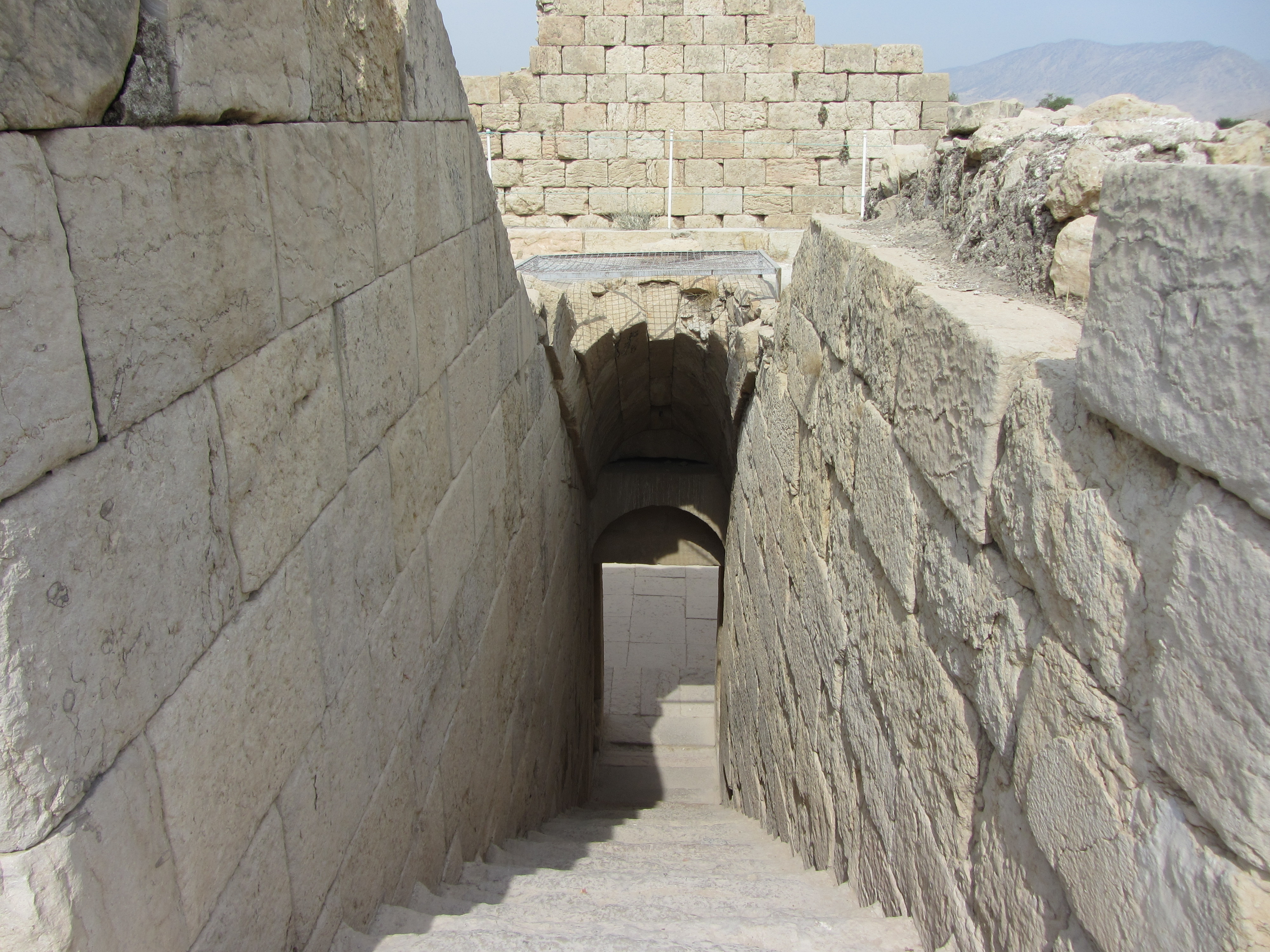

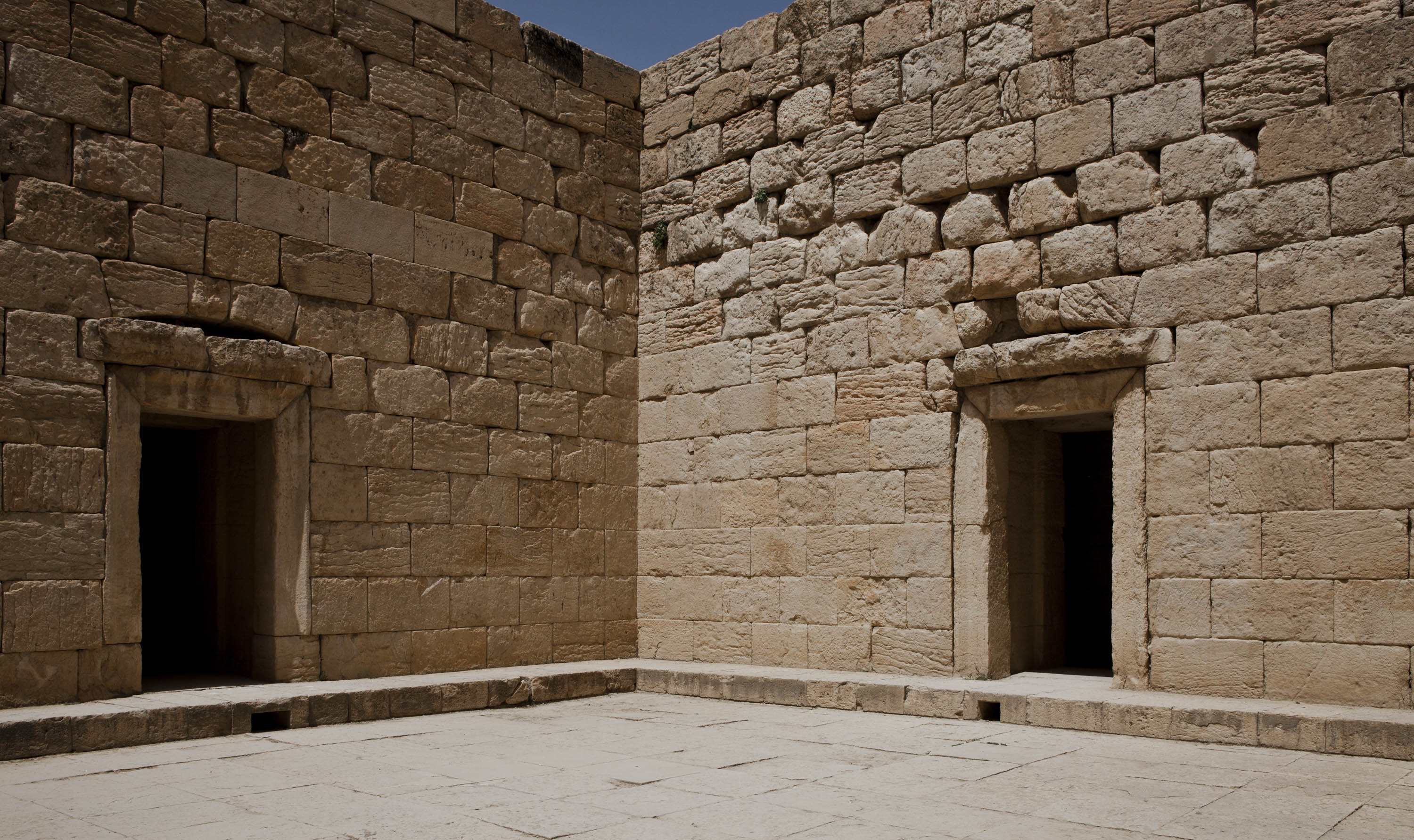

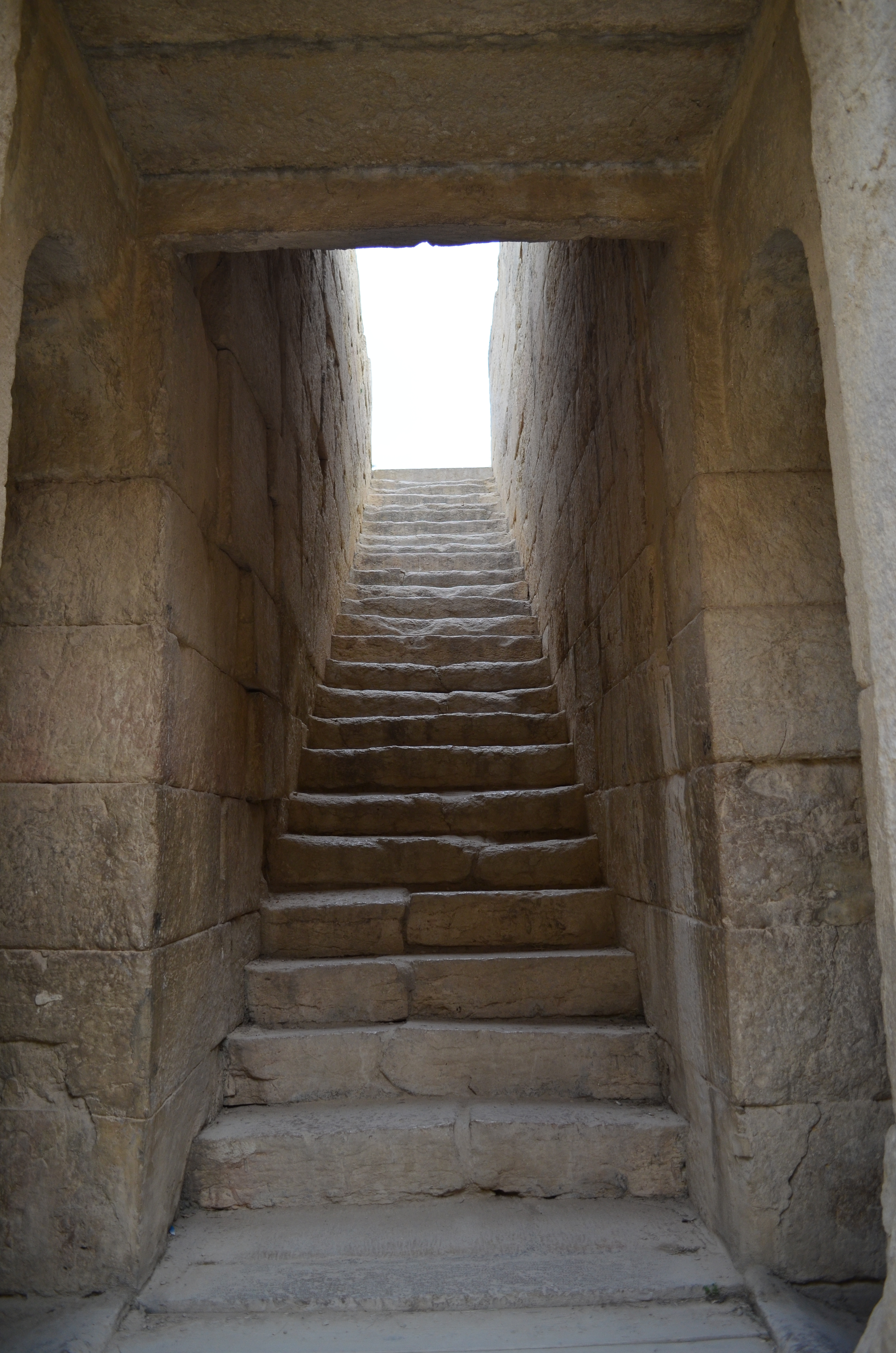

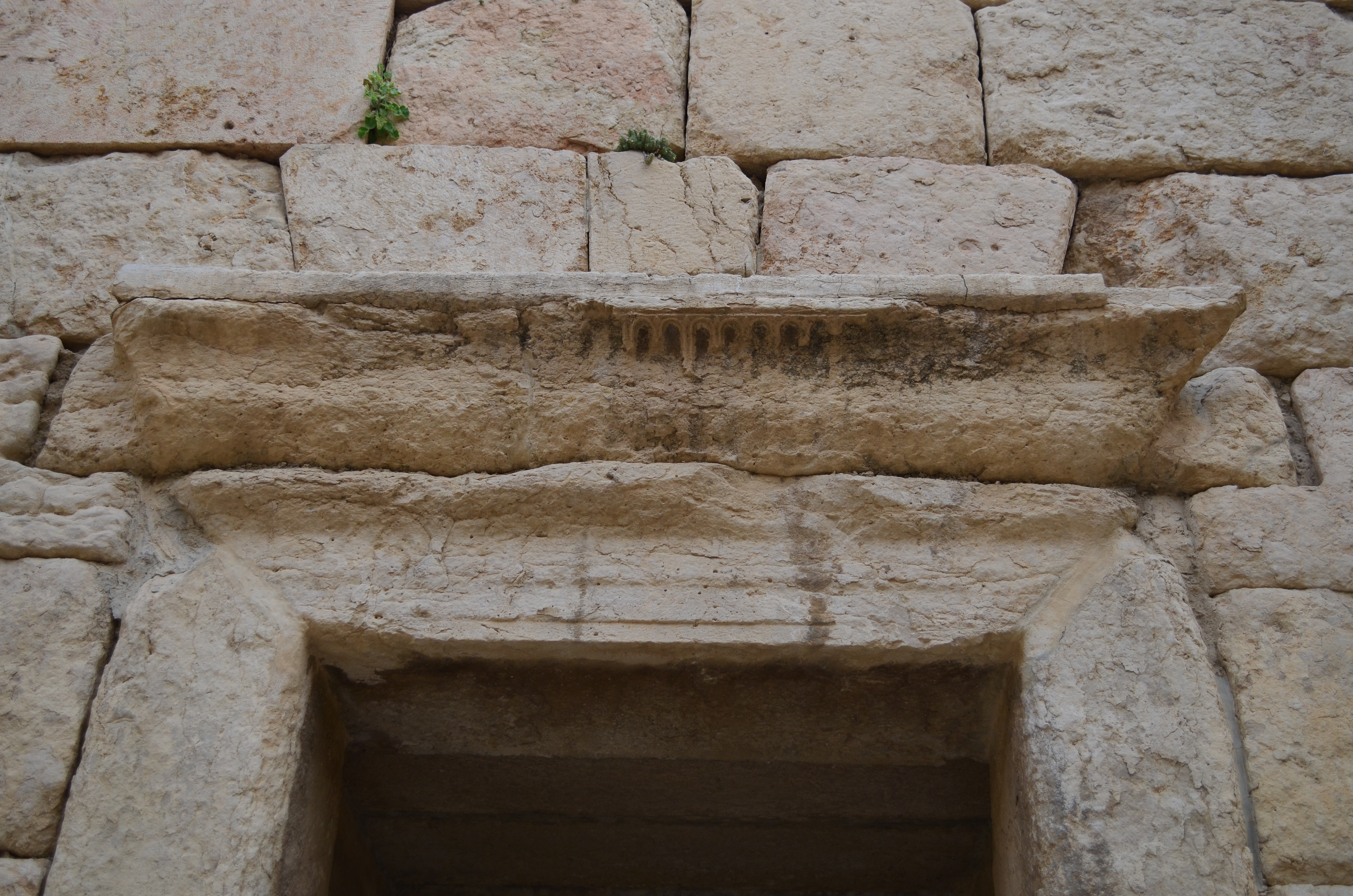

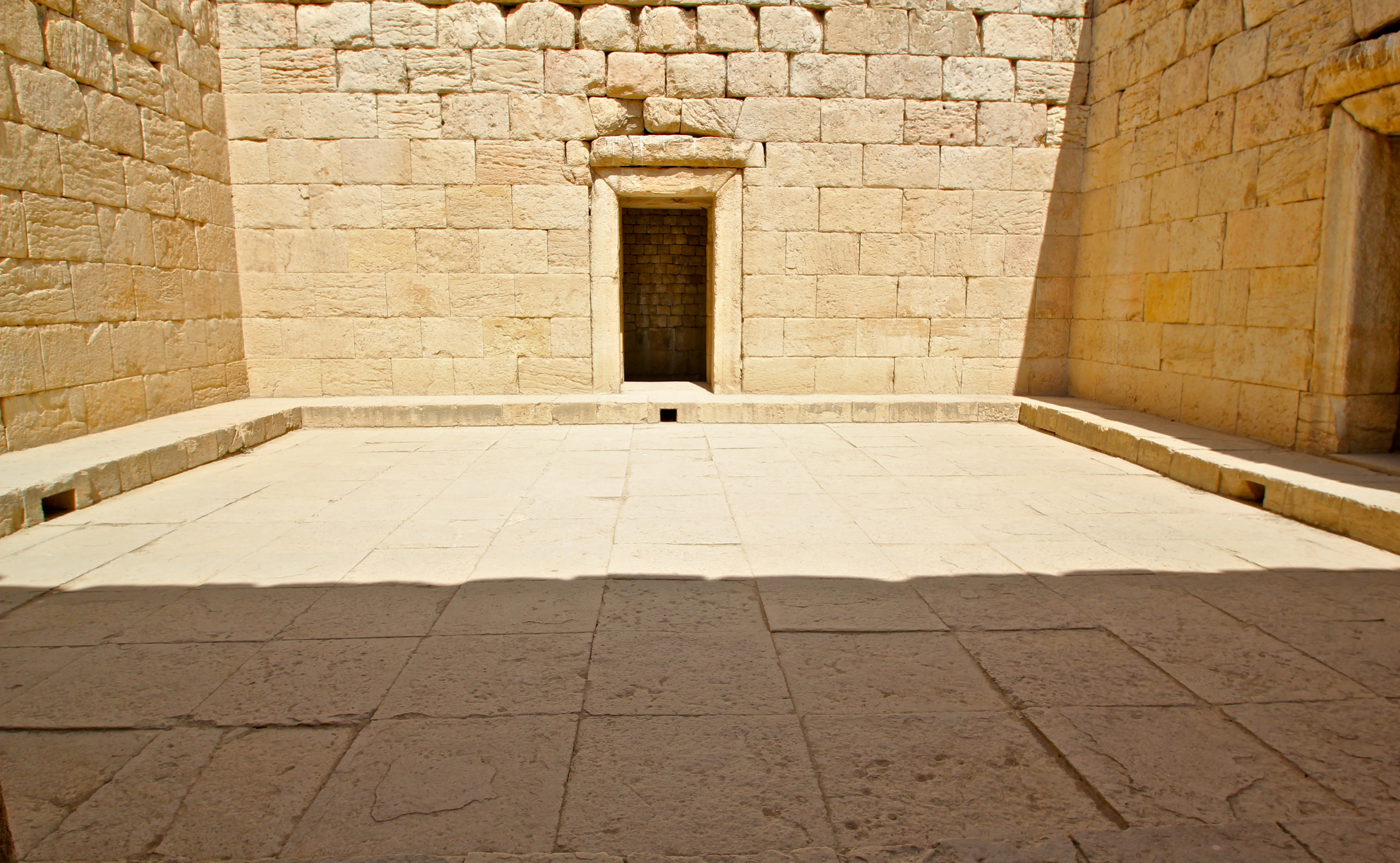

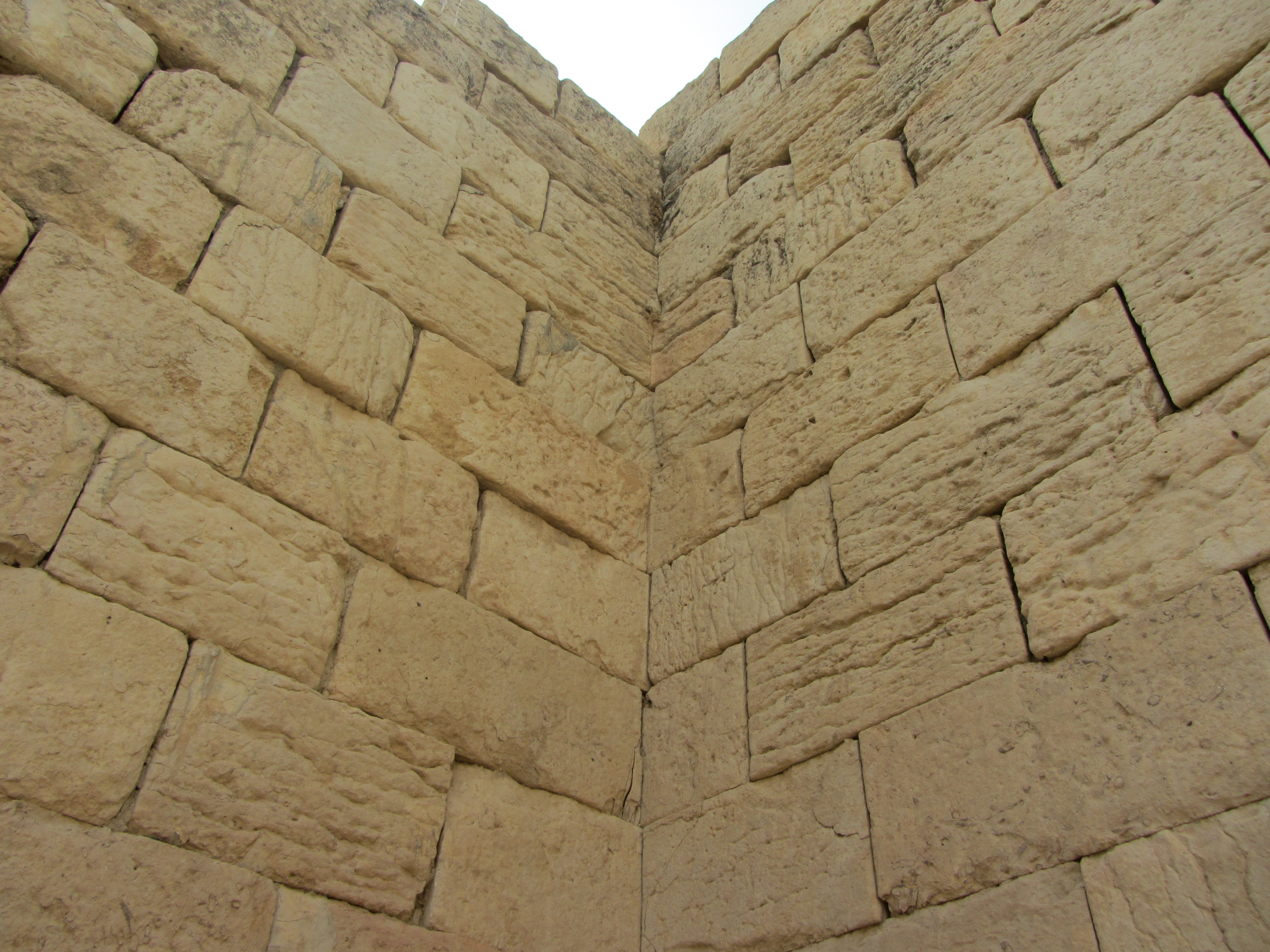

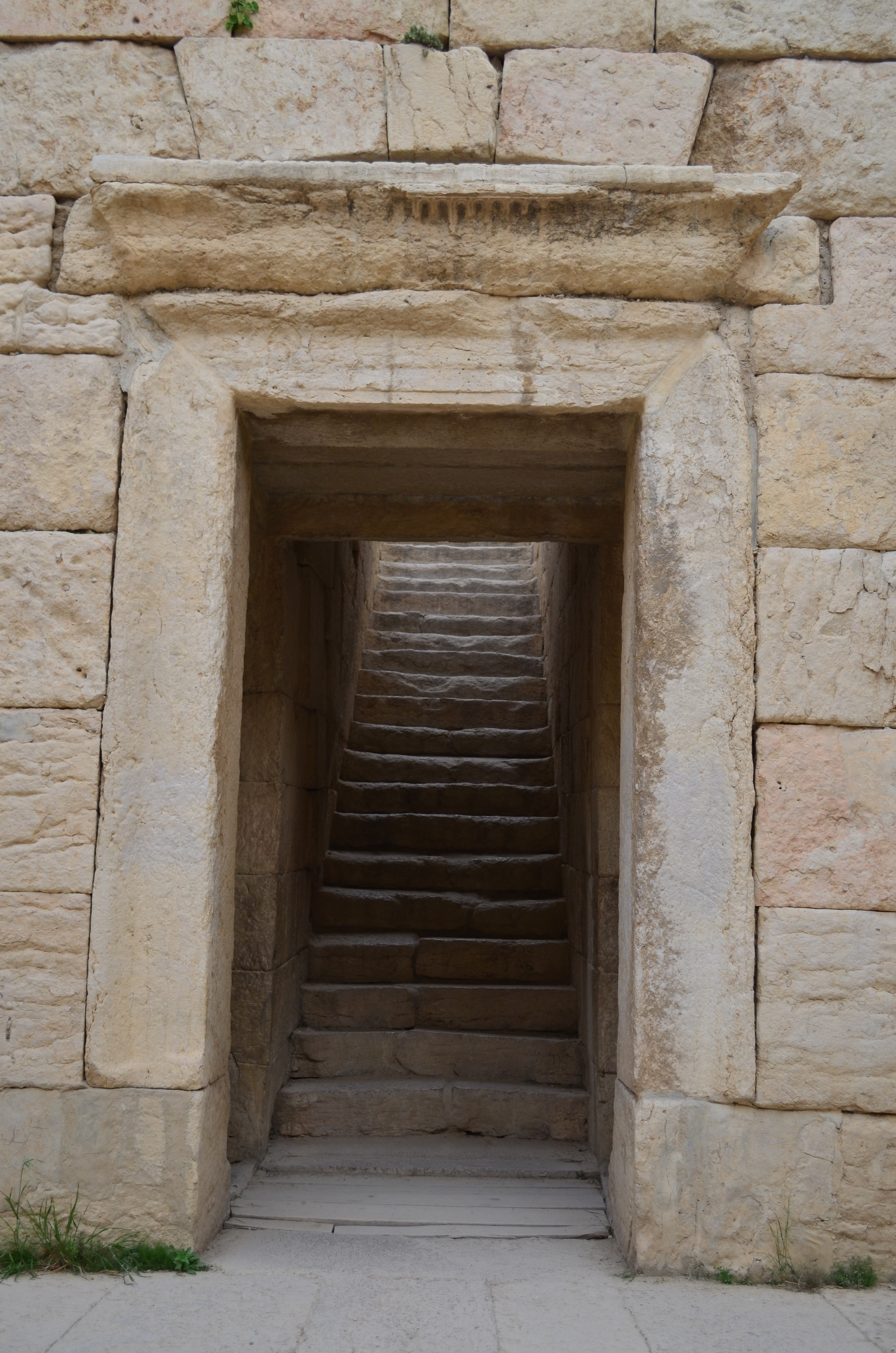

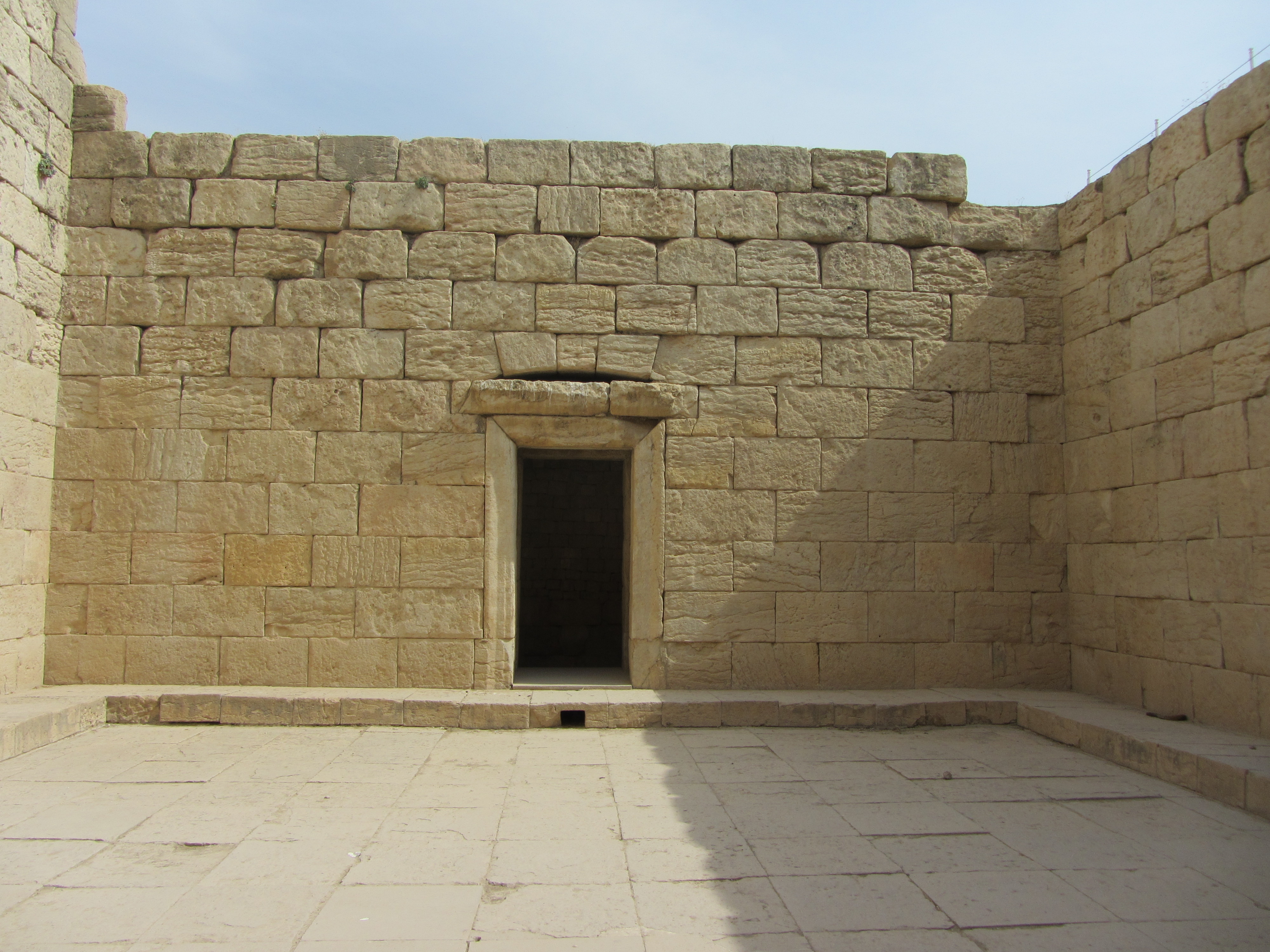

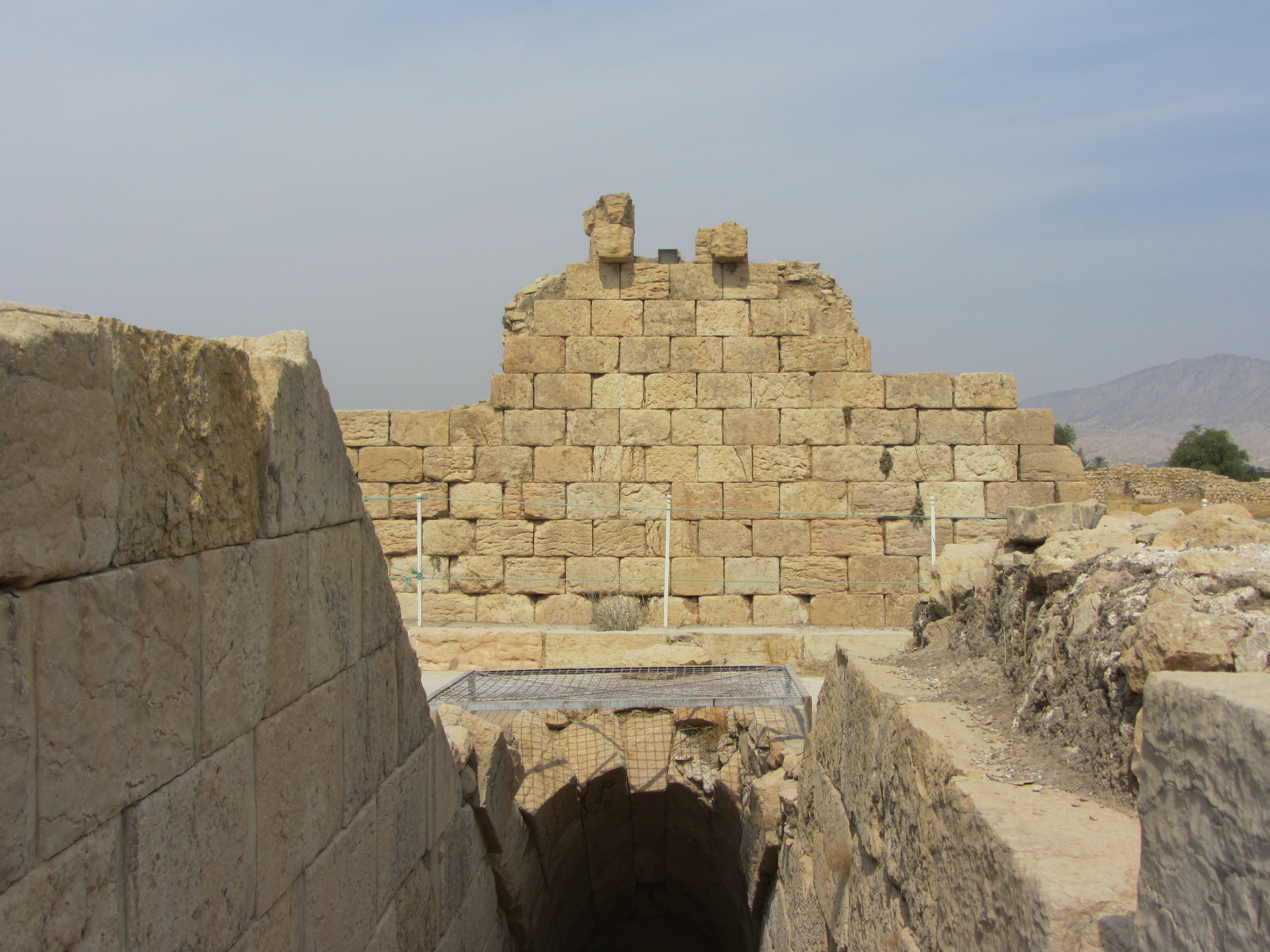

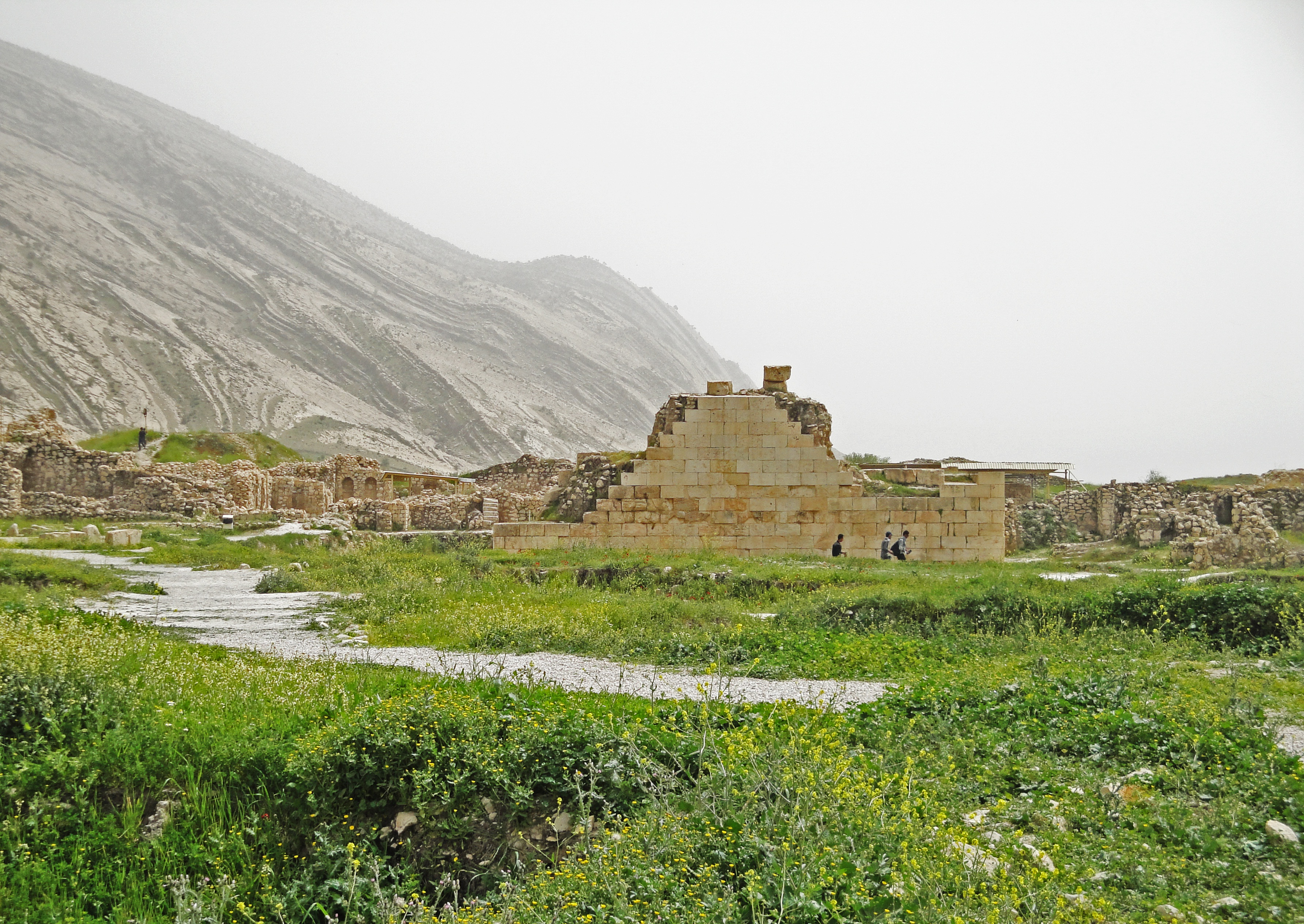
معبد آناهیتا

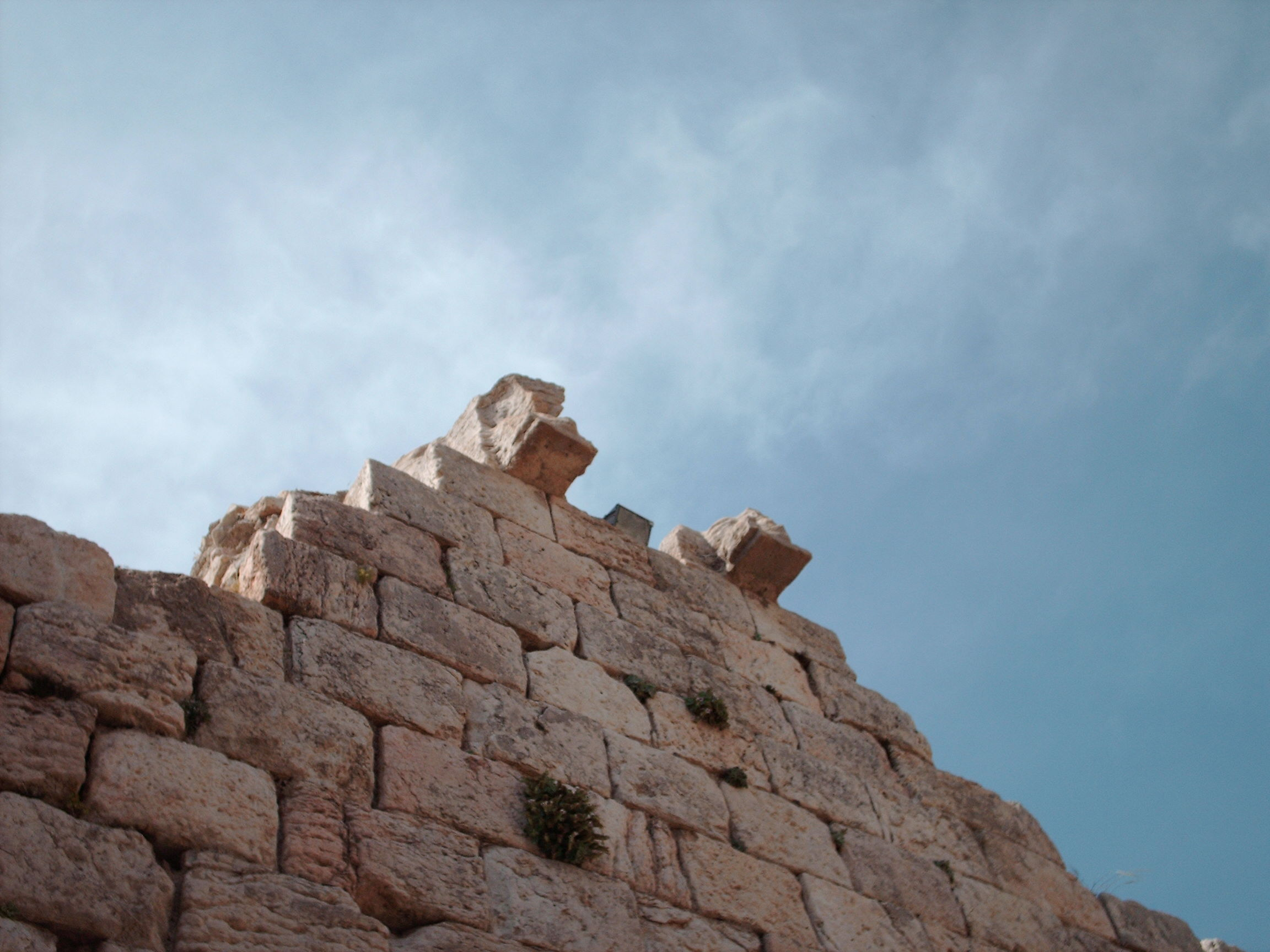
نیایشگاه آناهیتا بیشاپور

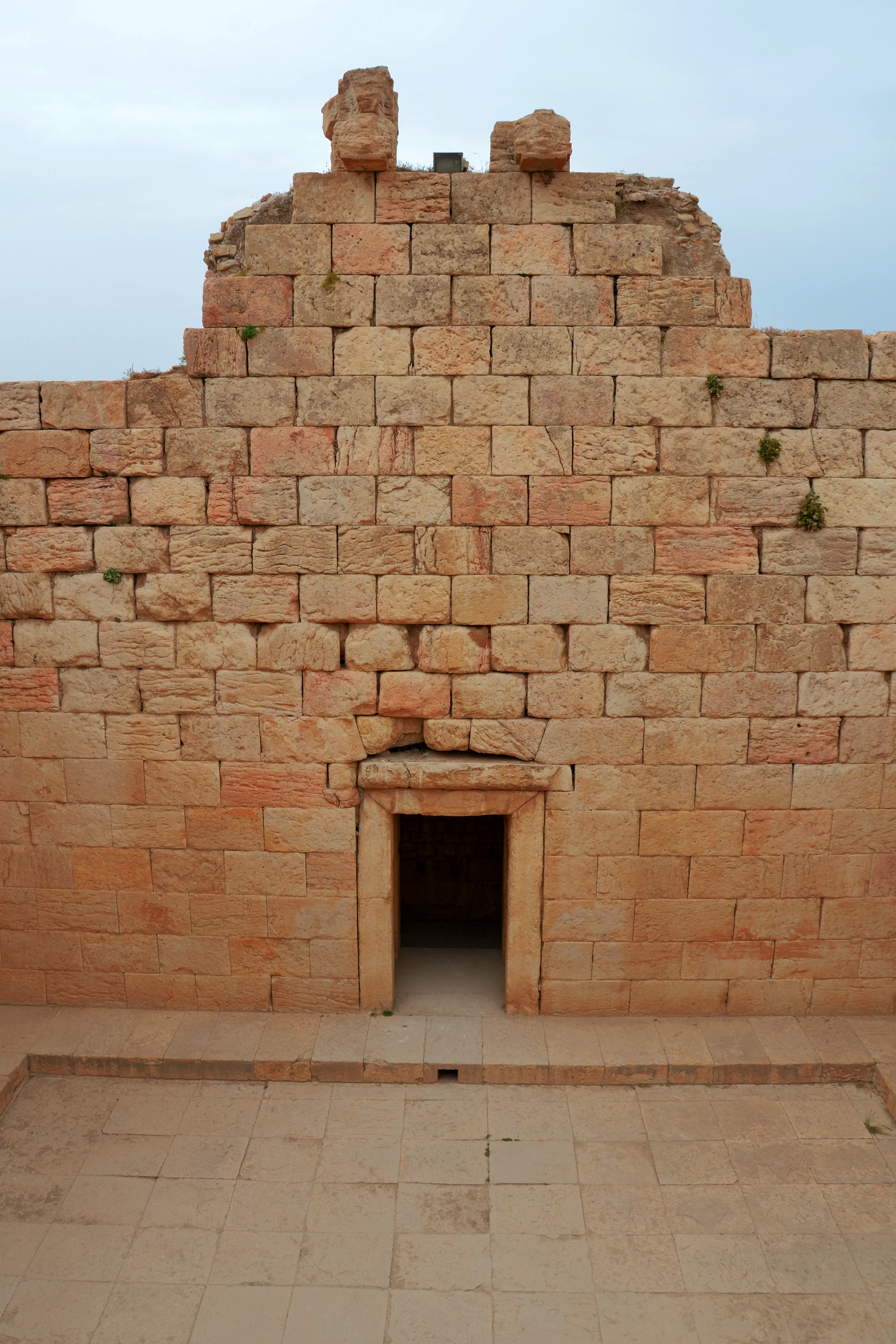
دیواره نیایشگاه

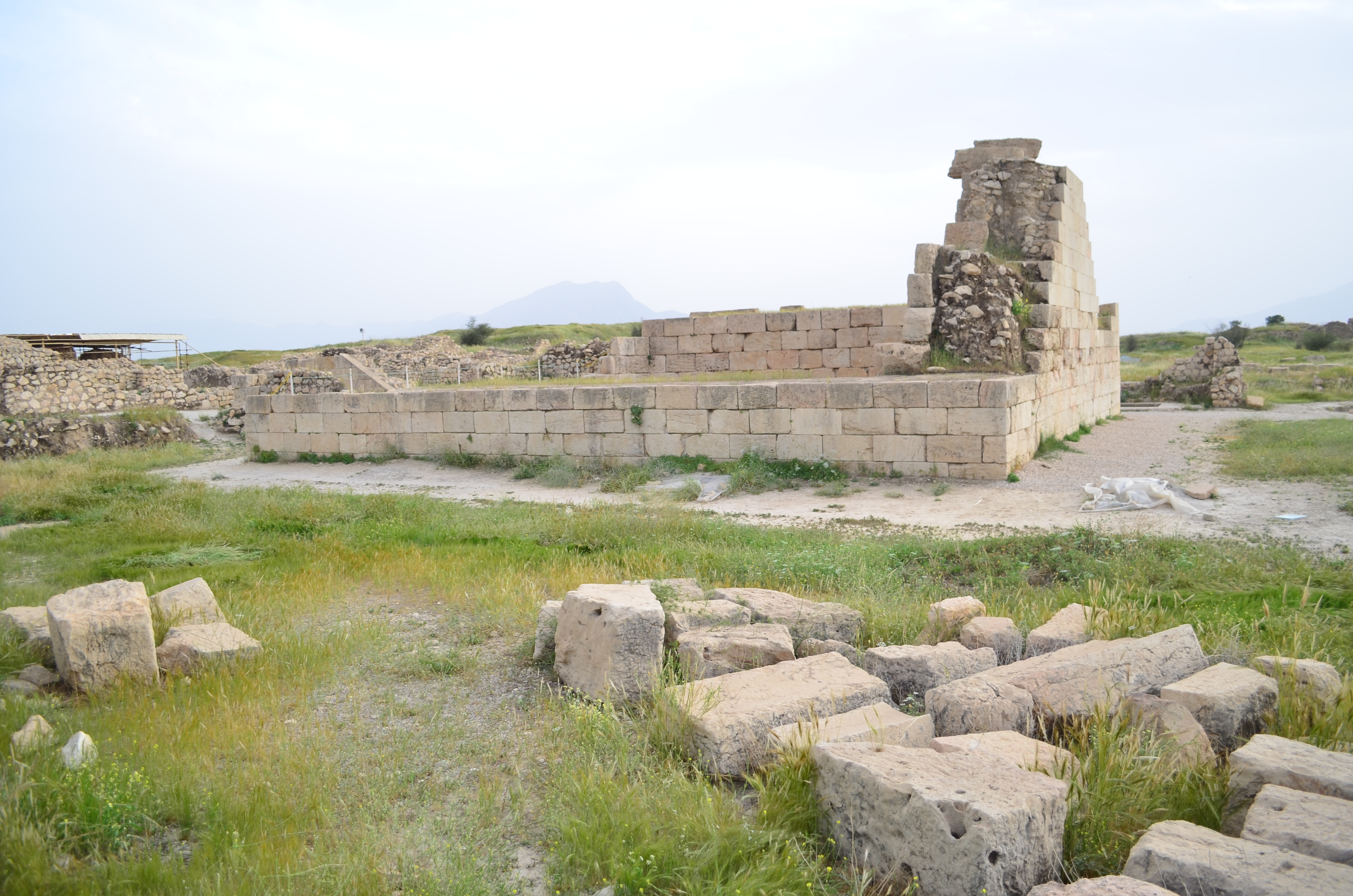
