= Balyan, Iran =

Balyan بليان
- Village
- Location within Iran
- Coordinates: 29°32′39″N 51°40′11″E
- Country: Iran
- Province: Fars
- County: Kazerun
- Bakhsh: Central
- Rural District: Balyan

Population (2006)
  - Total: 2,727
- Time zone: UTC+3:30 (IRST)
  - Summer (DST): UTC+4:30 (IRDT)

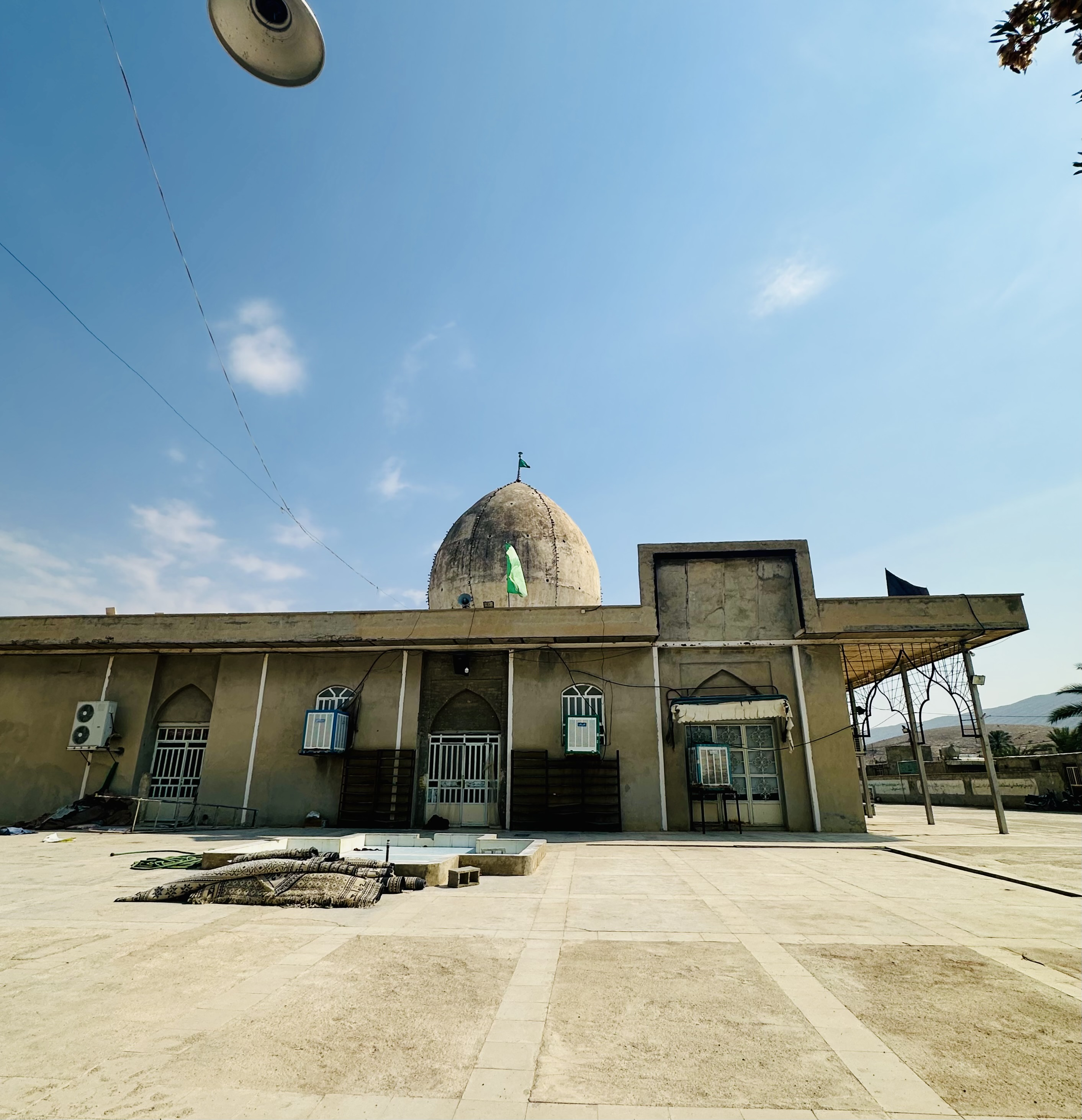

Balyan (Persian: بليان, also Romanized as Balyān) is a village in Balyan Rural District, in the Central District of Kazerun County, Fars province, Iran. At the 2006 census, its population was 2,727, in 577 families.
