= D. W. Robertson Jr. =

American academic (1914 – 1992)

Durant Waite Robertson Jr. (Washington, D.C. October 11, 1914 – Chapel Hill, North Carolina, July 26, 1992) was a scholar of medieval English literature and especially Geoffrey Chaucer. He taught at Princeton University from 1946 until his retirement in 1980 as the Murray Professor of English, and was "widely regarded as this [the twentieth] century's most influential Chaucer scholar".

== Early life and education ==
Robertson studied at the University of North Carolina at Chapel Hill where he received his Ph.D. degree in 1944. His dissertation on the work of Robert Mannyng, A Study of Certain Aspects of the Cultural Tradition of Handlyng Synne, was written under the direction of G. R. Coffman and Urban Tigner Holmes Jr. Subsequently he revised and published three important articles from it.

Robertson taught briefly at the University of Maryland before joining the faculty at Princeton in 1946, where he remained for the rest of his career.

== Scholarly career ==
Robertson's deeply historical approach to medieval English literature challenged and even angered many of the leading medievalists of the mid-20th century. Opposition to Robertson's critical approach at length took the form of a scholarly debate at the meeting of the English Institute of 1958–59. The book of papers published from that event proved that Robertson's "exegetical criticism", sometimes simply called "Robertsonianism", had many learned supporters as well as opponents.

Robertson's magnum opus was published in 1962 by Princeton University Press: A Preface to Chaucer. Studies in Medieval Perspectives, a massive work of 500 pages of text and 118 illustrations from medieval monastic manuscripts and religious sculpture and art. Critics were impressed by the extent of Robertson's reading in and grasp of primary sources, mainly in Latin and French, and secondary literature in every major European language as far back as the 19th century. Lynn Staley, Harrington and Shirley Drake Professor of the Humanities and Medieval & Renaissance Studies at Colgate University and one of Robertson's students, described it thus:

"His major study, A Preface to Chaucer (1962), challenged medieval studies when its tenets were increasingly influenced by the New Criticism; he insisted on the priority of primary texts in interpreting the hierarchical, Augustinian culture of the Middle Ages."

It was also intimidating to medievalists of his generation, most of whom had never seen any need to study the range of primary sources, particularly religious writings in Latin, which Robertson had mastered. As late as 1965, medievalist and folklore scholar Francis Lee Utley called it "a strange hodgepodge...insulting to the community of scholars and, indeed, to the Twentieth Century itself".

Scholarly supporters of Robertson's critical school gathered in March 1967 at the first annual conference of the Center for Medieval and Early Renaissance Studies at State University of New York at Binghamton, an event often referred to among medievalists as "the Courtly Love conference". The volume of papers from this conference, published the following year, has retained its importance as a watershed in the spread of a new paradigm of the concept of medieval courtly love. A concept that Robertson believed was irrelevant to the study of the Middle Ages itself and rather a 19th and 20th century cultural practice.

== Teaching at Princeton ==
Robertson was a popular and engaging lecturer, and his seminars were usually full. Professor Staley has summarized his approach as follows:

"His gift for impersonation gave life to the dead: he could stage a conversation between John of Gaunt and John Wyclif as though he had been a fly on the wall, or recount Ovid's tales in a Carolina accent and with down-home details that made them as meaningful as they are slyly ironic. He insisted on the ways in which humor was fundamental to meaning. He shared his ongoing work with us, his moments of revelation, his tremendous interest in literature and cultural history. He insisted that we find proof for what we said in class or wrote in papers. He made it possible for me to learn in ways many professors might not have by giving me the freedom to chase my ideas through Firestone Library...He read the work we turned in quickly and willingly; he praised and criticized. The key to his approach was patience: he would not hound a student to finish chapters or to meet deadlines; you had to be self-directed, but Robbie met you more than halfway, and was quick to promote work he saw as significant."

Among Robertson's most important scholarly legacies is the number of his students among the prominent medievalists of succeeding generations. These include Robert P. Miller, Paul Olson, Chauncey Wood, John V. Fleming, Alan T. Gaylord, David Lyle Jeffrey, Marc Pelen, and Lynn Staley.

Robertson retired from Princeton at the age of 65 in 1980. In his honor, Princeton University Press published Essays in Medieval Culture (1980), a collection of 24 of his essays. Among them are some of Robertson's bold attempts to extend the application of "Robertsonianism" beyond the confines of the Middle Ages: to Renaissance art (Leonardo), sixteenth-century literature (Sidney, Shakespeare's Hamlet), and beyond (Alexander Pope).

== Family ==
Robertson married Betty McLean Hansen in 1937. They had one daughter, Susanna Howley, and two sons, Durant Waite Robertson III and Douglas Robertson.

== Retirement ==
Robertson's research in retirement took him in the direction of the social historical context of literature, an interest he had occasionally expressed earlier. He did it so well that scholar Peter G. Beidler included one of Robertson's later essays, "Simple Signs from Everyday Life in Chaucer" (1981) in a bibliography of Marxist approaches to Chaucer. Robertson would be shocked, but also no doubt amused, at this gesture.

== Death ==
Suffering from declining health, Robertson entered a retirement home near his home in Chapel Hill, North Carolina, where he died in 1992.

== Influence ==
Alan T. Gaylord, Dartmouth College:

"Robertson's A Preface to Chaucer: Studies in Medieval Perspectives ... was and is, quite simply, the most important book on Chaucer in the twentieth century."

Lee Patterson, Yale University:

"...Exegetics remains, apparently against all odds, the great unfinished business of Medieval Studies."

Steven Justice, University of California, Berkeley:

"Robertson shows something important. I have been suggesting that the last generation of medieval literary study could not trenchantly criticize Robertson's intellectual vices—and the habit of creating a kind of period subjectivity for the Middle Ages was the direst of these—because it practiced similar vices in different tones of voice. Of course, no one "stole" Robertson; it is just that anyone was apt to be embarrassed by thinking closely about him. But in this last inconsistency of his we can see one of his virtues and one of the reasons younger scholars, rediscovering him, have found a wealth of suggestiveness in his work (at least this is my impression) that their elders did not. His reading of Augustine here displays a counterenergy, a willingness to be surprised by the past."

- 1961. Ronald Salmon Crane. "On Hypotheses in 'Historical Criticism": Apropos of Certain Contemporary Medievalists." The Idea of the Humanities and Other Essays Critical and Historical. Chicago: University of Chicago Press, 1968: v.2, 236-260.
- 1965. Francis Lee Utley. Robertsonianism Redivivus. Romance Philology 19. 250-260.
- 1967–68. A. Leigh DeNeef. Robertson and the Critics. Chaucer Review 2. 205-234.
- 1967. Paul Theiner. Robertsonianism and the Idea of Literary History. Studies in Medieval Culture 6-7. 195-204.
- 1982. M. A. Manzalaoui. Robertson and Eloise. Downside Review 100. 280-289.
- 1987. Lee Patterson. Historical Criticism and the Development of Chaucer Studies. Negotiating the Past. Madison WI: University of Wisconsin Press: 1-40, esp. 26-36.
- 1996. Lynn Staley. Durant Waite Robertson Jr. Department of English. Luminaries. Princeton Faculty Remembered. Edited Patricia H. Marks. Princeton NJ: Association of Princeton Graduate Alumni: 229-234.
- Gaylord, Alan T. (2006). "Reflections on D.W. Robertson Jr., and 'Exegetical Criticism.'". Chaucer Review. 40 (3): 311–33. doi:10.1353/cr.2006.0003. ISSN 0009-2002. S2CID 171039996.
- Justice Steven, Steven (2009). "Who Stole Robertson?". PMLA. 124 (2). Modern Language Association: 609–15. doi:10.1632/pmla.2009.124.2.609. ISSN 0030-8129. S2CID 162260035. Essay has bibliography of other works discussing Robertson's legacy and influence.

== Publications ==
Books:

- 1951. Piers Plowman and Scriptural Tradition (with Bernard F. Huppé). Princeton University Press.
- 1962. A Preface to Chaucer. Studies in Medieval Perspectives. Princeton University Press.
- 1963. Fruyt and Chaff: Studies in Chaucer's Allegories (with Bernard F. Huppé). Princeton University Press.
- 1968. Chaucer's London. John Wiley & Sons.
- 1970. The Literature of Medieval England. McGraw-Hill.
- 1972. Abelard and Heloise. Dial Press.
- 1980. Essays in Medieval Culture. Princeton University Press.
- 1991. Lismahago's Meditations. As Recorded by Abel Goast. écrazez l'enfâme. Cleveland OH: The Cobham and Hatherton Press.
- 2017. Uncollected Essays. With a Foreword by Paul A. Olson

== See also ==
- courtly love
- Johan Huizinga
- C. S. Lewis

Preceded by Gerald Eades Bentley	Murray Professor of English Literature at Princeton University; 1970–1980	Succeeded by Thomas McFarland
