= Henry A. Kelly =

American scholar (born 1934)

Henry Ansgar Kelly (born Fort Dodge, Iowa, June 6, 1934) is distinguished research professor of English at the University of California, Los Angeles.

Kelly received his A.B. in classics from St. Louis University in 1959 and two years later his A.M in English literature and Ph.L. in philosophy from the same university. He entered Harvard University in 1961, receiving his Ph.D. in 1965. During his time at Harvard Kelly was selected as a junior fellow by the Harvard Society of Fellows. From 1964 to 1966, Kelly took courses at the Boston College School of Theology and Ministry as a Jesuit scholastic.

Kelly was a resident scholar at the American Academy in Rome in 1966. The following year, Kelly became assistant professor in the Department of English at UCLA. He was promoted to associate professor in 1969 and to professor in 1972. From 1980 to 1981 Kelly was visiting professor at the University of Sydney. He was distinguished professor at UCLA from 1986 to 2004, and Emerit Distinguished Professor from 2004 to 2012. Since then he has been distinguished professor of English.

Kelly's research interests include medieval and Renaissance literature and history, biblical studies, and ecclesiastical history and theology, especially the history of the Devil.

Kelly has received several awards and honors in his career. He was a fellow of the John Simon Guggenheim Foundation (1971–72), the National Endowment for the Humanities (1980–81; 1996–97), the Del Amo Endowment (1986), and was elected a Fellow of the Medieval Academy of America (1986). He served as vice-president (1986–88) and president (1988–1990) of the Medieval Association of the Pacific. He was the recipient of a UC President's Research Fellowship in the Humanities (1996–97) and director of the Center of Medieval and Renaissance Studies at UCLA. In the Festschrift published in his honor when he stepped down from the latter position in 2003, his scholarly career was summed up thus: "Henry Ansgar (Andy) Kelly’s prolific scholarship ranges over a wide variety of topics: medieval and renaissance literature and history (in English, Latin, Spanish, French, and Italian, from Aristotle to Shakespeare—and Seamus Heaney), ecclesiastical history and theology, demonology, canon law and Church ritual, lay piety, drama, lexicology, philology, and contemporary academic and national politics. He is the author of twelve books and about a hundred articles and reviews. His learning is famously encyclopedic."

In 2009, he received the UCLA Dickson Emeritus Professorship Award, and in 2018, the University of California Constantine Panunzio Distinguished Emeritus Award. The citation in the latter reads:

"'Andy' Kelly, Distinguished Research Professor of English, retired in 2004 and his contributions to UCLA and to scholarship since that time have been impressive. His scholarly contributions since retirement include 6 books and 37 papers on a wide range of topics: literature (Chaucer); Roman and Canon Law; History (inquisitions and other ecclesiastical trials; torture; Galileo); Theology (exorcism; heresies); and Biblical Studies (textual investigations; English Bible). Most notable is Satan: A Biography published by the Cambridge University Press in 2006. This book became an academic 'best seller' and has now been translated into six other languages (French; Italian; Greek; Portuguese; Russian; and Czech). He also published studies on heresy trials including that of Sir Thomas More, and how the English Inquisition differed from its continental counterpart. Andy's 'service' has been two major contributions to the scholarship of the Middle Ages: returning to the editorship the journal Viator: Medieval and Renaissance Studies in 2003. Viator, published by the UCLA Center for Medieval and Renaissance Studies, has an international profile for its scholarship and two generations of graduate assistants have profited from working on it. Andy also directed the digitization of the 1582 edition of Corpus Juris Canonici (Corpus of Canon Law), which is now available on-line for legal and ecclesiastic scholars worldwide."

== Selected publications ==
Books

- Divine Providence in the England of Shakespeare's Histories. Cambridge, Mass.: Harvard University Press, 1970.
- Love and Marriage in the Age of Chaucer. Ithaca: Cornell University Press, 1975.
- The Matrimonial Trials of Henry VIII. Stanford: Stanford University Press, 1976.
- The Devil at Baptism: Ritual, Theology, and Drama. Ithaca: Cornell University Press, 1985.
- Ideas and Forms of Tragedy from Aristotle to the Middle Ages. Cambridge University Studies in Medieval Literature. Cambridge: Cambridge University Press, 1993.
- Inquisitions and Other Trial Procedures in the Medieval West. Aldershot: Ashgate, 2001.
- Satan: A Biography. Cambridge: Cambridge University Press, 2006.
- The Middle English Bible: A Reassessment. Philadelphia: University of Pennsylvania Press, 2016.
- Criminal-Inquisitorial Trials in English Church Courts. The Catholic University of America Press, 2023.
- The Trial and Retrial of Joan of Arc: A Judicial Review. Palgrave Macmillan, 2026.

Articles

- "Consciousness in the Monologues of Ulysses", Modern Language Quarterly 24 (1963) 3–12.
- "Kinship, Incest, and the Dictates of Law", American Journal of Jurisprudence 14 (1969) 69–78.
- "English Kings and the Fear of Sorcery", Mediaeval Studies 39 (1977) 206–238.
- "Pronouncing Latin Words in English", Classical World 80 (1986–87) 33–37.
- "Satan the Old Enemy: A Cosmic J. Edgar Hoover", Journal of American Folklore 103 (1990) 77–84.
- "‘Rule of Thumb’ and the Folklaw of the Husband's Stick," Journal of Legal Education 44 (1994) 341-65.
- "A Neo-Revisionist Look at Chaucer's Nuns", Chaucer Review 31 (1996–97) 116–36.
- "Jews and Saracens in Chaucer's England: A Review of the Evidence", Studies in the Age of Chaucer 27 (2005) 129–69.
- "Thomas More on Inquisitorial Due Process", English Historical Review, 123 (2008) 847–94.
- "Adam Citings before the Intrusion of Satan: Recontextualizing Paul’s Theology of Sin and Death", Biblical Theology Bulletin 44 (2014) 13–28.
- "Galileo’s Non-Trial (1616), Pre-Trial (1632-33), and Trial (May 10, 1633): A Review of Procedure, Featuring Routine Violations of the Forum of Conscience", Church History 85 (2016) 724–61.
- "Luther at Augsburg, 1518: New Light on Papal Strategies", Journal of Ecclesiastical History 70 (2019) 804–22.
