= In the Shadow of Tomorrow =

1935 book by Johan Huizinga

- Author: Johan Huizinga
- Original title: In de schaduwen van morgen
- Translator: Jakob Herman Huizinga
- Language: Dutch
- Publisher: H.D. Tjeenk Willink & Zoon
- Publication date: October 1935
- Publication place: Netherlands
- English publication date: 1936
- Pages: 230

In the Shadow of Tomorrow: A Diagnosis of the Spiritual Ills of Our Time (Dutch: In de schaduwen van morgen. Een diagnose van het geestelijk lijden van onzen tijd) is a 1935 book by the Dutch writer Johan Huizinga.

== Summary ==
The book is a critical essay about Western culture under modernity. It covers issues of war, weakening social structures, decline in cultural expressions, lack of spirit and general worldweariness.

== Publication ==
The book was published by H.D. Tjeenk Willink & Zoon in Haarlem in October 1935. It appeared in English in 1936, translated by the author's son Jakob Herman Huizinga.

== Reception ==
In the Shadow of Tomorrow was widely discussed for a period and temporarily became more popular than Huizinga's The Autumn of the Middle Ages (1919). It was his best selling work but also his most criticised. The historians Jan Romein, Pieter Geyl and Henk Wesseling have criticised it for analyzing ongoing crises as results of deeper cultural issues rather than economics and politics.

The scholar Henk van den Belt groups In the Shadow of Tomorrow with José Ortega y Gasset's The Revolt of the Masses (1929) and other interwar-era books of cultural criticism that "expressed deep concerns about the prospects of the humanistic ideals held by a cultural elite to which their authors themselves invariably belonged". Looking at it in retrospect, Belt wrote that the genre "largely became obsolete" in the 1960s "as the fears it expressed turned true". Nora Gosselink similarly groups In the Shadow of Tomorrow with contemporaneous works of cultural pessimism, notably Oswald Spengler's The Decline of the West (1918–1922), whose outlook Huizinga initially had rejected but gradually came to adopt.
