= Jvf =

jvf or JVF or variation, may refer to:

- John V. Fleming (born 1936, "jvf"), U.S. literary critic
- Jaipur Virasat Foundation (JVF), founder and operator of the Jaipur Literature Festival
- Johor Volunteer Forces (JVF), element of the Royal Johor Military Force
- Jabalpur Vehicle Factory

== See also ==
- Jean Vincent Félix Lamouroux (1779–1825; J.V.F. Lamouroux), French biologist
