= Johan Huizinga =

Dutch cultural historian (1872–1945)

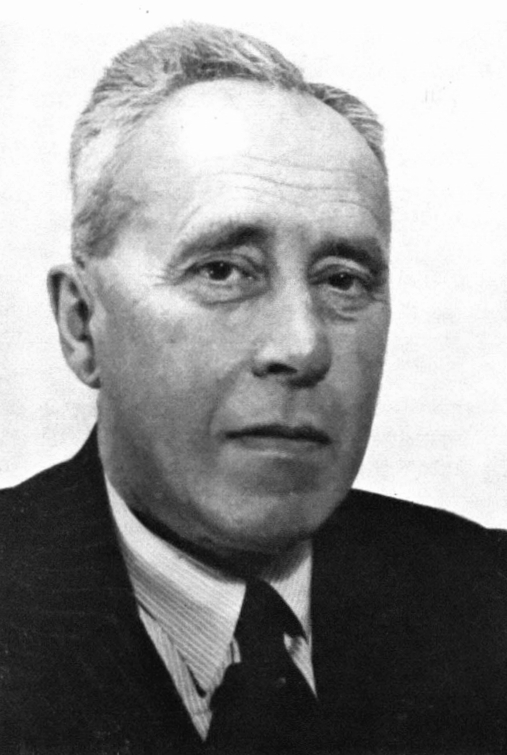
- Born: 7 December 1872; Groningen, Netherlands
- Died: 1 February 1945 (aged 72); De Steeg, Netherlands
- Occupations: Historian, professor, writer

Academic background
- Education: University of Groningen (PhD, 1897)
- Doctoral advisor: Jacob Samuel Speyer
- Influences: Jacob Burckhardt

Academic work
- Discipline: History
- Institutions: Groningen University (1905–1923); Leiden University (1915–1942)
- Notable works: The Autumn of the Middle Ages (1919); Homo Ludens (1938); Dutch Civilisation in the Seventeenth Century (1941)

Johan Huizinga (Dutch: [ˈjoːɦɑn ˈɦœyzɪŋɣaː]; 7 December 1872 – 1 February 1945) was a Dutch historian and one of the founders of modern cultural history.

== Life ==
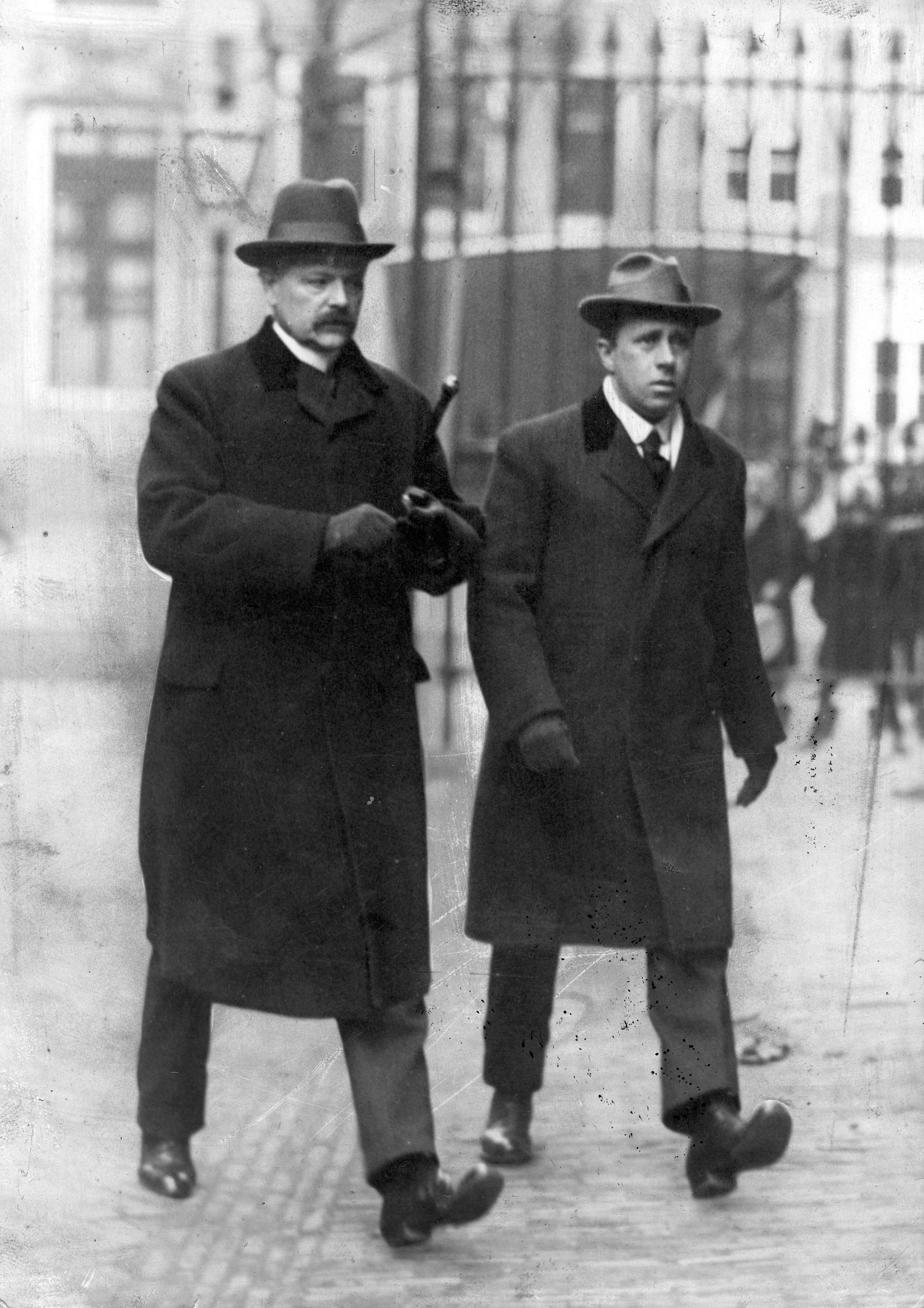
Huizinga (right) with the ethnographer A.W. Nieuwenhuis, Leiden (1917)

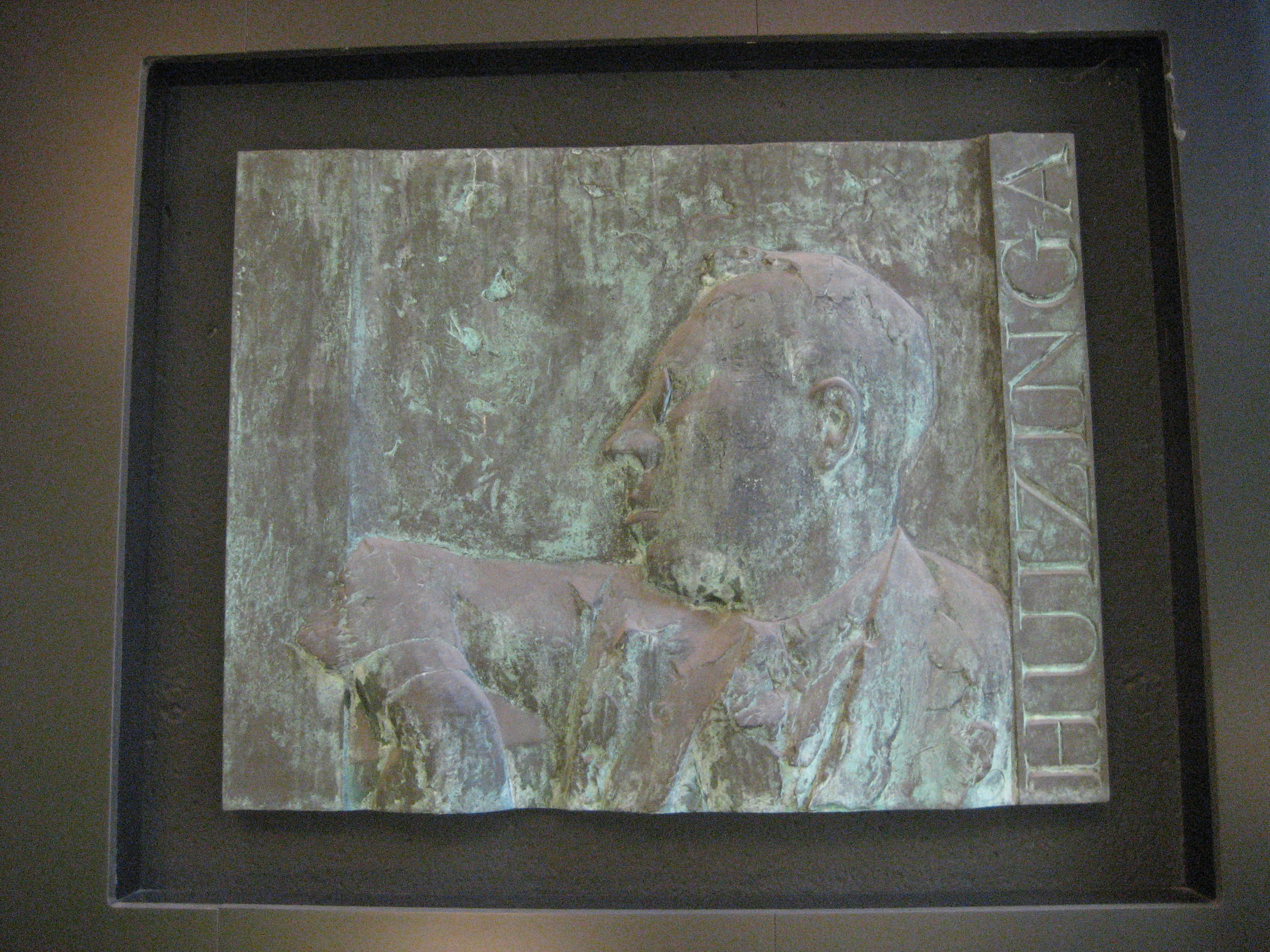
Huizinga plaque at Leiden University

Born in Groningen as the son of Dirk Huizinga, a professor of physiology, and Jacoba Tonkens, who died two years after his birth, he started out as a student of Indo-European languages, earning his degree in 1895. He then studied comparative linguistics, gaining a good command of Sanskrit. He wrote his doctoral thesis on the role of the jester in Indian drama in 1897.

In 1902 his interest turned towards medieval and Renaissance history. He continued teaching as an Orientalist until he became a Professor of General and Dutch History at Groningen University in 1905. In 1915, he was made Professor of General History at Leiden University, a post he held until 1942. In 1916 he became member of the Royal Netherlands Academy of Arts and Sciences.

In 1942, he spoke critically of his country's German occupiers, comments that were consistent with his writings about Fascism in the 1930s. He was held in detention by the Nazis between August and October 1942. Upon his release, he was banned from returning to Leiden. He subsequently lived at the house of his colleague Rudolph Cleveringa in De Steeg in Gelderland, near Arnhem, where he died just a few weeks before Nazi rule ended. He lies buried in the graveyard of the Reformed Church at 6 Haarlemmerstraatweg in Oegstgeest.

== Works ==
Huizinga had an aesthetic approach to history, where art and spectacle played an important part. His most famous work is The Autumn of the Middle Ages (also released as The Waning of the Middle Ages or Autumntide of the Middle Ages) (1919).

Other works include Erasmus (1924) and Homo Ludens (1938). In the latter book he discussed the possibility that play is the primary formative element in human culture. Huizinga also published books on American history and Dutch history in the 17th century.

Alarmed by the rise of National Socialism in Germany, Huizinga wrote several works of cultural criticism. Many similarities can be noted between his analysis and that of contemporary critics such as Ortega y Gasset and Oswald Spengler. Huizinga argued that the spirit of technical and mechanical organisation had replaced spontaneous and organic order in cultural as well as political life.

The Huizinga Lecture (Dutch: Huizingalezing) is a prestigious annual lecture in the Netherlands about a subject in the domains of cultural history or philosophy in honour of Johan Huizinga.

Johan Huizinga’s archive and papers are held by Leiden University Libraries’ Special Collections and also available in its Digital Collections. A complete inventory has been published.

== Family ==
Huizinga's son Leonhard Huizinga became a writer, including his series of tongue-in-cheek novels on the Dutch aristocratic twins Adrian and Oliver ("Adriaan en Olivier").

== Bibliography ==
- Mensch en menigte in America (1918), translated by Herbert H. Rowen as America; A Dutch historian's vision, from afar and near (Part 1) (Harper & Row, 1972)
- Herfsttij der Middeleeuwen (1919), translated as Herbst des Mittelalters by Mathilde Wolff-Mönckeberg (1924), The Waning of the Middle Ages (1924), as The Autumn of the Middle Ages (1996) and as Autumntide of the Middle Ages by Diane Webb (2020)
- Erasmus of Rotterdam (1924), translated by Frederik Hopman as Erasmus and the Age of Reformation (1924)
- Amerika Levend en Denkend (1926), translated by Herbert H. Rowen as America: A Dutch Historian's Vision, from Afar and Near (Part 2) (Harper & Row, 1972)
- Leven en werk van Jan Veth (1927)
- Cultuurhistorische verkenningen (1929)
- In de schaduwen van morgen (1935), translated by his son Jacob Herman Huizinga as In the Shadow of Tomorrow
- De wetenschap der geschiedenis (1937)
- Geschonden wereld (1946, published posthumously)
- Homo Ludens. Proeve eener bepaling van het spel-element der cultuur (1938), translated as Homo Ludens, a study of the play element in culture (1955)
- Nederland's beschaving in de zeventiende eeuw (1941). Translated by Arnold Pomerans as Dutch civilisation in the seventeenth century (1968)
- “Patriotism and Nationalism in European History”. In: Men and Ideas. History, the Middle Ages, the Renaissance. Transl. by James S. Holmes and Hans van Marle. New York: Meridian Books, 1959.
- Men and ideas. History, the Middle Ages, the Renaissance. Essays (1959). Translations by James S. Holmes and Hans van Marle of parts of Huizinga's Collected Works

== See also ==
- Courtly love
- C. S. Lewis and his The Allegory of Love
- D. W. Robertson Jr.
