= Mathilde Wolff-Mönckeberg =

German-born writer and translator

Mathilde Wolff-Mönckeberg (1879 – 1958), also known as Tilli, was a German-born writer and translator. She was the seventh child of Johann Georg Mönckeberg, a lawyer and Lord Mayor of Hamburg.

After her education at school in Hamburg, she travelled to Florence for further study, where in 1900 she stayed with Aby Warburg and Mary Warburg. She married the Dutch art historian André Jolles (1874–1946) on 8 September 1900 and together they had five children (Hendrik (d.1902), Hendrika, Jacoba, Jan, Otto, Ruth). They moved to Freiburg in 1902 and Berlin in 1909 where Mathilde worked as a translator, before their divorce on 26 July 1918.

She then returned to Hamburg and in 1923–4, she published a German translation (entitled Herbst des Mittelalters) of the Dutch cultural historian Johan Huizinga's Herfsttij der Middeleeuwen (1919), (English translation The Autumn of the Middle Ages (1996)).

In 1925, she married Emil Wolff, a Professor of English and Rector of Hamburg University. During the war she wrote a series of unsent letters describing life in Hamburg at this time to her children who were living abroad. These were edited and translated as On the Other Side: Letters to My Children from Germany, 1940–1945 by her daughter Ruth Evans in the 1970s (published 1979, London: Peter Owen, republished in 2007 by Persephone Books).

== See also ==
- André Jolles
- Emil Wolff
