= The Civilization of the Renaissance in Italy =

1860 history book by Jacob Burckhardt

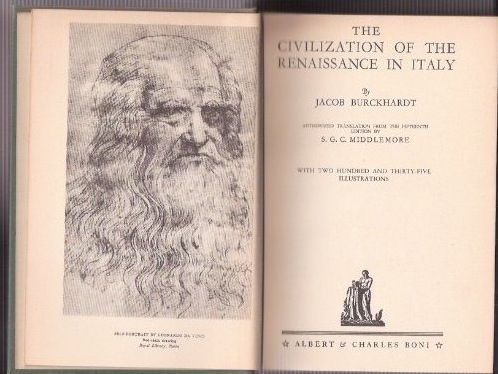
- The title page of an English translation
- Author: Jacob Burckhardt
- Original title: Die Cultur ^{a} der Renaissance in Italien
- Translator: S. G. C. Middlemore
- Language: German
- Publisher: Schweighauser'sche Verlagsbuchhandlung
- Publication place: Switzerland

The Civilization of the Renaissance in Italy (German: Die Cultur der Renaissance in Italien) is an 1860 work on the Italian Renaissance by Swiss historian Jacob Burckhardt. Together with his History of the Renaissance in Italy (Die Geschichte der Renaissance in Italien; 1867) it is counted among the classics of Renaissance historiography. An English translation was produced by S.G.C. Middlemore in two volumes, London 1878.

== Content ==
According to Denys Hay:

Burckhardt sought to capture and define the spirit of the age in all its main manifestations. For him ‘’Kultur’’ was the whole picture: politics, manners, religion...the character that animated the particular activities of a people in a given epoch, and of which pictures, buildings, social and political habits, literature, are the concrete expressions.

Its scholarly judgements are considered to have been largely justified by subsequent research according to historians including Desmond Seward and art historians such as Kenneth Clark.

The Civilization of the Renaissance in Italy is divided into six parts:

1. Part One: The State as a Work of Art
2. Part Two: The Development of the Individual
3. Part Three: The Revival of Antiquity
4. Part Four: The Discovery of the World and of Man
5. Part Five: Society and Festivals
6. Part Six: Morality and Religion

== Editions ==
- 1878. The Civilization of the Renaissance in Italy.
- 1990. The Civilization of the Renaissance in Italy. Penguin Classics. ISBN 0-14-044534-X

== See also ==
- The Autumn of the Middle Ages
- A Distant Mirror
