= Katherine Elizabeth Fleming =

American historian

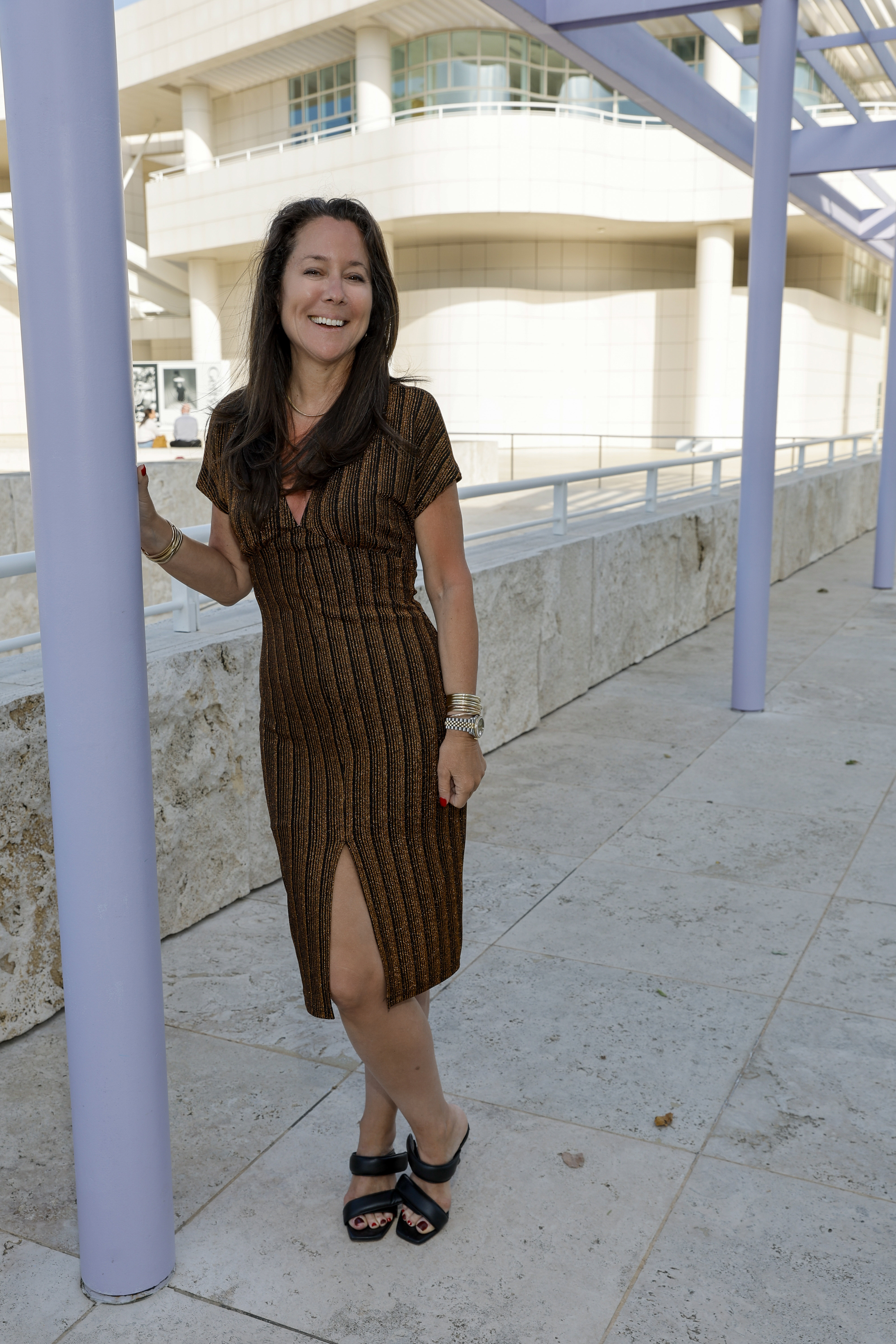
Katherine Elizabeth Fleming at the Getty Museum in 2023

Katherine Elizabeth Fleming is President and CEO of the J. Paul Getty Trust and the Alexander S. Onassis Professor of Hellenic Culture and Civilization in the Department of History at New York University (NYU) as well as Provost Emerita of the university. She was Provost of NYU from 2016 to 2022.

Due to her influence, she is regarded as one of the most significant figures in the art world, and has been referred to as the most influential woman in American art and culture.

== Career ==
Fleming holds a certificate in Theology from King's College London (1985), a BA from Barnard College of Columbia University (1988), an MA from the University of Chicago (1989), and a PhD (1995) from the University of California, Berkeley.

She specializes in the modern history of Greece and the broader Mediterranean.

Fleming was the second director (after Tony R. Judt) of the Remarque Institute. Fleming was associate director of the institute from 2002 until Judt's death in 2010.

Fleming has been longterm associate member of the faculty of the department of history of the École Normale Supérieure in Paris, where she ran a multi-year workshop on the history of the Mediterranean with the French historian of Italy, Gilles Pécout. Fleming was in residence at the École Normale from 2007 to 2011, although she retained her positions at NYU.

Fleming was the co-founder and co-director (with Sofia Papaioannou) of "Istorima," a large-scale oral history/public humanities project in Greece funded by the Stavros Niarchos Foundation.

Fleming was President of the board of the University of Piraeus in Piraeus, Greece from 2012 to 2016. She is an appointee to the Administrative Board of the Chancellerie des Universités de Paris; member of the Conseil Scientifique of the Bibliothèque Nationale de France; board member of the ALIPH Foundation; Executive Board member of the John S. Latsis Public Benefit Foundation; Trustee of Barnard College of Columbia University; Director at Time Partners, an independent private markets advisory firm based in London; Director at AudioEye (AEYE), and Independent Director at Accor. Fleming has served on numerous editorial boards.

The Getty's joint acquisition with the National Portrait Gallery, London of "Portrait of Mai (Omai)" by Sir Joshua Reynolds was announced as "Acquisition of the Year" for 2023 by Apollo Magazine.

During the Palisades Fire of January 2025, there was significant international media interest in the Getty Villa and its survival, with Fleming and her team gaining attention for their safety protocols and round-the-clock attentiveness to the security of the site, staff, and collections.

== Honors ==
=== France ===
- Légion d'Honneur - Chevalier, 2019
- Ordre des Arts et des Lettres - Commandeur, 2024

=== Greece ===
- Order of Beneficence - Commander, 2022

=== Other Honors ===
In 2015, the government of Greece recognized Fleming's contributions to Greek culture by granting her Greek citizenship. The University of Macedonia, Neapolis University Paphos Cyprus, Ionian University and the Universitatea Creştina Dimitrie Cantemire have also extended her honorary doctorates.

In 2021, Fleming was elected Fellow of the American Academy of Arts and Sciences. In 2026, Fleming was elected member of the Academia Europaea.

== Published works ==
=== Books ===
Fleming's first book, The Muslim Bonaparte: Diplomacy & Orientalism in Ali Pasha's Greece (Princeton, 1999), is a standard of doctoral reading lists in cultural history and the history of southeastern Europe, and has been translated into Albanian, Greek, Italian, and Turkish. The Greek edition was widely reviewed and covered in the popular press.

Fleming's second book, Greece: A Jewish History (Princeton, 2008), received numerous awards: a National Jewish Book Award; the Runciman Award; the Prix Alberto Benveniste; and honorable mention, Keeley Book Prize of the Modern Greek Studies Association and received considerable popular press in Greece. It has been translated into Greek and French. In the English-speaking academy the book has been widely and largely positively reviewed, though some reviewers have objected to its "anti-Zionist" and "diasporist" approach, which minimizes and to an extent rejects the centrality of Israel and of Zionism.

Fleming is co-editor, with Adnan Husain, of A Faithful Sea: The Religious Cultures of the Mediterranean 1200–1700 (Oxford OneWorld, 2007).

=== Other publications ===
Fleming has authored numerous articles, chapters, and encyclopedia entries, of which the most cited is "Orientalism, the Balkans, and Balkan Historiography", published in the American Historical Review in 2000.

In 2009, the journal Nationalities Papers printed an apology and retraction after it published an article that made extensive use of Fleming's work without citation or reference (Alice Curticapean, "Are you Hungarian or Romanian?" in Nationalities Papers, Volume 35, No. 3, pp. 411–427; retraction printed Volume 37, No. 4).

Fleming is a prolific book reviewer, and has published over one hundred reviews in both academic and popular publications.

== Family ==
Fleming is the daughter of the American literary critic John V. Fleming and of the British-born Reverend Canon Joan Elizabeth Fleming, a prominent priest in the Episcopal diocese of New Jersey and Rector Emerita of Christ Church parish, New Brunswick.

She has two brothers, Richard Arthur Fleming, a travel writer; and Luke Owles Fleming, a linguistic anthropologist.

She is the mother of three daughters.
