= Courtly love =

Medieval European literary conception of love

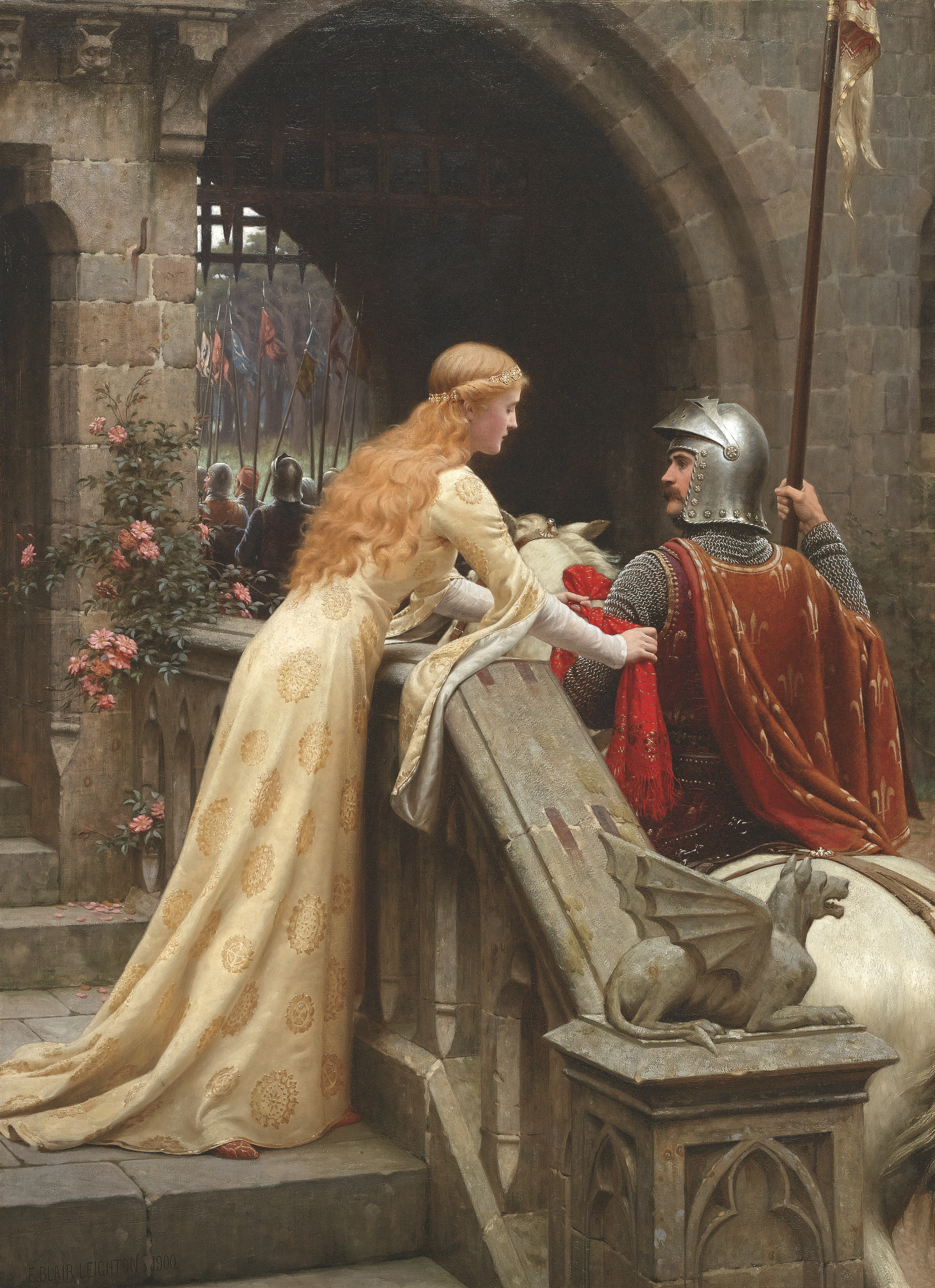
God Speed by Edmund Blair Leighton, 1900: a late Victorian view of a lady giving a favor to a knight about to go into battle

Courtly love (Occitan: fin'amor [finaˈmuɾ]; French: amour courtois [amuʁ kuʁtwa]) was a medieval European literary conception of love that emphasized nobility and chivalry. Medieval literature is filled with examples of knights setting out on adventures and performing various deeds or services for ladies because of their "courtly love". This kind of love was originally a literary fiction created for the entertainment of the nobility, but as time passed, these ideas about love spread to popular culture and attracted a larger literate audience. In the High Middle Ages, a "game of love" developed around these ideas as a set of social practices. "Loving nobly" was considered to be an enriching and improving practice.

Courtly love began in the ducal and princely courts of Aquitaine, Provence, Champagne, ducal Burgundy and the Norman Kingdom of Sicily at the end of the eleventh century. In essence, courtly love was an experience between erotic desire and spiritual attainment, "a love at once illicit and morally elevating, passionate and disciplined, humiliating and exalting, human and transcendent". The topic was prominent with both musicians and poets, being frequently used by troubadours, trouvères and Minnesänger. The topic was also popular with major writers, including Dante, Petrarch and Geoffrey Chaucer.

== Origin of term ==
=== Contemporary usage ===
The term "courtly love" appears in only one extant source: Provençal cortez amors in a late 12th-century poem by Peire d'Alvernhe.

It is associated with the Provençal term fin'amor ("fine love") which appears frequently in poetry, as well as its German translation hohe Minne. Provençal also uses the terms verai'amors, bon'amors.

=== Modern usage ===
← / Gaston Paris; ← / Lewis Freeman Mott; ← / William Allan Neilson; ← / Alfred Jeanroy; ← / C. S. Lewis
Formation of the modern usage of the term

The modern use of the term "courtly love" comes from Gaston Paris. He used the term amour courtois ("courtly love") in a 1883 article discussing the relationship between Lancelot and Guinevere in Chrétien de Troyes's Lancelot, the Knight of the Cart (c. 1181). In his article, Paris outlined four principal characteristics of amour courtois:

1. The love is illegitimate, furtive (ie. adulterous).
2. The male lover is in an inferior position and the woman in an elevated one.
3. The man does quests, tests, or trials in the woman's name.
4. There is an art to it, it has rules, in the same vein as chivalry or courtesy.

Paris used it as a descriptive phrase, not a technical term, and used it interchangeably with the phrase amour chevaleresque. Nonetheless, other scholars began using it as a technical term after him.

In 1896, Lewis Freeman Mott applied the term "courtly love" to Dante Alighieri's love for Beatrice in La Vita Nuova (1294). The two relationships are very different — Lancelot and Guinevere are secret adulterous lovers, while Dante and Beatrice had no actual romantic relationship and only met twice in their whole lives. Nonetheless, the manner in which the two men describe their devotion to and quasi-religious adoration of their ladies is similar.

In 1936, C. S. Lewis wrote The Allegory of Love which popularized the term "courtly love". He defined it as a "love of a highly specialized sort, whose characteristics may be enumerated as Humility, Courtesy, Adultery, and the Religion of Love".

In 1964, Moshe Lazar differentiated three separate categories within "courtly love".

==== Criticism ====
Scholars debate whether "courtly love" constitutes a coherent idea.

D. W. Robertson Jr. said, "the connotations of the term courtly love are so vague and flexible that its utility for purposes of definition has become questionable." John C. Moore called it "a term used for a number of different, in some cases contradictory, conceptions" and called it "a mischievous term which should be abandoned". Roger Boase admitted the term "has been subjected to a bewildering variety of uses and definitions", but nonetheless defended the concept of courtly love as real and useful.

E. Talbot Donaldson criticized its usage as a technical term as an anachronism or neologism.

Richard Trachsler says that "the concept of courtly literature is linked to the idea of the existence of courtly texts, texts produced and read by men and women sharing some kind of elaborate culture they all have in common". He argues that many of the texts that scholars claim to be courtly also include "uncourtly" texts, and argues that there is no clear way to determine "where courtliness ends and uncourtliness starts" because readers would enjoy texts which were supposed to be entirely courtly without realizing they were also enjoying texts which were uncourtly. This presents a clear problem in the understanding of courtliness.

Irving Singer comments on whether the concept is tenable, stating "I am convinced that the definition of courtly love formulated by Paris and Lewis is very misleading. But rather than eliminate the term from scholarly discourse, I think it is wiser merely to redefine the concept in a way that will accommodate the great diversity of attitudes toward love in the Middle Ages."

Singer summarizes a revised version of the concept as the following cluster of ideas—which often appear together, but are not necessarily present in any given author of the period:

1. sexual love between men and women is in itself something splendid, an ideal worth striving for;
2. love ennobles both the lover and the beloved;
3. being an ethical and aesthetic attainment, sexual love cannot be reduced to mere libidinal impulse;
4. love pertains to courtesy and courtship but is not necessarily related to the institution of marriage;
5. love is an intense, passionate relationship that establishes a holy oneness between man and woman.

== History ==
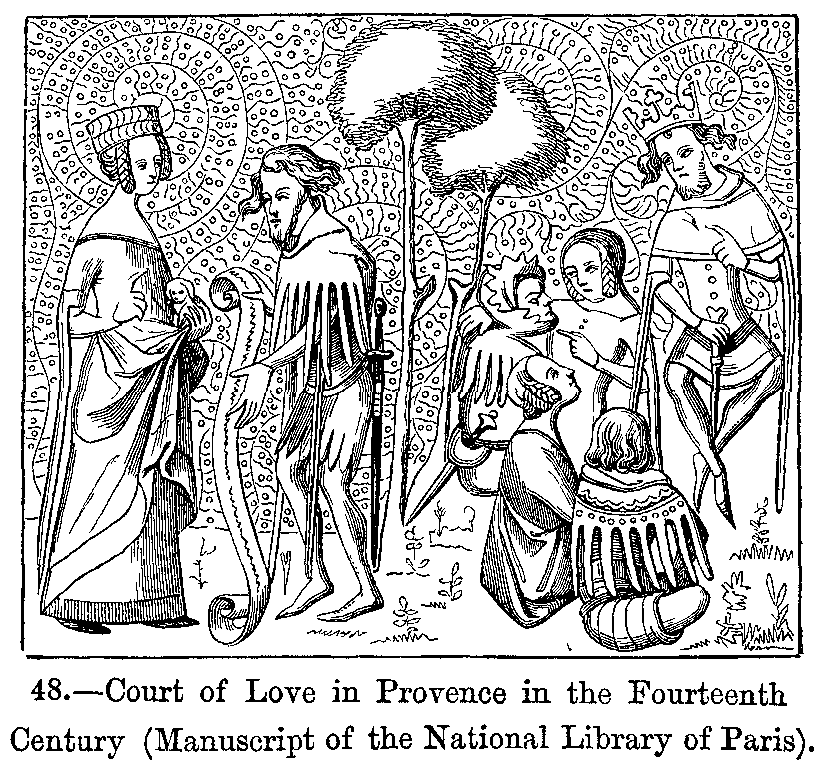
Court of Love in Provence in the 14th century (after a manuscript in the Bibliothèque Nationale, Paris)

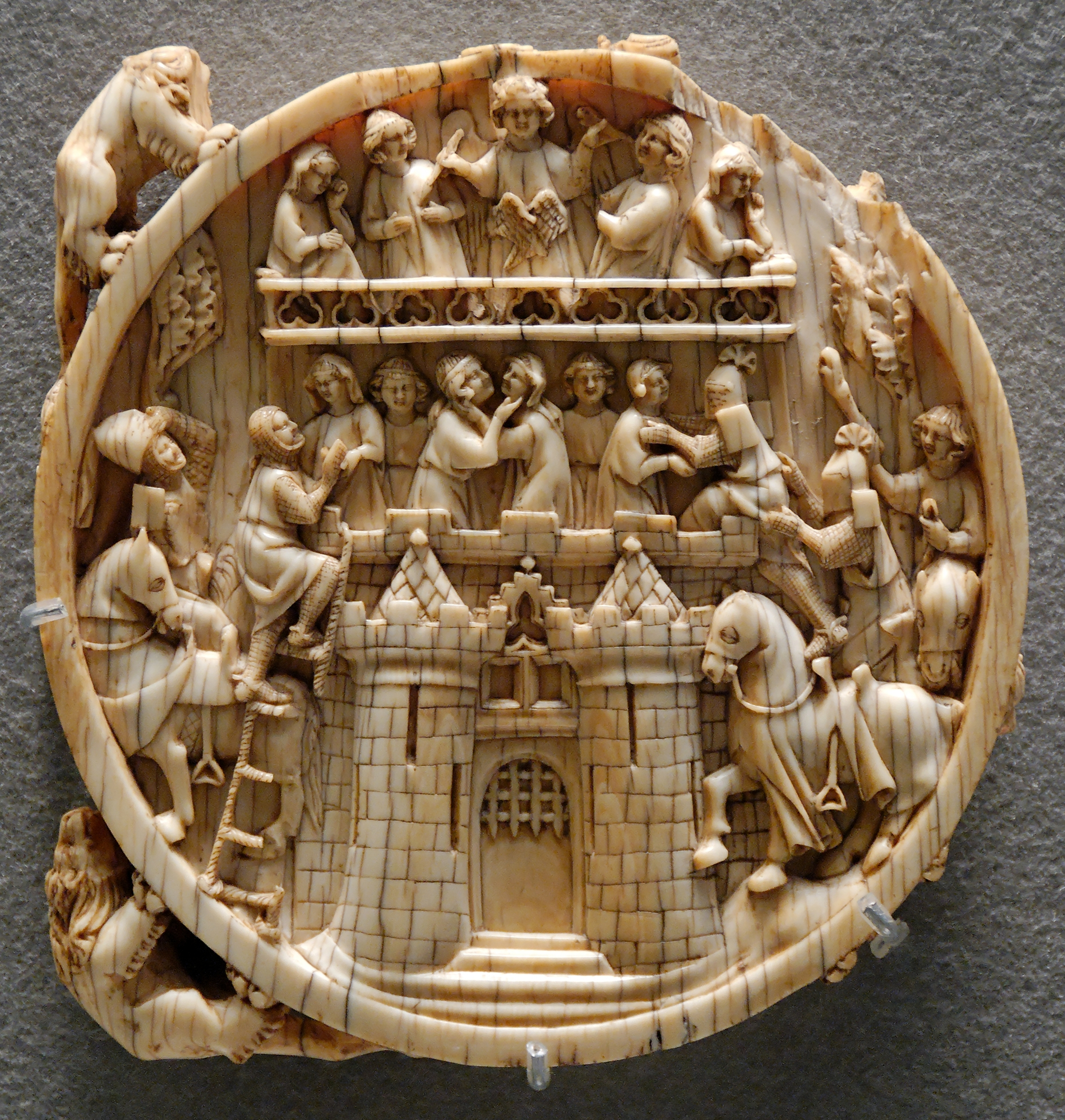
Warfare imagery: the Siege of the Castle of Love on an ivory mirror-back, possibly Paris, c. 1350–1370 (Musée du Louvre)

The practice of courtly love developed in the castle life of four regions: Aquitaine, Provence, Champagne and ducal Burgundy, from around the time of the First Crusade (1099). Eleanor of Aquitaine (1124–1204) brought ideals of courtly love from Aquitaine first to the court of France, then to England (she became queen-consort in each of these two realms in succession). Her daughter Marie, Countess of Champagne (1145–1198) brought courtly behavior to the Count of Champagne's court. Courtly love found expression in the lyric poems written by troubadours, such as William IX, Duke of Aquitaine (1071–1126), one of the first troubadour poets.

Poets adopted the terminology of feudalism, declaring themselves the vassal of the lady. The troubadour's model of the ideal lady was the wife of his employer or lord, a lady of higher status, usually the rich and powerful female head of the castle. When her husband was away on Crusade or elsewhere she dominated the household and cultural affairs; sometimes this was the case even when the husband was at home. The poet gave voice to the aspirations of the courtier class, for only those who were noble could engage in courtly love. This new kind of love saw nobility not based on wealth and family history, but on character and actions; such as devotion, piety, gallantry, thus appealing to poorer knights who saw an avenue for advancement.

By the late 12th century Andreas Capellanus' highly influential work De amore had codified the rules of courtly love. De amore lists such rules as:

- "Marriage is no real excuse for not loving."
- "He who is not jealous cannot love."
- "No one can be bound by a double love."
- "When made public love rarely endures."

Much of its structure and its sentiments derived from Ovid's Ars amatoria.

=== Andalusian and Islamic influence ===
One theory holds that courtly love in Southern France was influenced by Arabic poetry in Al-Andalus.

In contemporary Andalusian writing, Ṭawq al-Ḥamāmah (The Ring of the Dove) by Ibn Hazm is a treatise on love which emphasizes restraint and chastity. Tarjumān al-Ashwāq (The Translator of Desires) by Ibn Arabi is a collection of love poetry. Outside of Al-Andalus, Kitab al-Zahra (Book of the Flower) by Ibn Dawud and Risala fi'l-Ishq (Treatise of Love) by Ibn Sina are roughly contemporary treaties on love. Ibn Arabi and Ibn Sina both weave together themes of sensual love with divine love.

According to Gustave E. von Grunebaum, notions of "love for love's sake" and "exaltation of the beloved lady" can be traced back to Arabic literature of the 9th and 10th centuries. The ennobling power of love is overtly discussed in Risala fi'l-Ishq.

According to an argument outlined by María Rosa Menocal in The Arabic Role in Medieval Literary History (1987), in 11th-century Spain, a group of wandering poets appeared who would go from court to court, and sometimes travel to Christian courts in southern France, a situation closely mirroring what would happen in southern France about a century later. Contacts between these Spanish poets and the French troubadours were frequent. The metrical forms used by the Spanish poets resembled those later used by the troubadours.

== Analysis ==
The historic analysis of courtly love varies between different schools of historians. That sort of history which views the early Middle Ages dominated by a prudish and patriarchal theocracy views courtly love as a "humanist" reaction to the puritanical views of the Catholic Church. (Note: This analysis is heavily informed by the Chivalric–Matriarchal reading of courtly love, put forth by critics such as Thomas Warton and Karl Vossler. This theory considers courtly love as the intersection between the theocratic Catholic Church and "Germanic/Celtic/Pictish" matriarchy. For more on this theory, see Boase 1977, p. 75.) Scholars who endorse this view value courtly love for its exaltation of femininity as an ennobling, spiritual, and moral force, in contrast to the ironclad chauvinism of the first and second estates. The condemnation of courtly love in the beginning of the 13th century by the church as heretical, is seen by these scholars as the Church's attempt to put down this "sexual rebellion".

However, other scholars note that courtly love was certainly tied to the Church's effort to civilize the crude Germanic feudal codes in the late 11th century. It has also been suggested that the prevalence of arranged marriages required other outlets for the expression of more personal occurrences of romantic love, and thus it was not in reaction to the prudery or patriarchy of the Church but to the nuptial customs of the era that courtly love arose. In the Germanic cultural world, a special form of courtly love can be found, namely Minne.

At times, the lady could be a princesse lointaine, a far-away princess, and some tales told of men who had fallen in love with women whom they had never seen, merely on hearing their perfection described, but normally she was not so distant. As the etiquette of courtly love became more complicated, the knight might wear the colors of his lady: where blue or black were sometimes the colors of faithfulness, green could be a sign of unfaithfulness. Salvation, previously found in the hands of the priesthood, now came from the hands of one's lady. In some cases, there were also women troubadours who expressed the same sentiment for men.

== Literary convention ==
In you reside the flowers and the verdure,
And that which glows or is beautiful to see,
Your face is more resplendent than the sun,
Who sees you not can never value aught.

In this world there is no creature
So full of beauty or of pleasure,
And he who dreaded love is reassured
By your loveliness and can no longer fear.

The ladies who make up your retinue
Please me merely through your love of them,
And I beseech them, in their courtliness,

That those who can should honor you still more
And venerate your true supremacy,
Since of all women you remain the best.

— Guido Cavalcanti (Note: According to Irving Singer, "The entire tradition of French courtly love is summed up, distilled, and clarified in a poem such as this" by Cavalcanti.)

The literary convention of courtly love can be found in most of the major authors of the Middle Ages, such as Geoffrey Chaucer, John Gower, Dante, Marie de France, Chretien de Troyes, Gottfried von Strassburg and Thomas Malory. The medieval genres in which courtly love conventions can be found include the lyric, the romance and the allegory.

=== Lyric ===
Courtly love was born in the lyric, first appearing with Provençal poets in the 11th century, including itinerant and courtly minstrels such as the French troubadours and trouvères, as well as the writers of lays. Texts about courtly love, including lays, were often set to music by troubadours or minstrels. According to scholar Ardis Butterfield, courtly love is "the air which many genres of troubadour song breathe".

It is difficult to know how and when these songs were performed because most of the information on these topics is provided in the music itself. One lay, the "Lay of Lecheor", says that after a lay was composed, "Then the lay was preserved / Until it was known everywhere / For those who were skilled musicians / On viol, harp and rote / Carried it forth from that region…" Scholars have to then decide whether to take this description as truth or fiction.

Period examples of performance practice, of which there are few, show a quiet scene with a household servant performing for the king or lord and a few other people, usually unaccompanied. According to scholar Christopher Page, whether or not a piece was accompanied depended on the availability of instruments and people to accompany—in a courtly setting. For troubadours or minstrels, pieces were often accompanied by fiddle, also called a vielle, or a harp. Courtly musicians also played the vielle and the harp, as well as different types of viols and flutes.

This French tradition spread later to the German Minnesänger, such as Walther von der Vogelweide and Wolfram von Eschenbach, and to the troubadours of the Iberian peninsula, see Galician-Portuguese lyric. It also influenced the Sicilian School of Italian vernacular poetry, as well as Petrarch and Dante.

=== Romance ===
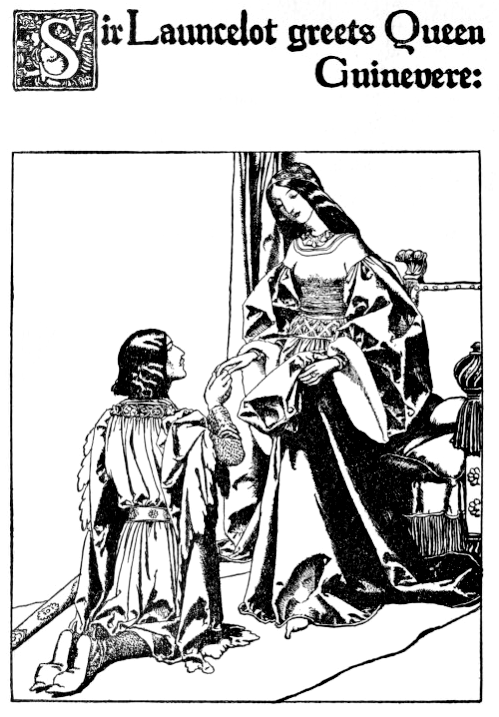
Lancelot and Guinevere in Howard Pyle's illustration for The Story of the Champions of the Round Table (1905)

The vernacular poetry of the romans courtois, or courtly romances, included many examples of courtly love. Some of them are set within the cycle of poems celebrating King Arthur's court. This was a literature of leisure, directed to a largely female audience for the first time in European history.

=== Allegory ===
Allegory is common in the romantic literature of the Middle Ages, and it was often used to interpret what was already written. There is a strong connection between religious imagery and human sexual love in medieval writings.

The tradition of medieval allegory began in part with the interpretation of the Song of Songs in the Bible. Some medieval writers thought that the book should be taken literally as an erotic text; others believed that the Song of Songs was a metaphor for the relationship between Christ and the church and that the book could not even exist without that as its metaphorical meaning. Still others claimed that the book was written literally about sex but that this meaning must be "superseded by meanings related to Christ, to the church and to the individual Christian soul".

Marie de France's lai "Eliduc" toys with the idea that human romantic love is a symbol for God's love when two people love each other so fully and completely that they leave each other for God, separating and moving to different religious environments. Furthermore, the main character's first wife leaves her husband and becomes a nun so that he can marry his new lover.

Allegorical treatment of courtly love is also found in the Roman de la Rose by Guillaume de Lorris and Jean de Meun. In it, a man becomes enamored with an individual rose on a rosebush, attempting to pick it and finally succeeding. The rose represents the female body, but the romance also contains lengthy digressive "discussions on free will versus determinism as well as on optics and the influence of heavenly bodies on human behavior".

=== Midons ===
Courtly love in troubadour poetry is associated with the word midons. Midons comes from the Latin phrase "my lord", mihi dominus. The mi part is alternatively interpreted as coming from meus or mia, though the meaning is unchanged regardless.

Troubadours beginning with Guilhem de Poitou would address the lady as midons, flattering her by addressing her as his lord and also serving as an ambiguous code-name.

By refusing to disclose his lady's name, the troubadour permitted every woman in the audience, notably the patron's wife, to think that it was she; then, besides making her the object of a secret passion—it was always covert romance—by making her his lord he flashed her an aggrandized image of herself. She was more than "just" a woman: She was a man.

— Meg Bogin

These points of multiple meaning and ambiguity facilitated a "coquetry of class", allowing the male troubadours to use the images of women as a means to gain social status with other men, but simultaneously, Bogin suggests, voiced deeper longings for the audience: "In this way, the sexual expressed the social and the social the sexual; and in the poetry of courtly love the static hierarchy of feudalism was uprooted and transformed to express a world of motion and transformation."

=== Later influence ===
Through such routes as Capellanus's record of the Courts of Love and the later works of Petrarchism (as well as the continuing influence of Ovid), the themes of courtly love were not confined to the medieval, but appear both in serious and comic forms in early modern Europe. Shakespeare's Romeo and Juliet, for example, shows Romeo attempting to love Rosaline in an almost contrived courtly fashion while Mercutio mocks him for it; and both in his plays and his sonnets the writer can be seen appropriating the conventions of courtly love for his own ends.

Paul Gallico's 1939 novel The Adventures of Hiram Holliday depicts a Romantic modern American consciously seeking to model himself on the ideal medieval knight. Among other things, when finding himself in Austria in the aftermath of the Anschluss, he saves a Habsburg princess who is threatened by the Nazis, acts towards her in strict accordance with the maxims of courtly love and finally wins her after fighting a duel with her aristocratic betrothed.

== Points of controversy ==
=== Sexuality ===
A point of ongoing controversy about courtly love is to what extent it was sexual. All courtly love was erotic to some degree, and not purely platonic—the troubadours speak of the physical beauty of their ladies and the feelings and desires the ladies arouse in them. However, it is unclear what a poet should do: live a life of perpetual desire channeling his energies to higher ends, or physically consummate. Scholars have seen it both ways.

Denis de Rougemont said that the troubadours were influenced by Cathar doctrines which rejected the pleasures of the flesh and that they were metaphorically addressing the spirit and soul of their ladies. Rougemont also said that courtly love subscribed to the code of chivalry, and therefore a knight's loyalty was always to his king before his mistress. Edmund Reiss claimed it was also a spiritual love, but a love that had more in common with Christian love, or caritas. On the other hand, scholars such as Mosché Lazar claim it was adulterous sexual love, with physical possession of the lady the desired end.

Many scholars identify courtly love as the "pure love" described in 1184 by Capellanus in De amore:

It is the pure love which binds together the hearts of two lovers with every feeling of delight. This kind consists in the contemplation of the mind and the affection of the heart; it goes as far as the kiss and the embrace and the modest contact with the nude lover, omitting the final solace, for that is not permitted for those who wish to love purely.... That is called mixed love which gets its effect from every delight of the flesh and culminates in the final act of Venus.

On the other hand, continual references to beds and sleeping in the lover's arms in medieval sources such as the troubadour albas and romances such as Chrétien's Lancelot imply at least in some cases a context of actual sexual intercourse.

Within the corpus of troubadour poems there is a wide range of attitudes, even across the works of individual poets. Some poems are physically sensual, even bawdily imagining nude embraces, while others are highly spiritual and border on the platonic.

=== Real-world practice ===
A continued point of controversy is whether courtly love was purely literary or was actually practiced in real life. There are no historical records that offer evidence of its presence in reality. Historian John F. Benton found no documentary evidence in law codes, court cases, chronicles or other historical documents. However, the existence of the non-fiction genre of courtesy books is perhaps evidence for its practice. For example, according to Christine de Pizan's courtesy book Book of the Three Virtues (c. 1405), which expresses disapproval of courtly love, the convention was being used to justify and cover up illicit love affairs. Philip le Bon, in his Feast of the Pheasant in 1454, relied on parables drawn from courtly love to incite his nobles to swear to participate in an anticipated crusade, while well into the 15th century numerous actual political and social conventions were largely based on the formulas dictated by the "rules" of courtly love.

=== Courts of love ===
A point of controversy was the existence of "courts of love", first mentioned by Andreas Capellanus. These were supposed courts made up of tribunals staffed by 10 to 70 women who would hear a case of love and rule on it based on the rules of love. In the 19th century, historians took the existence of these courts as fact, but later historians such as Benton noted "none of the abundant letters, chronicles, songs and pious dedications" suggest they ever existed outside of the poetic literature. Likewise, feminist historian Emily James Putnam wrote in 1910 that, secrecy being "among the lover's first duties" in the ideology of courtly love, it is "manifestly absurd to suppose that a sentiment which depended on concealment for its existence should be amenable to public inquiry". According to Diane Bornstein, one way to reconcile the differences between the references to courts of love in the literature, and the lack of documentary evidence in real life, is that they were like literary salons or social gatherings, where people read poems, debated questions of love, and played word games of flirtation.

=== Courtly love as a response to religion ===
Theologians of the time emphasized love as more of a spiritual rather than sexual connection. There is a possibility that writings about courtly love were made as a response to the theological ideas about love. Many scholars believe that Andreas Capellanus' work De amore was a satire poking fun at doctors and theologians. In that work, Capellanus is supposedly writing to a young man named Walter, and he spends the first two books telling him how to achieve love and setting forth the rules of love. However, in the third book he tells Walter that the only way to live his life correctly is to shun love in favor of God. This sudden change is what has sparked the interest of many scholars, leading some to regard the first two books as satirizing courtly love and only the third book as expressing Capellanus' actual beliefs.

== Stages ==
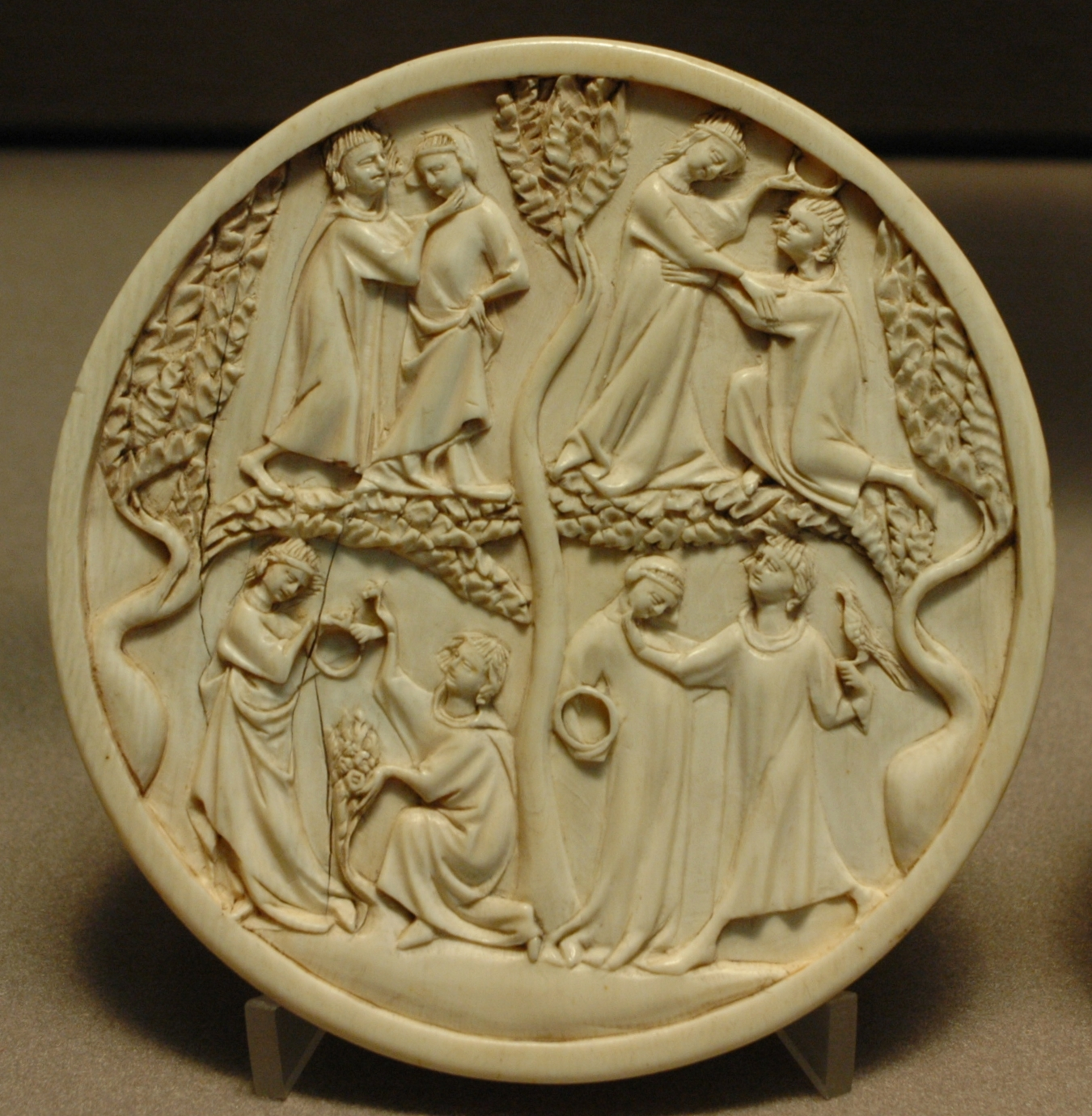
Courtly vignettes on an ivory mirror-case, first third of the 14th century (Musée du Louvre)

(Adapted from Barbara W. Tuchman)

- Attraction to the lady, usually via eyes/glance
- Worship of the lady from afar
- Declaration of passionate devotion
- Virtuous rejection by the lady
- Renewed wooing with oaths of virtue and eternal fealty
- Moans of approaching death from unsatisfied desire (and other physical manifestations of lovesickness)
- Heroic deeds of valor which win the lady's heart
- Consummation of the secret love
- Endless adventures and subterfuges avoiding detection

== See also ==
- Cicisbeo
- Domnei
- Dulcinea

== Sources ==
=== Scholarship ===
- Boase, Roger (1977). The Origin and Meaning of Courtly Love. Manchester: Manchester University Press. ISBN 0-7190-0656-2.
- Boase, Roger; Bornstein, Diane (1983). "Courtly Love". Dictionary of the Middle Ages. Vol. 3. pp. 667–674.
- Bogin, Meg (1980). "Courtly Love: A New Interpretation". The Women Troubadours. New York: W.W. Norton & Company, Inc. ISBN 0-393-00965-3.
- Donaldson, E. Talbot (1970). "The Myth of Courtly Love". Speaking of Chaucer. New York: Norton. pp. 154–163.
- Grunebaum, G. E. von (1952). "Avicenna's Risâla Fîʾl-ʿišq and Courtly Love". Journal of Near Eastern Studies. 11 (4): 233–238. doi:10.1086/371098. JSTOR 542686.
- Jeanroy, Alfred (1934). La poésie lyrique des troubadours [The lyrical poetry of the troubadours] (in French).
- Lazar, Moshe (1964). Amour courtois et "fin'amors" dans le littérature du XII siècle [Courtly love and "fin'amors" in 12th century literature] (in French). Librairie C. Klincksieck.
- Lewis, C. S. (1936). "Courtly Love". The Allegory of Love: A Study in Medieval Tradition. Oxford: Clarendon Press. ISBN 0-19-281220-3.
- Menocal, María Rosa (1987). The Arabic Role in Medieval Literary History: A Forgotten Heritage. Philadelphia: University of Pennsylvania Press. ISBN 9780812213249. JSTOR j.ctt3fhrf7.
- Monson, Don A. (2007). "The Problem of 'Midons' Revisited". Romania. 125 (499/500 (3/4)): 283–305. doi:10.3406/roma.2007.1404. JSTOR 45039194.
- Moore, John C. (October 1979). "'Courtly Love': A Problem of Terminology". Journal of the History of Ideas. 40 (4): 621–632. doi:10.2307/2709362. JSTOR 2709362.
- Mott, Lewis Freeman (1896). The System of Courtly Love . Athenaeum Press – via Wikisource.
- Neilson, William Allan (1899). Origins and Sources of the Courts of Love.
- Newman, Francis X., ed. (1968). The Meaning of Courtly Love. Albany: State University of New York Press. ISBN 0-87395-038-0.
- Paris, Gaston (1883). "Études sur les romans de la Table Ronde: Lancelot du Lac, II: Le conte de la charrette" [Studies on the romances of the Round Table: Lancelot du Lac, II: The tale of the cart]. Romania (in French). 12 (48): 459–534. doi:10.3406/roma.1883.6277. JSTOR 45041910.
- Robertson, D. W. Jr. (1962). "Some Medieval Doctrines of Love". A Preface to Chaucer.
- Singer, Irving (2009-02-20). The Nature of Love, Volume 2: Courtly and Romantic. MIT Press. ISBN 978-0-262-51273-2.
- Trachsler, Richard (2006). "Uncourtly Texts in Courtly Books: Observations on MS Chantilly, Musee Conde 475". In Busby, Keith; Kleinhenz, Christopher (eds.). Courtly Arts and the Art of Courtliness: Selected Papers from the Eleventh Triennial Congress of the International Courtly Literature Society. Cambridge, MA: D.S. Brewer. pp. 679–692.

=== Medieval sources ===
- Ovid (1885) [2]. Ars amatoria [The Art of Love] (in Latin). Translated by Henry Thomas Riley. Project Gutenberg 47677.
- Chrétien de Troyes; Godefroi de Leigni (1997) [c. 1176–1182]. Lancelot, le Chevalier de la charrette [Lancelot, the Knight of the Cart] (in Old French). Translated by Burton Raffel. Yale University Press. ISBN 978-0-300-07120-7. JSTOR j.ctt1nq9x7.
- Andreas Capellanus (1941) [c. 1184]. De amore [About Love] (in Latin). Translated by John Jay Parry. The art of courtly love at the Internet Archive.
- Guillaume de Lorris; Jean de Meun (1995) [c. 1230]. Le roman de la rose [The Romance of the Rose] (in Old French). Translated by Charles Dahlberg. JSTOR jj.3716014.
