= Knightly piety =

Knightly Piety refers to a specific strand of Christian belief espoused by knights during the Middle Ages. The term comes from Ritterfrömmigkeit, coined by Adolf Waas in his book Geschichte der Kreuzzüge. Many scholars debate the importance of knightly piety, however it is apparent as an important part of the chivalric ethos based on its appearance within the Geoffroi de Charny's "Book of Chivalry" as well as much of the popular literature of the time.

== Origins ==
A relationship between Christ and warrior is first seen in secular sources dating back to Carolingian times. This is evident within the chansons de geste or songs of heroic deeds. Both the Chanson de Roland and the Chanson de Guillaume demonstrate Christian themes in their tales of the fight against the nonbeliever. Both have elements of an earthly as well as a spiritual fight. Thus by the time of the Chivalric Codes Christianity is already firmly entrenched within the warrior classes. Keen dedicates much of the credit to the effective teaching of the priesthood as well as the close relationship between the nobility and the monasteries.

However, the Catholic Church traditionally had an uneasy relationship with secular warriors dating back to the time of the Roman Empire. It was generally accepted by the Church that warfare and killing was sinful. During the later period of the Empire, theologian Augustine of Hippo wrote of a Just War in the City of God. In this theory he claimed it would be sinful not to defend God if there was no other way to resolve a conflict.

During the late tenth and early eleventh centuries the Church involved itself more with warfare. First came the Peace and Truce of God movements. This was one way for the Church to attempt to Christianize society while at the same time protect non-combatants. The movement promised severe punishments to those who broke this law. However, it was met with mixed success.

In 1095, Pope Urban II preached the First Crusade at Clermont. Here, the Church officially sanctioned lay knights fighting for the Faith when Urban said that any who fought would be absolved of their sins rather than tarnish their soul for killing. By this time knights were already concerned with their immortal soul enough to fight for the Church. By the time the Church began to accept warfare and create the idea of a holy war, piety had already become entrenched in the warfare of the lay knight. However, as the time of increasing church involvement was the formative period of the Chivalric Codes, it helped add another dynamic to the Ritterfrömmigkeit.

== Ritterfrömmigkeit ==
Ritterfrömmigkeit is the unique strand of piety held by knights which is more than just a belief in God or fighting in defense of God. Marcus Bull said, "One of the most important features of the piety of eleventh-century arms-bearers was that it was associative, passive to the extent that it was inspired and sustained by the spiritual resources of a monastic or clerical élite." Bull's idea is that knights believed in God, and they supported the church not for personal worldly gain (this may have been a contributing factor but not the main factor) because of this belief and their desire for salvation. This is demonstrated in many ways.

Knights demonstrated this by not only fighting for God, but many times they would give trophies of war to a major church or monastery as sign of support. Some Burgundian Knights who fought in Spain promised all of their plunder to St. Odilo of Cluny. Keen said, "The richness of the Cluniac ritual and of monastic vestments and ceremony clearly had a powerful impact on the imagination of secular nobles." Many would also bring back relics from their fighting or even join a monastery themselves toward the end of their lives. In fact, it was common for a man to join a religious community he had supported in order to end his career as a way of retirement.

Those who could afford it would even provide money or land for a church as an act of patronage or send their younger children to monasteries as an act of oblation. The patron of a church held much power because he had the right to appoint the local priest. This could be used politically to gain favor with certain people or to further one's own family within the church. Because of the political favor this could gain a person, the purpose has been highly debated among academics. Elizabeth Gemmil wrote, "The use or abuse of patronage...was the driver of social mobility."

== Knights and the Crusades ==
The Crusades are an important dynamic of Knightly Piety, and much of its historiography focuses on the Crusades and why knights were inspired to join them. A cleric of the church was expressly forbidden from killing and could not carry a weapon. As the Church became more militant, it needed a way to fight its battles. The preaching of the Crusade opened up the knighthood to be the tool of the Church.

The Church attempted to command the warrior classes to do its bidding. While the call for warriors to defend the Church became popular, the idea of the Church having control for the most part did not. This demonstrates that while knights believed in the defense of the church and God, they were secular and not part of the church. It distinguishes this strand of piety from that of the clergy, and shows that knights had independent and different roots.

However, there were some who did join the Church, and this led to the creation of a new type of order. These were the Christian military orders, like the Templars and Hospitaliers, separate from the regular knighthood. Members of these orders were knights who had taken vows to God and were part of the Church. However, they were also removed from the other aspects of chivalry so their devotion to God became the most important aspect of their life, and it focused less on the other chivalric virtues.

== Literature ==
This view of knightly piety appears throughout the literature of the Middle Ages. While the details of the literature cannot be taken at face value, the appearance of Christianity in these works marks the importance piety to the warriors of the time. In Lohengrin, Christian prophesy and miracles are spread throughout the work which takes place during the Crusades. The Arthurian Legends are also full of references to God. In Chrétien de Troyes' Perceval, the Story of the Grail, Perceval has two mentors: his mother and Gornemant. Both of them tell Perceval to make sure he always went to church when he could when telling him how to be a knight. His mother told him this before he left along with telling him how to treat women. Gornemant told him this while teaching him how to fight. This demonstrates the importance of piety as much as the values of prowess, franchise, and Courtoisie. The eight knightly virtues drawn from the code of Chivalry are devotions, courtly manners, fellowship, piety, fairness, service, bravery and justice.

According to Schopenhauer in Parerga of his Aphorisms on the wisdom of life, he explains knightly honor as a code of honor distinct from Roman and Greek honor, which is specific to the upper-class, officers, service-men and military, and all those who closely imitate them to gain favor, he states the men of honor principles are:

1. Knightly honor consists not in other people's opinions of what we are worth, but in whether they express it or not. As soon as anyone utters something deprecatory of us, our honor is gone for ever unless we can gain honor. Honor is gained and renewed if title is bestowed by his service or deeds.
2. Honor rests, not on what a man does, but on what he suffers, the obstacles he encounters; differing from the honor which prevails in all else, in consisting, not in what he says or does himself, but in what another man says or does.
3. Honor has absolutely nothing to do with what a man may be in and for what in himself; or, again, with the question whether his moral character can ever become better or worse, and any such inquiries. If your honor happens to be attacked it can be restored in its entirety in a duel.
4. To receive an insult is disgraceful; to give one, honorable. Note: The inverse strongly promotes vice, giving way to vice-respect and further disincentive to collectivist action and welfare.
5. The highest court to which a man can appeal in any differences he may have with another on a point of honor is the court of physical force, that is, of brutality or might. Note: knights by this time tended towards lightness and warrior skill over armor.
6. The only word one may not break is the word of honor – upon my honor, as people say – the presumption being that every other form of promise, oath or pact may be broken. Although one may even break one's word of honor and still remain honorable through a duel, fighting with those who maintain that we pledged our word.

== Military class ==
The military class is a feudal society loose hierarchy, which evolved from a kingship to better serve the realm by formal religious, Catholic guidance or military tribunal. Examples include the Kshatriya or Martial castes in ancient and modern India, the Khalsa class of Sikhism in the Punjab, the samurai class in feudal Japan, the Timawa and Maharlika classes in pre-colonial Philippines and noble knights in feudal Europe.

== See also ==
- Modesty § Catholicism
- Adoration
- Communion Fellowship
- Discipline
- Fidelity
- Knight-service
- Chivalric order
- Germanic idealism
- Teutonic Knight order
- Gallantry
- Courtly love
