= Jacob Samuel Speyer =

Dutch philologist and translator (1849-1913)

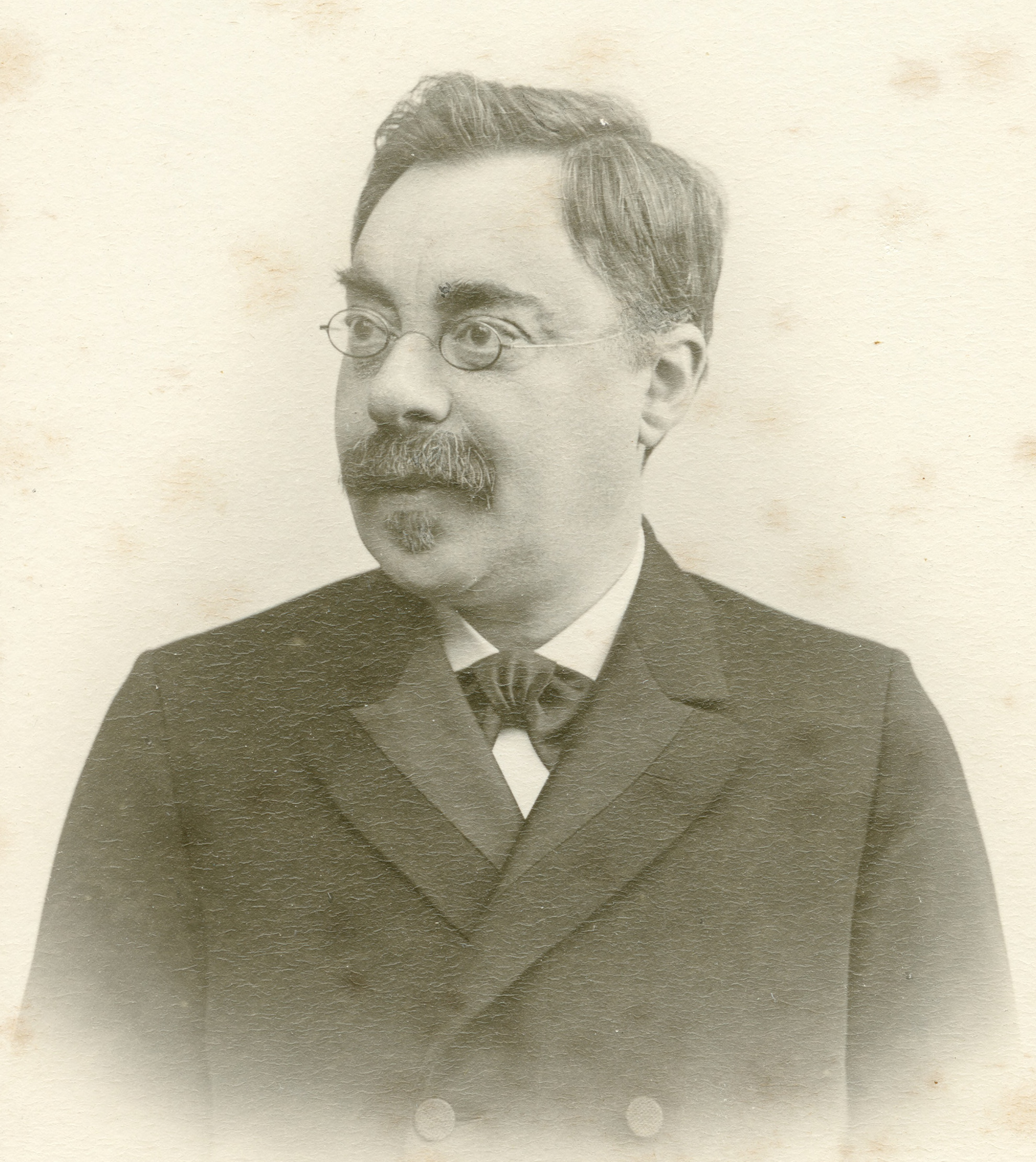
- Born: 20 December 1849; Amsterdam, Netherlands
- Died: 1 November 1913 (aged 63); Leiden, Netherlands

Academic background
- Thesis: Specimen literarium inaugurale de ceremonia apud Indos, quae vocatur jātakarma (1874)
- Doctoral advisor: Johan Hendrik Caspar Kern

Academic work
- Institutions: University of Amsterdam; University of Groningen; University of Leiden
- Doctoral students: Johan Huizinga

Jacob Samuel Speyer (20 December 1849 – 1 November 1913) was a Dutch philologist and translator from Sanskrit.

== Biography ==
Born to a Jewish family in Amsterdam, Jacob Samuel Speyer first attended the Gymnasium before joining the Athenaeum Illustre at the age of not yet 16. He afterwards studied classics at Amsterdam for three years, and then Sanskrit at the University of Leiden, from where he awarded a Ph.D. on 21 December 1872.

Speyer thereafter officiated as teacher at Hoorn and (1873–1888) at the gymnasium of Amsterdam. On 15 October 1877, he was appointed lecturer in Sanskrit and comparative philology at the University of Amsterdam, and he was about to receive a professorship there when he was called to Gröningen as professor of Latin in December 1888. He held this chair until 20 March 1903, when he was appointed to succeed his former teacher Hendrik Kern as professor of Sanskrit at the University of Leiden.

Among other publications, Speyer was the author of an English translation of the Jatakamala, which appeared as the first volume of Max Müller's Sacred Books of the Buddhists, as well as an English version of the Avadanasataka. He was a member of the Royal Academy of Arts and Sciences from 1889, and a knight of the Order of the Netherlands Lion. From 1893 to 1904 he was editor of the Museum.

== Partial bibliography ==
- Speyer, J. S. (1872). Specimen Inaugurale de Ceremonia apud Indos Quæ Vocatur Jatakarma (in Latin). Leiden: Hazenberg.
- — (1886). Lanx Satura. Program of the Gymnasium of Amsterdam.
- — (1886). Sanskrit Syntax. Leiden: E. J. Brill.
- — (1887). Blijspelen van Plautus. Grieksche en latijnsche schrijvers, etc., xi (in Dutch). Leiden: E. J. Brill.
- — (1888). De waarde van het Sanskrit voor de wetenschap van de taal (in Dutch). Amsterdam: S. L. van Looy.
- — (1891). Observationes et Emendationes.
- — (1896). Vedische- und Sanskritsyntax. Grundriss der Indo-Arischen Philologie. Vol. 1. doi:10.1515/9783111581842. ISBN 978-3-11-120877-0.
- — (1897). Phædri Fabulæ.
- — (1900–1901). Latijnsche Spraakkunst (3rd ed.).
- Ârya Sûra (1895). Müller, F. Max (ed.). The Gâtakamâlâ: or, Garland of Birth-Stories. Sacred Books of the Buddhists. Vol. 1. Translated by —. London: Henry Frowde.
- Avādanaçataka: A Century of Edifying Tales Belonging to the Hīnayāna. Bibliotheca Buddhica. Vol. 3. Translated by —. St. Petersburg: St.-Pétersbourg [Académie impériale des sciences]. 1902.
- — (1908). Studies about the Kathāsaritsāgara. Amsterdam: Johannes Müller.
- — (1911). Hindoeïsme (in Dutch). Baarn: Hollandia-Drukkerij.
