= Dutch Civilisation in the Seventeenth Century =

1941 book by Johan Huizinga

- Editor: Peter Geyl; F. W. N. Hugenholz
- Author: Johan Huizinga
- Original title: Nederland's beschaving in de zeventiende eeuw
- Translator: Arnold Pomerans
- Language: Dutch
- Publication date: 1941
- English publication date: 1968

Dutch civilisation in the seventeenth century (Dutch: Nederland's beschaving in de zeventiende eeuw) is a book published in Dutch by the Dutch historian Johan Huizinga in 1941. It was first translated into English by Arnold Pomerans in 1968 and published by the Frederick Ungar Publishing Company. It was edited by Peter Geyl and F. W. N. Hugenholtz.

== Content ==
Huizinga's work analyses the causes, content and consequences of the seventeenth century in the Netherlands, a period that can be broadly subsumed under the title and concept of the Dutch Golden Age. In his view, the efflorescence of art, literature and economic activity that characterised that period was driven by certain key factors: the idea that Dutch society was differentiated from other countries in Europe, for instance, by being fundamentally middle-class. The involvement of the middle-class in public life led to a 'discussion culture' which helped foment new ideas and inventions. Religion was also an important factor here, according to Huizinga, particularly given the virtues of Calvinism (such as "simplicity, thrift and cleanliness") and the two factors were related, for Calvinism had an inherently anti-aristocratic element to it which helped ensure its success amongst people from relatively modest and bourgeois backgrounds.

As with the rest of his oeuvre, Huizinga is concerned with a synthesis of historical analysis that incorporates art and culture as well as political, economic and social factors. He focuses upon a number of key artistic and cultural figures and developments in the Netherlands of the 17th century, including Frans Hals, Rembrandt, Hercules Seghers and Joost van den Vondel (as well as scientists such as Christiaan Huygens).
