= John V. Fleming =

American literary scholar (1936–2026)

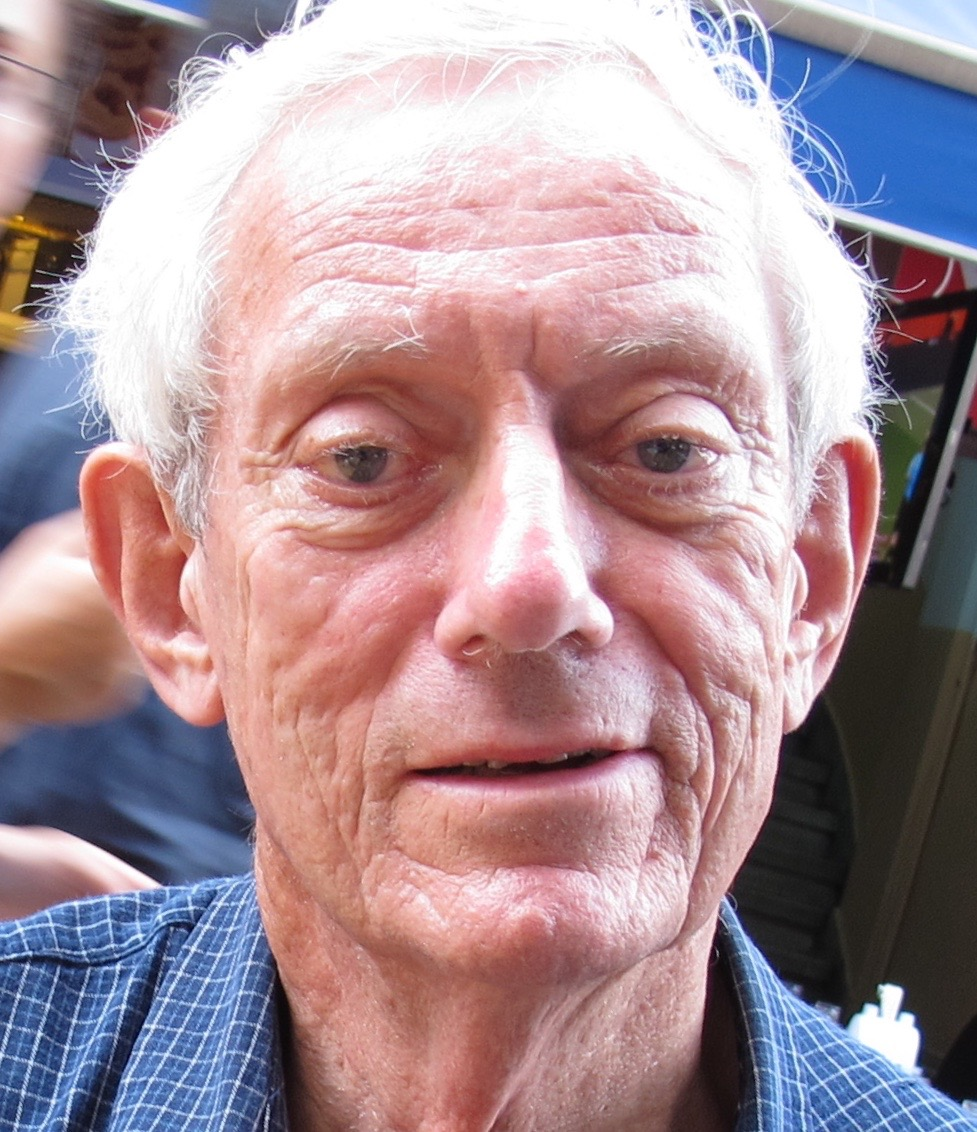
John V. Fleming

John Vincent Fleming (May 20, 1936 – May 30, 2026) was an American literary scholar and the Louis W. Fairchild '24 Professor of English and Comparative Literature, Emeritus, at Princeton University.

== Career ==
Fleming was born on May 20, 1936 and graduated from The University of the South in 1958. After studying at Jesus College, Oxford, as a Rhodes Scholar, Fleming earned his Ph.D. in medieval literature from Princeton University in 1963 after completing a doctoral dissertation, titled "The Roman de la Rose and its manuscript illustrations", under the supervision of D. W. Robertson Jr. He spent two years as an instructor in English at the University of Wisconsin–Madison before returning to Princeton as an assistant professor of English in 1965. Beginning in 1978 he took up a joint appointment in the Department of Comparative Literature. His fields of expertise included medieval English, French, and Latin literatures, and the history and culture of the Franciscan Order in the Middle Ages. He is perhaps best known in Princeton for his popular and erudite lecture course on Geoffrey Chaucer.

From 1995 to 2006, he authored a weekly column in The Daily Princetonian, titled "Gladly Lerne, Gladly Teche" (a reference to Chaucer's Canterbury Tales). He has revived his column under its same name as a blog attached to his website, www.johnvfleming.com. The blog has published a weekly essay, uninterrupted, for more than ten years. He served for several years as a Commissioner of Higher Education of Middle States. He was active in numerous learned societies, including the Medieval Academy of America, which he served as its president. Fleming is a Fellow of the American Academy of Arts and Sciences and of the American Philosophical Society. At Princeton, he was the dissertation director of renowned scholars of medieval literature Carolyn Dinshaw (New York University) and Steven Justice (University of California, Berkeley).

He was married to Joan E. Fleming, a retired priest in the Episcopal Diocese of New Jersey. They are the parents of Richard Arthur Fleming (b. 1964), a sound-recording engineer, artist, and travel writer; Katherine Elizabeth Fleming (b. 1966), a prize-winning historian and university administrator, and current President and CEO of the Getty Foundation; and Luke Owles Fleming (b. 1978), a linguistic anthropologist.

While at Princeton, his wit was widely appreciated and often recorded in a sporadic column titled "Professorial Chrestomathy," including such remarks from his lectures as "As of this morning, you have heard all my jokes and seen all my shirts."

In 2006, after 40 years at Princeton, he moved to emeritus status. Following his retirement, he was honored with two festschrift volumes prepared by former students and other colleagues. The first, Defenders and Critics of Franciscan Life: Essays in Honor of John V. Fleming, ed. Michael F. Cusato and Guy Geltner (Brill: 2009), reflects his work in Franciscan Studies. The second, Sacred and Profane in Chaucer and Late Medieval Literature: Essays in Honour of John V. Fleming, ed. Robert Epstein and William Robins (Toronto: 2010), reflects his contributions to the study of medieval English vernacular literature. He is an elected member of the Guild of Scholars of The Episcopal Church. In 2021 Princeton University awarded him the degree of Doctor of Letters, honoris causa. In retirement Fleming has expanded his field of scholarly publication beyond medieval subjects. His first trade book, a study of classic anti-Communist literature entitled The Anti-Communist Manifestos was published in New York by W. W. Norton in August, 2009. In 2010 it was awarded the annual book prize of the New Jersey Council for the Humanities. This was followed by The Dark Side of the Enlightenment from the same publisher in 2013. He returned to formal scholarly publication in 2017 with a monograph on the Portuguese Renaissance poet Luis de Camões, and he continued to publish occasional commissioned essays and book reviews.

== Books ==
- 1492: An Ongoing Voyage (with Ida Altman and John Hebert) (1992)
- Classical Imitation and Interpretation in Chaucer's Troilus (1990)
- Reason and the Lover (1984)
- From Bonaventure to Bellini: An Essay in Franciscan Exegesis (1982)
- An Introduction to the Franciscan Literature of the Middle Ages (1977)
- Two Poems Attributed to Joachim of Fiore (with Marjorie Reeves), Princeton NJ: The Pilgrim Press, 1978
- The Roman de la Rose: A Study in Allegory and Iconography (1969)
- The Anti-Communist Manifestos (2009)
- The Dark Side of the Enlightenment (2013)
- Luis de Camões: The Poet as Scriptural Exegete (2017)

Academic offices
New post	Fairchild Professor of English at Princeton University; 1982–2006	Succeeded by Diana Fuss
