= Lewis Freeman Mott =

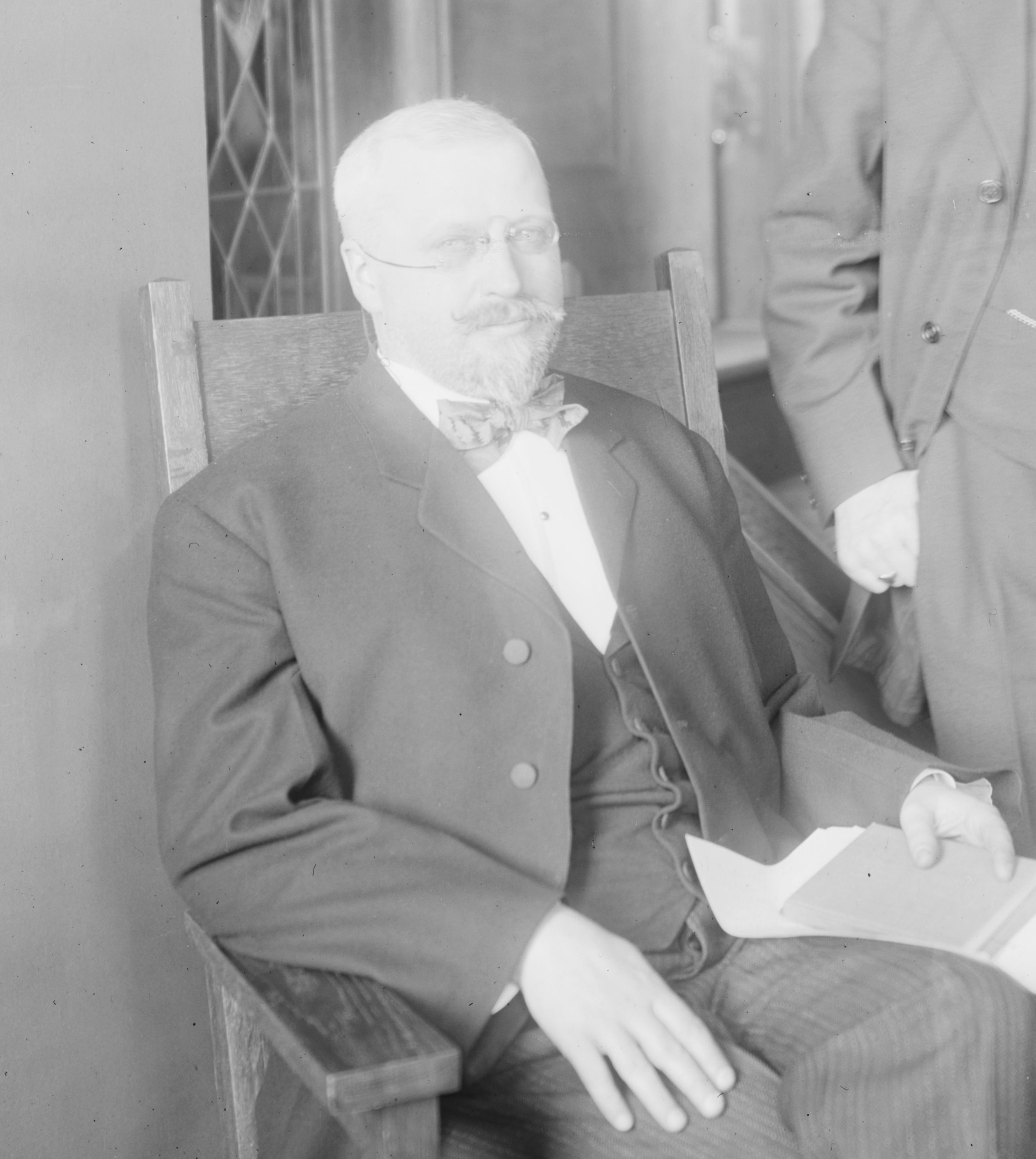
Lewis Freeman Mott

Lewis Freeman Mott (1863 – November 20, 1941) was an American English scholar, born in New York and educated at the City College (S.B., 1883) and at Columbia (Ph.D., 1896). He taught at City College where he became a professor in 1897, and he retired in 1934. Mott served as president of the Modern Language Association in 1911.

His wife, Alice Garrigue Mott (1861–1948), was the younger sister of Tomáš Masaryk's wife.

== Works ==
- The System of Courtly Love. (1894)
- The Provençal Lyric. (1901)
- Sainte-Beuve (1925)
