= The Autumn of the Middle Ages =

1919 history book by Johan Huizinga

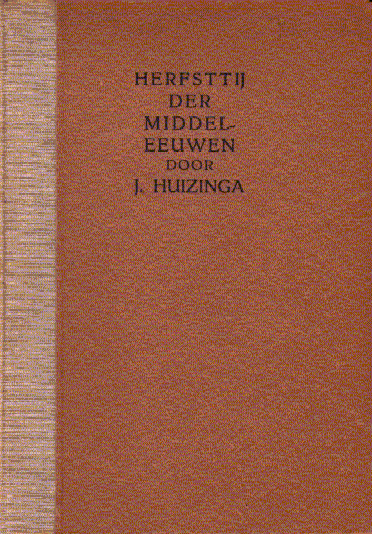
- Author: Johan Huizinga
- Original title: Herfsttij der Middeleeuwen
- Language: Dutch
- Publication date: 1919

The Autumn of the Middle Ages, The Waning of the Middle Ages, or Autumntide of the Middle Ages (published in 1919 as Herfsttij der Middeleeuwen and translated into English in 1924, German in 1924, and French in 1932), is the best-known work by the Dutch historian Johan Huizinga.

== Summary ==
In the book, Huizinga presents the idea that the exaggerated formality and romanticism of late medieval court society was a defence mechanism against the constantly increasing violence and brutality of general society. He saw the period as one of pessimism, cultural exhaustion, and nostalgia, rather than of rebirth and optimism.

His main conclusion is that the combination of required modernization of state governance, stuck in traditionalism, with the exhausting inclusion of an ever-growing corpus of Catholic rites and popular beliefs in daily life, led to the implosion of late medieval society. This provided light to the rise of (religious) individualism, humanism and scientific progress: the Renaissance.

== Reception ==
The author was nominated for the 1939 Nobel Prize for Literature, but lost to the Finnish writer Frans Eemil Sillanpää.

Huizinga's work later came under some criticism, especially for relying too heavily on evidence from the rather exceptional case of the Burgundian court. Other criticisms include the writing of the book being "old-fashioned" and "too literary".

== Translations ==
A new English translation of the book was published in 1996 because of perceived deficiencies in the original translation. The new translation, by Rodney Payton and Ulrich Mammitzsch, was based on the second edition of the Dutch publication in 1921 and compared with the German translation published in 1924.

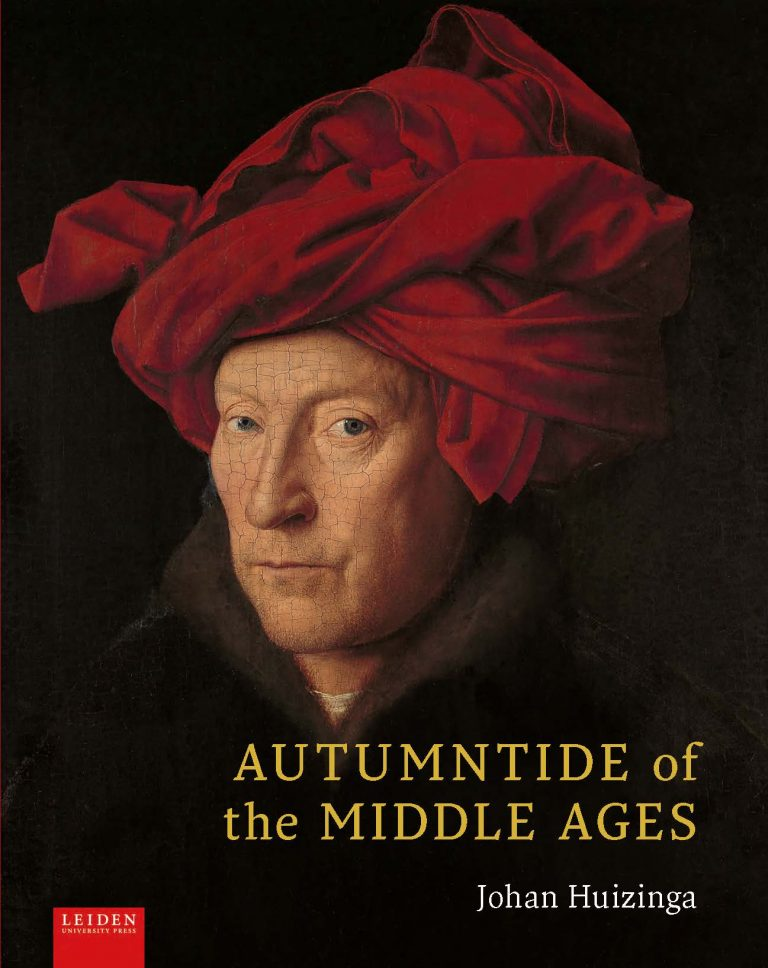
Johan Huizinga: Autumntide of the Middle Ages. Book cover of 2020 edition.

To mark the centenary of Herfsttij, a new translation by Diane Webb appeared in 2020, published by Leiden University Press: Autumntide of the Middle Ages. According to Benjamin Kaplan, this translation "captures Huizinga's original voice better than either of the two previous English editions". This new English edition also includes for the first time 300 full-colour illustrations of all the works of art Huizinga mentions in his text.

In the 1970s, Radio Netherlands produced an audio series about the book, entitled "Autumn of the Middle Ages: A Six-part History in Words and Music from the Low Countries".

== See also ==
- The Civilization of the Renaissance in Italy

== Sources ==
- Bouwsma, William J. (1974). "The Waning of the Middle Ages". Daedalus. 103 (1): 35–43.
- Peters, Edward; Simons, Walter P. (1999). "The New Huizinga and the Old Middle Ages". Speculum. 74 (3): 587–62. doi:10.2307/2886762. JSTOR 2886762. S2CID 162024427.
- Moran, Sean Farrell (2016). "Johan Huizinga, The Waning of the Middle Ages, and the Writing of History". Michigan Academician. 43 (3): 410–423. doi:10.7245/0026-2005-43.3.410.
- Huizinga, Johan (2020). Autumntide of the Middle Ages. Leiden University Press. ISBN 9789087283131. Translated by Diane Webb. Edited by Graeme Small & Anton van der Lem. The translation is based on the Dutch edition of 1941 – the last edition Huizinga worked on. It features English renderings of the Middle French poems and other contemporary sources, and its colour illustrations include over three hundred paintings and prints, illuminated manuscripts, and miniatures pertinent to Huizinga’s discourse. Also includes a complete bibliography of Huizinga’s sources and an epilogue that addresses the meaning and enduring importance of this classic work.
