= Desmond Seward =

20th-century British historian (1935–2022)

Desmond Eric Christopher Seward (22 May 1935 – 3 April 2022) was an Anglo-Irish popular historian and the author of many books, including biographies of Henry IV of France, Eleanor of Aquitaine, Marie Antoinette, Empress Eugénie and Napoleon's family. He specialised in Britain and France in the late Middle Ages.

== Biography ==
Seward's father was William Eric Louis Seward, MC (1891–1975), a Franco-Irishman and industrialist in France whose experiences as a World War I aviator in Palestine were documented by his son in Wings over the Desert (2009). Born in Paris into a family long established at Bordeaux, Desmond Seward was educated at Ampleforth College in North Yorkshire and at St Catharine's College, Cambridge. He wrote extensively on medieval France and about the military religious orders on which he was considered an authority. Seward was fluent in French and read Italian, Latin, medieval English and Norman French. He was noted for conducting research on primary sources at relevant foreign locations, and wrote historically-oriented travel books. His work was translated into ten languages, including Hebrew and Japanese.

He lived in the English countryside on the Berkshire-Wiltshire border. He died on 3 April 2022 at the age of 86. A requiem mass was arranged at Douai Abbey in Reading.

== Critical reception ==
Seward's work was generally well received by critics as offering a balance of readability and modern scholarship. The First Bourbon (1971), a biography of Henry IV, founder of the Bourbon dynasty, was described by Dame Veronica Wedgwood in The Daily Telegraph as a "sympathetic and well balanced portrait, drawn with a vigorous enthusiasm suitable to the subject [...] a most enjoyable and useful biography of a great man." History Today called it "An admirable book. Here a great success story [...] is not only told with much verve and pellucid readability, but above all is told from within the age itself."

The Hundred Years War: The English in France 1337–1453 (1978) was rated "a well written narrative, beautifully illustrated, and which takes into account most recent research. It is also a good read." in the view of Richard Cobb writing in the New Statesman. The New Yorker noted that "Mr Seward shows us all the famous sights of those roaring times [...] and illuminates them with an easy scholarship, a nice sense of detail [...] and a most agreeable clarity of style."

Richard III: England's Black Legend (1983) proved controversial because of the author's rejection of the modern argument that Richard's "black legend" was no more than Tudor propaganda. Members of the Richard III Society took issue with Seward's description of the king as "a peculiarly grim young English precursor of Machiavelli's Prince". A.L. Rowse, however, described the book as "a sensible, reliable account." John Julius Norwich judged it "perhaps the best, and certainly the most readable, of recent biographies." In August 2014, the Folio Society published an updated edition of Richard III: England's Black Legend in the light of evidence from his skeleton. Seward argues that the savage way in which Richard was hacked to death demonstrates how much he was hated and that, with the proof of a deformity, this strengthens the case for Shakespeare's portrait being not so far from the truth.

Seward, a conservative Roman Catholic, was strongly criticised by Frank McLynn in The Independent for credulity in endorsing such religious phenomena as the "sun dancing" spectacle at Fátima in Portugal and elsewhere. Other reviewers disagreed, The London Evening Standard noting that The Dancing Sun: Journeys to the Miracle Shrines (1993) "is not, however, a book of credulous modern piety, but an example of that much more interesting English literary genre, the journey as a means of personal discovery." The Tablet concurred, observing that Seward had approached the subject as a sceptic but was "honest about the fact that his journey is also in part a search for reassurance for his own faltering faith"

Reviewing Renishaw Hall: The Story of the Sitwells (2015) in the Sunday Times John Carey observed that of Osbert, Edith and Sacheverell Sitwell "Seward takes a sensible view of the trio's literary output, grading it second-rate at best", while observing drily that Edith's poetry "still has its admirers.". The Literary Review noted approvingly that "Desmond Seward has written a revisionist history of those birds of brilliant plumage, the Sitwells."

In 2019 Seward produced what was regarded by some critics as one of his best works, The King Over the Water, a history of the Jacobites.

== Bibliography ==
=== Books ===
- The First Bourbon: Henri IV, King of France and Navarre (1971)
- The Monks of War: The Military Religious Orders (1972)
- Prince of the Renaissance (1973)
- The Bourbon Kings of France (1976)
- Eleanor of Aquitaine (1978)
- The Hundred Years' War (1978)
- Monks and Wine (1979)
- Marie Antoinette (1981)
- Richard III (1983)
- Naples (1984)
- Italy's Knights of St George (1986)
- Napoleon's Family (1986)
- Henry V (Henry V as Warlord; 1987)
- Napoleon and Hitler (1988)
- Byzantium (with Susan Mountgarret, 1988)
- Metternich (1991)
- Brooks's: A Social History (jt ed with Philip Ziegler, 1991)
- The Dancing Sun: Journeys to the Miracle Shrines (1993)
- Sussex (1995)
- The Wars of the Roses (1995)
- Caravaggio (1998)
- Eugénie (2004)
- Savonarola (2006)
- Jerusalem's Traitor (2009)
  - Also called: Josephus, Masada and the Fall of Judaea (da Capo, US, April 2009)
- Wings over the Desert: In Action with an RFC pilot in Palestine, 1916–18 (2009)
- Old Puglia: A Portrait of South Eastern Italy (with Susan Mountgarret, 2009)
- The Last White Rose: The Spectre at the Tudor Court, 1485–1547 (2010; aka The Last White Rose: The Secret Wars of the Tudors).
- The Demon's Brood: A History of the Plantagenet Dynasty (2014)
- Renishaw Hall: "The Story of the Sitwells" (2015)
- The King Over the Water: A Complete History of the Jacobites (2019)

=== Book reviews ===
Date	Review article	Work(s) reviewed
2013	"[Untitled review]". Reviews. History Today. 63 (11): 62–63. November 2013.	De Lisle, Leanda (2013). Tudor : the family story. London: Chatto & Windus.
