= The Chaucer Review =

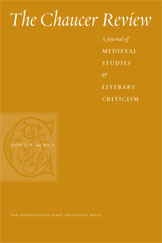
- Discipline: Literature
- Language: English
- Edited by: Susanna Fein, David Raybin

Publication details
- History: 1966-present
- Publisher: Penn State University Press (United States)
- Frequency: Quarterly

Standard abbreviations
- ISO 4: Chaucer Rev.

Indexing
- ISSN: 0009-2002 (print); 1528-4204 (web)
- JSTOR: 00092002
- OCLC no.: 43359050

Links
- Journal homepage; Online access

The Chaucer Review: A Journal of Medieval Studies and Literary Criticism is an academic journal published quarterly by the Penn State University Press. Founded in 1966 by Robert W. Frank Jr. (who continued as editor through 2002) and Edmund Reiss, The Chaucer Review acts as a forum for the presentation and discussion of research and concepts about Chaucer and the literature of the Middle Ages. The journal publishes studies of language, social and political contexts, aesthetics, and associated meanings of Chaucer's poetry, as well as articles on medieval literature, philosophy, theology, and mythography relevant to study of the poet and his contemporaries, predecessors, and audiences.

The four annual issues are published in January, April, July, and October and are distributed by the Johns Hopkins University Press.
