= Abd Allah al-Qaysi =

Muslim jurist and theologian

Personal life
- Born: Emirate of Córdoba
- Died: 885 or 886

Religious life
- Religion: Islam
- Denomination: Sunni
- Jurisprudence: Zahiri

Muslim leader
- Influenced: Ibn Hazm

Abu Muhammad Abd Allah bin Muhammad bin Qasim bin Hilal bin Yazid bin 'Imran al-'Absi al-Qaysi (Arabic: عبدالله القيسي) was an early Muslim jurist and theologian.

== Life ==
Born in Islamic Spain, Ibn Qasim moved to Iraq for a time, and studied under Dawud al-Zahiri. He left the Malikite school of Muslim jurisprudence for the Zahirite branch, and was considered by Christopher Melchert to be the first Zahirite in the region. Ibn Qasim copied his teacher's books by hand and was responsible for spreading them throughout Al-Andalus.

Ibn Qasim died in the year 272 on the Islamic calendar, corresponding to 885 or 886 on the Gregorian calendar.

He was listed by later Zahirite jurist Ibn Hazm as having been, along with Ruwaym, Ibn al-Mughallis and Mundhir bin Sa'īd al-Ballūṭī, one of the primary proponents of the Zahirite school of Islamic law. Ibn Hazm, who was also an early champion of the school, was essentially reviving Ibn Qasim's efforts; earlier Zahirites such as Balluti kept their views to themselves.
