= Saadiah Mufarreh =

Kuwait poet and journalist

- سعدية مفرح
- Born: 21 March 1964 (age 61)
- Education: Arabic Language and Education, Kuwait University, 1987
- Occupations: Poet, critic, journalist
- Website: https://www.saadiahmufarreh.com/

Saadiah Mufarreh (Arabic: سعدية المفرح; born 1964) is a Kuwaiti poet, critic, and journalist working as an arts editor of Kuwaiti newspaper Al-Qabas, and has published several poetry collections.

== Early life ==
Saadiah was born in Al Jahra, Kuwait. She graduated from Kuwait University in 1987 with a degree in Arabic Language and Education, and worked as an editor for the culture section of Al-Watan and Al-Qabas.

== Career ==
She started her career before 1990, when she had her book "He Was the Last of the Dreamers" published. She published her short book "When You’re Absent, I Saddle My Suspicion’s Horses" in Beirut in 1994. She pursued her career in writing and creativity, publishing her third book, "Book of Sins", that was issued from the General Egyptian Book Organization in 1997, in addition to "Mere: A Mirror Lying Back” in 1999.

By 2006, a new poetry book by Mufarreh, "My Dreams Often Humble Themselves", was published which increased her popularity in the Arab region. Many of her poems were published in newspapers and Arabic magazines, and translated to a variety of languages, such as English, French, German, Spanish, Swedish, and Persian. Translations of her poetry can be found in the Scottish Poetry Library and Jehat among several websites.

As well as writing books and poetry, she wrote regularly in columns for several newspapers and magazines such as Al-Qabas, Al-Arabi, and KWT Magazine. She also wrote for Al Riyadh and Alaraby. She wrote critiques and weekly and monthly articles for several newspapers and magazines.

Mufarreh is continuing to contribute regularly to websites such as Alaraby's and others'.

== Works ==
- 1990: "He was the Last of the Dreamers" (original title: Ākhir al-Ḥalimīn Kan)
- 1994: "When You’re Absent, I Saddle My Suspicion’s Horses" (original title: Taghīb fa ʾUsarrej Khayl Ẓunūni)
- 1997: "Book of Sins" (original title: Kitab al-Āthām)
- 1999: "Mere: A Mirror Lying Back" (original title: Mujarrad Mirʾāh Mustalqiyah)
- 1999: "The Houses and Palms" (original title: al-Nakhl wa-al-Buyūt)
- 2006: "My Dreams Often Humble Themselves" (original title: Tawāḍaʿat Aḥlāmi Kathīran)
- 2007: "The Axe of Gloom and Confinement" (original title: Ḥadāt al-Ghaym wa-al-Waḥshah)
- 2008: "A Night of Captivation" (original title: Layl Mashghūl bi-al-Fitnah)
- 2008: "A Windowed Coffin" (original title: Qabr bi-Nāfidhah Wāḥidah)
- 2008: "Arabic Poetry Collection of the Final Quarter of the 20th Century" (original title: Dīwān al-Shiʿr al-ʿArabī fi al-Rubʿ al-Akhīr min al-Qarn al-ʿIshrīn)
- 2010: "Walk of a Goose" (original title: Mashyat al-Iwazzah)
- 2010: "Narrative’s Desire: Footnotes on the Edge of Interpretation" (original title: Shahwat al-Sard: Hawāmish ʿalá Ḥāffat al-Taʾwīl)
- 2010: "Painful Memory: 15 Palestinian Poets" (original title: Wajaʿ al-Dhākirah: 15 Shaʿir min Filisṭīn)
- 2011: "Q… To the Vague Autobiography" (original title: Sīn ... Naḥwa Sīrah Dhātiyyah Nāqiṣah)
- 2012:"Oh Susan, How Miserable We Are" (original title: Kam Naḥn Waḥīdatān Ya Suzān
- 2013: "He Says, Follow Me Deer" (original title: Yaqūl Itbaʿīni Ya Ghazālah)
- 2013: "And Mankind Wakes: Biographies and Selections from Arab Poets" (original title: Wa-Yashar al-Khalq: Siyar wa-Mukhtārāt al-Shuʿarāʾ al-ʿArab)

== Awards ==
- Chosen by The Guardian as a representative of Kuwait in The World Record: International Voices from Poetry Parnassus.
- Chosen by the World Poetry Movement as an ambassador for Kuwaiti poetry.
- Chosen as a representative of Kuwaiti poetry in international anthologies held in Britain, the U.S., Germany, France, Poland, Italy and others.
