= Ibn Sayyid al-Nas =

Ibn Sayyid al-Nas may refer to:

- Abu Bakr Ibn Sayyid al-Nās (d. 1261 CE), Muslim theologian and grandfather of the below.
- Fatḥ al-Din Ibn Sayyid al-Nās (d. 1334 CE), Muslim theologian and grandson of the above.
