= Ibn Mada' =

Andalusian Muslim polymath (1116–1195)

Imam Ibn Maḍāʾ ابن مضاء

Personal life
- Born: 1116 Córdoba, Spain
- Died: 1195 (aged 78–79) Seville, Spain
- Era: Islamic golden age
- Region: Iberian Peninsula
- Occupation: Scholar, Polymath, Judge, Jurist, Grammarian, Linguist

Religious life
- Religion: Islam
- Denomination: Sunni
- Jurisprudence: Zahiri
- Creed: Ash'ari

Muslim leader
- Influenced by: Dawud al-Zahiri Abu Hasan al-Ash'ari Sibawayh Al-Jahiz Qadi Ayyad
- Influenced: Abu Hayyan Al Gharnati

Abu al-Abbas Ahmad bin Abd al-Rahman bin Muhammad bin Sa'id bin Harith bin Asim al-Lakhmi al-Qurtubi, better known as Ibn Maḍāʾ (Arabic: ابن مضاء; 1116–1196) was an Andalusian Muslim polymath from Córdoba in Al-Andalus. Ibn Mada was notable for having challenged the traditional formation of Arabic grammar and of the common understanding of linguistic governance among Arab grammarians, performing an overhaul first suggested by Al-Jahiz 200 years prior. He is considered the first linguist in history to address the subject of dependency in the grammatical sense in which it is understood today, and was instrumental during the Almohad reforms as chief judge of the Almohad Caliphate.

== Biography ==
=== Education ===
Ibn Mada's exact date of birth is a matter of dispute, having been listed as both 1116 and 1119 according to the Gregorian calendar. His family was famous within their local community. Ibn Mada was not known to have traveled outside of Cordoba prior to his academic study. He grew up in a family of noble origin, and as a youth he seemed to concern himself only with pursuing his education. In addition to religion, he was also well-versed in geometry and medicine.

He moved from Cordoba to Seville where he studied Arabic grammar and syntax from the works of Sibawayh. Later, he left the Iberian Peninsula for Ceuta in Morocco in order to study historiography and prophetic tradition with Muslim academic Qadi Ayyad. Ibn Mada was most affected by his linguistic study, excelling so far as to develop his own independent opinions in regard to disputes among grammarians.

=== Career ===
Ibn Mada initially served as a judge in Fes in present-day Morocco and later at Béjaïa in present-day Algeria. It was during his initial judgeship that he was a teacher of fellow Andalusian theologian and litterateur, Ibn Dihya al-Kalby. Later on, Almohad Caliph Abu Yaqub Yusuf chose him to serve as the chief judge for the caliphate. He served in Fes, Marrakesh and Seville, outliving Abu Yaqub to serve under the caliph's son Abu Yusuf Yaqub al-Mansur and remaining as the empire's chief judge for the remainder of his life. During the Almohad reforms, he assisted the Almohad authorities in banning any and all religious books written by non-Zahirites during the reign of Abu Yaqub Yusuf, and oversaw the outright burning of such books under Yusuf's son Abu Yusuf Yaqub al-Mansur. Ibn Maḍāʾs adherence to Zahirism has been described by Dutch arabist Kees Versteegh as "fanatical." He died in Seville the Islamic calendar month of Jumada al-awwal during the Hijri year of 592, corresponding to 1196 in the Gregorian calendar, just as he was approaching eighty years of age.

== Theological position ==
The brilliant polymath Ibn Mada' was a proponent of the Ash'ari doctrine that opposed philosophy in general and Aristotle in particular, contending that reason should only be used to counter classical influences that were infiltrating into Islamic intellectual life. The Ash'ari adherents believed that the Quran and Hadith represented the infallible, accurate word of truth.

== Views ==
Ibn Mada rose to fame as one of the first to launch attack on Arabic grammar theory and called for its reformation. Although he was concerned with attacking all major schools of Arabic grammar, he was focused on the grammar of the linguists of Basra, as it was the most popular school around him. His attack on eastern Arabic grammar was violent yet reasoned and eloquent, defending his view that grammar as it was understood in that region was complicated, casuistic, obscure and artificial; Ibn Mada instead called for building simple and clear grammar based on true facts of the language. Among his ideas which were considered revolutionary both during his life and with renewed interest in his work during the 1950s was the abolition of governance and linguistic analogy. Ibn Mada felt that scholarly work on the Arabic language was intentionally convoluted and inaccessible to both non-native speakers and laymen Arabs, and that an overall simplification of language and grammar would enhance overall comprehension of Arabic. Ibn Mada held great respect for the language as the native speakers understood it, and while he emphasized a simplification of grammar he did not advocate a complete overhaul of the entire language.

His Zahirite views in Muslim jurisprudence influenced his views in linguistics. He explicitly denied the ability of human beings to willfully choose what they say and how they say it, since speech – like all other things – is predetermined by God. Because Arabic grammarians during Ibn Mada's time often linked the spoken language to grammatical causes, they earned both his linguistic and theological ire. In his view, the Zahirite denial of legal causality in regard to Islamic law carried over into a denial of linguistic causality in regard to Arabic grammar.

Ibn Mada's reaction toward Arabic grammar and grammarians wasn't without provocation. Both earlier Zahirite jurists such as Ibn Hazm and al-Ballūṭī and some Shafi'ites sparred with Hanafite jurists who sought to justify practices such as Istihsan, on the basis of grammatical and linguistic arguments. Thus suspicion and antagonism toward grammarians in the east, where the Hanafite rite predominated, had already been started before Ibn Mada began his whole-scale vehemence.

== Legacy ==
=== Influence ===
Ibn Mada's mastery of the Arabic language and its subfields was so great that, at the time, he was said to have been isolated from the general body of scholarship in terms of sheer knowledge. His refutation was written toward the end of his life and demonstrated his clarity of thought and independent judgment, causing his student Ibn Dihya al-Kalby to brand him as the leader of all grammarians. His critical views of Arabic grammar as it was taught in the eastern Muslim world found an audience with other linguistic and religious scholars of the western half, Abu Hayyan Al Gharnati being one example. Gharnati also criticized so-called "eastern grammarians" and, after his treatise on the non-existence of grammatic causality, cited Ibn Mada as his inspiration. Although Ibn Dihya, Abu Hayyan and Ibn Mada shared their Zahirite and Andalusian backgrounds, not all of Ibn Mada's intellectual descendants shared these traits.

Thus, while Ibn Mada opened the discussion regarding the competence of grammarians, suspicion surrounding them and the religious implications of their work continued even after his death. In the mid-20th century, the rediscovery of Ibn Mada's Refutation by Egyptian linguist Shawqi Daif caused minor shockwaves. Convinced that Ibn Mada's abolition of linguistic analogy and governance were the solutions to the failure of Arabic language education, Daif used this foundation for his later advocacy of modernizing language arts education in the Middle East. So strong was Ibn Mada's refutation of grammarians that University of Oxford Laudian Professor of Arabic Geert Jan van Gelder referred to Ibn Mada as the Sextus Empiricus of the Arab world.

=== Works ===
- al-Radd ‘alá al-Nuḥāh (الرد على النحاة)
- al-Mashriq fī Iṣlāḥ al-Manṭiq (المشرق في إصلاح المنطق)
- Tanzīh al-Qur’ān ‘ammā lā Yalīqu min al-Bayān (تنزيه القرآن عما لا يليق من البيان)

== See also ==
- List of Ash'aris
