= Abu al-Hasan al-Daylami =

Sufi author

- Born: First half of the 10th century
- Died: 1001/02
- Occupation: Sufi author
- Writing career
- Notable work: ʿAtf al-alif al-ma'luf 'ala al-lam al-ma'tuf Sirat al-Shaykh al-Kabir Abu Abd Allah ibn al-Khafif al-Shirazi; Mashyakha

Abu al-Hasan al-Daylami (died c. 1001/02) was a Sufi author of Daylamite origin, who was based in Shiraz during the 10th century. His book ʿAtf al-alif al-ma'luf 'ala al-lam al-ma'tuf ("The attachment of the alif of union to the lām of inclination"), albeit written in Arabic, is considered the first Persian Sufi text on the subject of divine love.

Indirect information confirms that al-Daylami belonged to one of the Daylamite families of the Buyid era, who during the first half of the 10th-century left northern Iran and settled in places to the south, especially the region of Fars. Based on this, al-Daylami was most likely born in the first half of the 10th-century. Al-Daylami studied irfan (gnosis) under Ibn Khafif (died 982), who was also from a Daylamite background. From 963 and onwards, while al-Daylami was still young, he was trained in suluk (spiritual wayfaring) by Ibn Khafif.

Al-Daylami wrote about the life and sayings of Ibn Khafif in his book Sirat al-Shaykh al-Kabir Abu Abd Allah ibn al-Khafif al-Shirazi. Its information suggests that al-Daylami interacted and affiliated with the majority of Ibn Khafif's students and friends. Al-Daylami also reportedly met Abu Nasr as-Sarraj (died 988) and Abu Abd Allah Husayn ibn Ahmad al-Baytar (died 974), according to a report in the Shadd al-izar, which quotes al-Daylami. According to an account by the Egyptian historian al-Qifti (died 1248), al-Daylami was gathered with others in the presence of the Buyid vizier Mu'ayyad al-Mulk Abu Ali Ahmad ibn Husayn Rukhkhaji, who had been in office since 1002.

Al-Daylami seemingly visited the cities of Mecca, Baghdad, and Antioch, and probably other places as well. He ultimately went back to Shiraz, where he stayed for a long time. He died in 1001 or 1002. No surviving information exists about his family, students, death location or burial place.

== Sources ==
- Böwering, Gerhard (1995). "Deylamī, Abū'l-Ḥasan ʿAlī". In Yarshater, Ehsan (ed.). Encyclopædia Iranica. Vol. VII/4: Deylam, John of–Divorce IV. In modern Persia. London and New York: Routledge & Kegan Paul. pp. 338–339. ISBN 978-1-56859-022-6.
- Hosseini, Zahra (2017). "al-Daylamī, Abū al-Ḥasan". In Madelung, Wilferd; Daftary, Farhad (eds.). Encyclopaedia Islamica Online. Brill Online. ISSN 1875-9831.
