= Abu Bakr Ibn Sayyid al-Nās =

Muslim theologian

Ibn Sayyid al-Nas
- Born: 1200; Seville, Andalusia (today Spain)
- Died: 1261
- Era: Medieval era
- Region: North Africa
- School: Zahiri

Muhammad bin Ahmad bin Abdullah bin Muhammad bin Yahya bin Muhammad bin Muhammad bin Sayyid al-Nas al-Ya'mari, better known as Abu Bakr Ibn Sayyid al-Nās, was a Medieval Muslim theologian. He was the grandfather of Fatḥ al-Din Ibn Sayyid al-Nās, though he died before ever meeting his grandson.

== Life ==
The Ya'mari were an Arab tribe who settled down in Úbeda in the region of Jaén, though Ibn Sayyid al-Nas himself was born in Seville in 1200CE. The family eventually settled in Tunis due to fighting between Christians and Muslims in Spain, where Ibn Sayyid al-Nas had a son. His grandson, also a Muslim theologian and also called Ibn Sayyid al-Nas, was born in Egypt several years after the death of the elder Ibn Sayyid al-Nas.

Ibn Sayyid al-Nas studied religion from an early age. He began his education during his early teens under theologians such as Abu al-Abbas al-Nabati, from whom he learned Muslim jurisprudence on the Zahiri rite for over thirty years. He died in Tunis on June 24, 1261.

== Work ==
Ibn Sayyid al-Nas spent a brief period of time in Aznalcázar before moving to North Africa and accepting positions as the imam of mosques in Tangier and later Béjaïa. When his reputation spread into Africa, the Hafsid Caliph Muhammad I al-Mustansir invited him to Tunis where he was a favored scholar of the court until his death. There was a measure of controversy regarding the numerous Ijazah permissions to teach of Ibn Sayyid al-Nas; quite a few of the written permissions were granted by his teacher al-Nabati from al-Nabati's own teachers, whom Ibn Sayyid al-Nas did not meet or study with personally. Ibn Sayyid al-Nas was said to have memorized over ten thousand hadith, or recorded statements of the Muslim prophet Muhammad, along with their chains of authentication; his students were often awed by his ability to accurately recall all of this from memory.
