= Kitab al-Zahra =

Book of the flower by Ibn Dawud

Kitab al-Zahrah
- Author: Ibn Dawud
- Original title: كتاب الزهرة
- Language: Arabic
- Genre: Arabic Literature, Arab Adab

Kitab al-Zahrah (Arabic: كتاب الزهرة) is a late ninth-century Arabic literary anthology compiled by the Abbasid-era scholar Ibn Dawud (868CE–910CE)

== Author ==
As Ibn Dāwūd lived as an Abbasid-era legal scholar, most of his work was on legal topics, except for Kitab al-Zahrah, which ended up being his only surviving written work. It is said by many scholars that he ended writing Kitab al-Zahrah due to his unrequited love for a male friend. It is this same male friend who Dāwūd's unfulfilled desire for led to his untimely death. Despite very little being known for sure about Ibn Dāwūd's life, many of the ghazal (love poems) in Kitab al-Zahrah are attributed to “a Man of Our Times” (بعض أهل هذا العص). Although this name is a pseudonym, many ancient and modern scholars have acknowledged that the author behind these poems is Ibn Dāwūd. This may be ascribed to Ibn Dawud's life-long obsession with love, specifically male-male love.

== Sources and Origin ==
Ibn Dāwūd compiled Kitab al-Zahra in Baghdad, his hometown. The anthology contains 100 chapters with 50 chapters classified as ghazals, and the second half addresses various themes, including religion. The anthology draws from many sources, but historians have noted that he tended to attribute his verses to contemporaries and concealed his poetic gift.

The sources drawn upon span several traditions and literary ages, including pre-Islamic, Umayyad, and Abbasid ages. In the book, he cites famous poets such as Abū Tammām, Al-Buhturī, and others. Additionally, in discussing perspectives on love, Ibn Dāwūd used both Greek Philosophy and Islamic hadith.

Kitāb al-Zahrah survives in two major manuscripts. The first part is based on a copy held at Dār al-Kutub al-Miṣriyyah in Egypt and was first published in 1932, then republished in 1975 by later editors. The second part draws on different manuscripts, specifically ones preserved in the Iraqi Museum and in Turin, Italy.

== Structure of the Composition ==
Ibn Dawud divides Kitab al-Zahra into one hundred chapters, with each one covering poems on a particular subject, either grouped by central idea or by poets that fit a certain description. The first fifty chapters are entirely written on love poetry (known as ghazal), making the work one of the earliest Arabic collections of Arabic writings that offers in depth commentary on the subject. The second fifty chapters cover a variety of other poetic genres, beginning with three chapters of Islamic panegyric poetry in praise of God, the Prophet Muḥammad, and his household. It ends with chapters of poetic “curiosities” and linguistic experiments that go beyond conventional poetic norms, including lipograms, palindromes, pangrams, and verses containing Persian or Greek words. Ibn Dawud explains that he arranged the book as such as it models the structure of his anthology on the traditional qasidah, which usually open with amatory verses (nasib) and then introduces the main subject of praise (madih). Iyas Nasser argues this makes Kitab al-Zahrah the only known poetry anthology to be based on the traditional structure of the qasidah.

== Significance and Influence ==
Kitāb al-Zahrah's themes are split with the first half of the anthology featuring love poems and the second half depicting many different themes, but particularly panegyric religious poetry. Ibn Dāwūd intentionally organized the anthology in this manner to match “the method of poets,” as verses about love are generally placed in the beginnings of qaṣīdahs, preceding the main subject. The various themes include love anecdotes, passion, praise for God, and praise for Prophet Muḥammad. Dr. Iyas Nasser argues that the anthology's format is based on the form of the Abbasid qaṣīdah, arguing that Dāwūd “arranges his anthology in two halves corresponding to the two sections of the Abbasid panegyrical qaṣīdah: amatory opening and panegyric.” Nasser also identifies Kitāb al-Zahrah as uniquely one of the only anthologies to be organized in this manner, and it uses this method to link religious poetry to love poetry.
