= Ibn al-Baytar =

Andalusian Arab pharmacist, botanist, physician and scientist (1197–1248)

Ibn al-Bayṭār
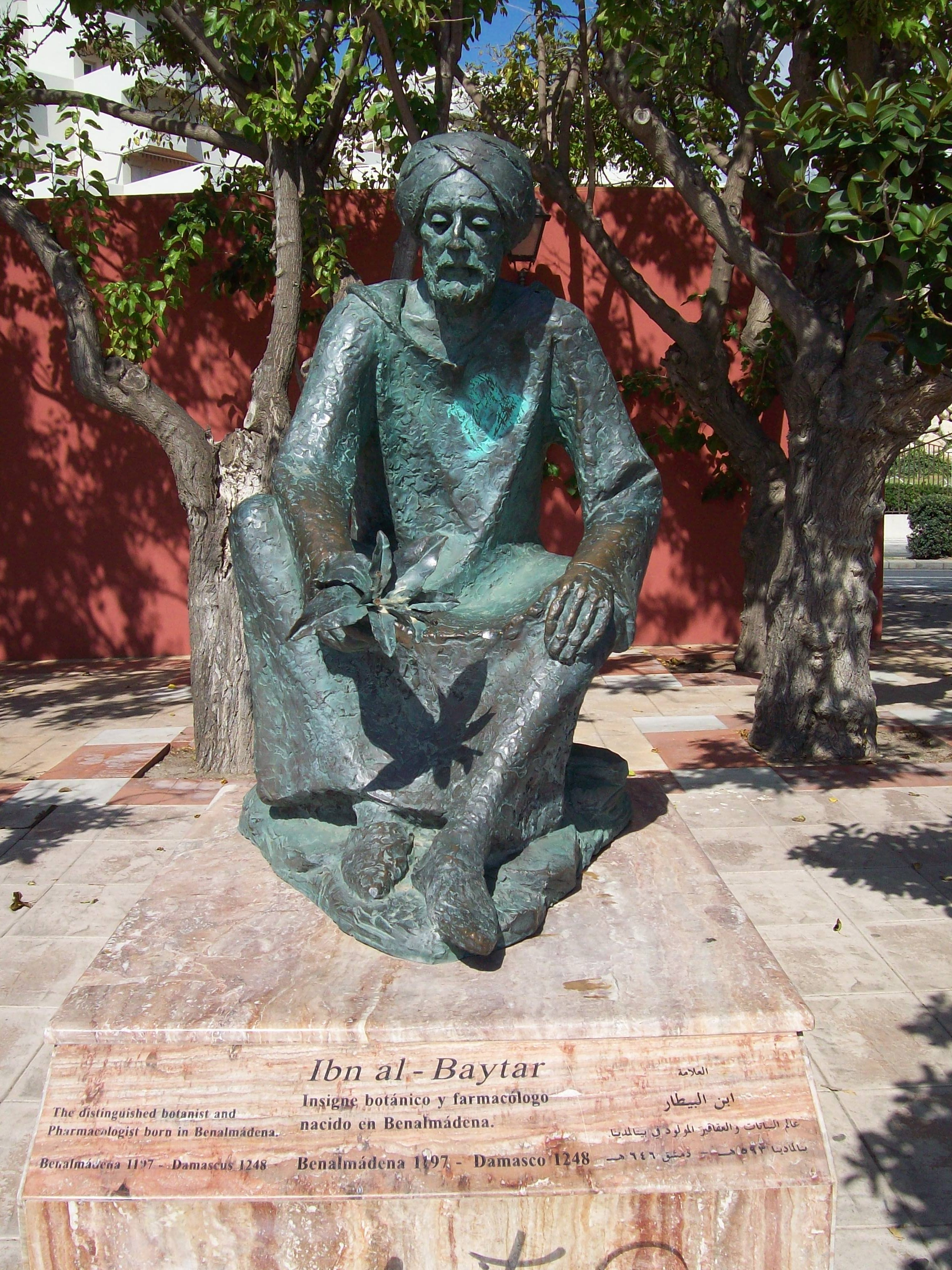
- Statue of Ibn al-Bayṭār in Benalmádena Costa, Spain
- Born: 1197; Málaga, Andalusia, Almohad Caliphate
- Died: 1248 (aged 51); Damascus, Ayyubid dynasty
- Known for: Scientific classification Oncology
- Scientific career
- Fields: Botanist, Scientist, Pharmacist, Physician

Diyāʾ al-Dīn Abū Muḥammad ʿAbd Allāh ibn Aḥmad al-Mālaqī, commonly known as Ibn al-Bayṭār (Arabic: ابن البيطار) (1197–1248 AD) was an Andalusian Arab physician, botanist, pharmacist and scientist. His main contribution was to systematically record the additions made by Islamic physicians in the Middle Ages, which added between 300 and 400 types of medicine to the one thousand previously known since antiquity. He was a student of Abu al-Abbas al-Nabati.

== Life ==
Ibn al-Baitar was born in the city of Málaga in al-Andalus, Almohad Caliphate (now Province of Málaga, Spain) at the end of the twelfth century, hence his nisba "al-Mālaqī". His name "Ibn al-Baitar" is Arabic for "son of the veterinarian", which was his father's profession. Ibn al-Bayṭār learned botany from the Málagan botanist Abū al-ʿAbbās al-Nabātī with whom he started collecting plants in and around Spain.

In 1219, Ibn al-Bayṭār left Málaga, travelling to the coast of North Africa and as far as Anatolia, to collect plants. The major stations he visited include Marrakesh, Bugia, Constantinople, Tunis, Tripoli, Barqa and Antalya.

After 1224, he entered the service of the Ayyubid Sultan al-Kāmil and was appointed chief herbalist. In 1227 al-Kāmil extended his domination to Damascus (now Syria), and Ibn al-Bayṭār accompanied him there, which provided him an opportunity to collect plants in Syria. His botanical researches extended over a vast area including Arabia and Palestine. He died in Damascus in 1248.

Ibn al-Bayṭār used the name "snow of China" (in Arabic, thalj al-Ṣīn) to describe saltpetre while writing about gunpowder.

== Works ==
=== Kitāb al-Jāmiʿ li-Mufradāt al-Adwiya wa-l-Aghdhiya ===
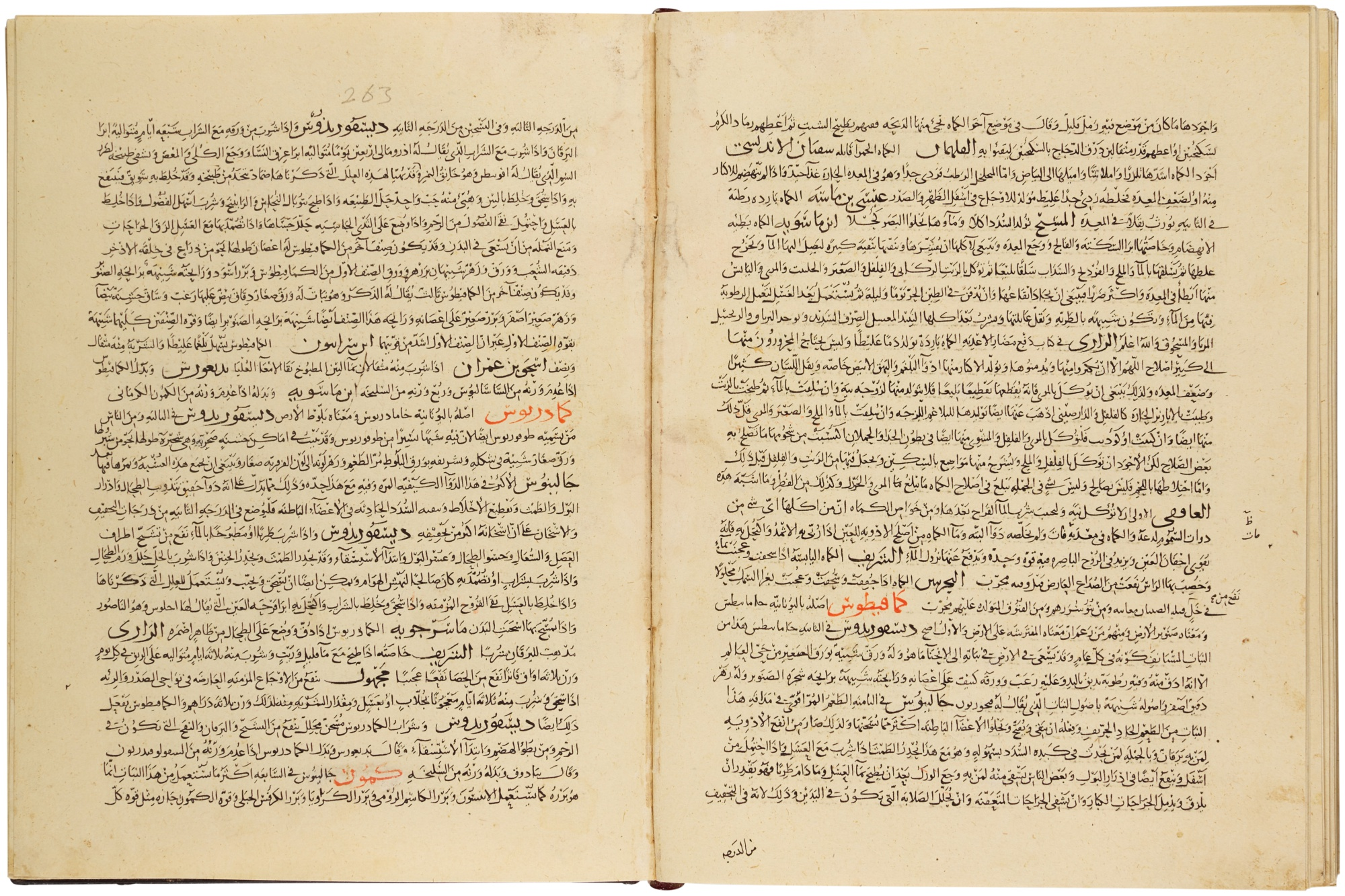
Copy of Ibn al-Baytar's Kitab al-jami' li-mufradat al-adwiyah wa'l-aghdhiyah, Near East, dated c. 1300

Ibn al-Bayṭār's largest and most widely read book is his Compendium on Simple Medicaments and Foods (Arabic: كتاب الجامع لمفردات الأدوية والأغذية). It is a pharmacopoeia (pharmaceutical encyclopedia) listing 1400 plants, foods, and drugs, and their uses. It is organized alphabetically by the name of the useful plant or plant component or other substance—a small minority of the items covered are not botanicals. For each item, Ibn al-Bayṭār makes one or two brief remarks himself and gives brief extracts from a handful of different earlier authors about the item. The bulk of the information is compiled from the earlier authors. The book contains references to 150 previous Arabic authors, as well as 20 previous Greek authors. One of the sources he quotes most frequently is the Materia Medica" of Dioscorides who was inspired by Magon, another Amazigh, having also written an Arabic commentary on the work. Another book often cited by him is Book Two of the Canon of Medicine of Ibn Sīnā (Avicenna). Both of those sources have similarities in layout and subject matter with Ibn al-Bayṭār's own book, but Ibn al-Bayṭār's treatments are richer in detail, and a large minority of Ibn al-Bayṭār's useful plants or plant substances are not covered at all by Dioscorides or Ibn Sīnā. In modern printed edition, the book is more than 900 pages long. As well as in Arabic, it was published in full in translation in German and French in the 19th century.

Ibn al-Bayṭār provides detailed chemical information on the rosewater and orangewater production. He mentions: The scented shurub (syrup) was often extracted from flowers and rare leaves, by means of using hot oils and fat, they were later cooled in cinnamon oil. The oils used were also extracted from sesame and olives. Essential oil was produced by joining various retorts, the steam from these retorts condensed, combined and its scented droplets were used as perfume and mixed to produce the most costly medicines.

=== Kitāb al-Mughnī fī al-Adwiya al-Mufrada ===
Ibn al-Bayṭār's second major work is Kitāb al-Mughnī fī al-Adwiya al-Mufrada, كتاب المغني في الأدوية المفردة .an encyclopedia of Islamic medicine which incorporates his knowledge of plants used extensively for the treatment of various ailments, including diseases related to the head, ear, eye, etc.

=== Other works ===
- Mīzān al-Ṭabīb.ميزان الطبيب
- Risāla fī l-Aghdhiya wa-l-Adwiya.
- Maqāla fī al-Laymūn, Treatise on the Lemon (also attributed to Ibn Jumayʿ); translated into Latin by Andrea Alpago as Ebn Bitar de malis limonis (Venice 1593).
- Tafsīr Kitāb Diyāsqūrīdūs, a commentary on the first four books of Dioscorides' "Materia Medica."

== See also ==
- Islamic science
- Islamic medicine
- Islamic scholars
