= Sa'id al-Afghani =

Sa'id al-Afghani was a professor of Arabic language and literature at the University of Damascus. He was regarded as one of the 20th century's leading scholars in both fields.

== Life ==
Afghani was born in Damascus in 1911 to an Afghan father and a Syrian mother. Having been born in an Arab country, Afghani spoke the language as his mother tongue and was eventually appointed to the position of professor of the Arabic language and later dean of the faculty of arts at the University of Damascus. He also taught at universities in Jordan, Libya and Saudi Arabia. Afghani died on February 18, 1997, in Mecca, where he was buried.

== Works ==
Afghani's most well-known work is al-Mujaz, a book attempting to simplify Arabic grammar for those unfamiliar with the language. He was a strong supporter of reforming the way in which Arabic grammar was understood and taught, blaming traditionalists and their opposition to any reform for the failure of language education in Arab countries. In Afghani's view, opposition from traditionalists such as the Arab Academy of Damascus stifled efforts of reform-minded bodies such as the Academy of the Arabic Language in Cairo. Afghani was instrumental in the founding of Al-Arabi, a magazine showcasing the arts and culture of the Arab World.

Afghani also spent ten years composing a biography of Aisha, the Muslim prophet Muhammad's second or third wife; the book was noted for Afghani's views on women in Islam, which Moroccan feminist writer Fatema Mernissi described as representative of all the Muslim world's most conservative views. Afghani was also learned in the field of Islamic studies, devoting much attention to the aspects of Muslim jurisprudence. On both language and religion, he wrote very little, seeing that books should only be written if there was a clear need for research on the given topic. Being a follower of the Zahirite school of Islamic law, Afghani devoted much attention to preserving and commenting on the works of Ibn Hazm, one of the school's champions. Afghani's 1960 published edition of Ibn Hazm's Mulakhkhas, an important work of Zahirite legal theory, is considered a key moment in Arab intellectual history and the modernist revival of Ibn Hazm's legal method. In Hadith studies, Afghani was a student of Habib Al-Rahman Al-Azmi.

=== Edited works ===
- Ibn Hazm, Mulakhkhas Ibtal al-Qiyas wa al-Ra'y wa al-Istihsan wa al-Taqlid wa al-Ta'lil. Damascus: University of Damascus Press, 1960.
- Ibn Muhanna, Tarikh Darayya. Damascus: al-Majma' al-'Ilmi al-'Arabi, 1950.

=== Original works ===
- A'isha wa-al-Siyasse. Beirut: Dār al-Fikr, 1971.
- al-Müjaz fī qawāʻid al-lughah al-ʻarabīyah. Beirut: Dār al-Fikr, 1969. Arabic. OCLC number 30066819
- Fi usul an-nahw. Damascus, 1951.
- Hadir al-luga al-Arabiyya fi as-sam. Cairo, 1962.
- Ibn Hazm wa Risalatuhu al-Mufadhala baina al-Sahaba. Beirut: Dār al-Fikr, 1969.
