= Ibn Dihya al-Kalby =

Andalusi scholar (1150–1235)

- Born: March 1150; València, Second Taifa of València
- Died: November 1235 (aged 85); Cairo, Ayyubī Sultanate

Philosophical work
- Era: Medieval Era
- Region: Iberian Peninsula and North Africa
- School: Zahiri

Umar bin al-Hasan bin Ali bin Muhammad bin al-Jamil bin Farah bin Khalaf bin Qumis bin Mazlal bin Malal bin Badr bin Dihyah bin Farwah, better known as Ibn Dihya al-Kalbi (Arabic: ابن دحية الكلبي) was an Andalusī scholar of both the Arabic language and Islamic studies. He preferred to be called Abu al-Khattab, though at various times he was also referred to as Ibn al-Jumayyil, Majd al-Din, Abu al-Fadl or simply Ibn Dihya.

== Lineage ==
Kalbi claimed paternal descent from a prominent companion of the Islamic prophet Muhammad and maternal descent from Muhammad himself. Kalbi's father traced his roots back to early Muslim diplomat Dihyah al-Kalbi of the Banu Kalb tribe, while his mother traced hers back to the forth Caliph Ali ibn Abi Talib through his son – and Muhammad's grandson – Hussein ibn Ali. From his mother Amat Allah, he traced his maternal bloodline through Abu Abdillah bin Abul-Bassam Musa bin Abdullah bin al-Hussein bin Ja'far bin Ali bin Muhammad bin Ali bin Musa bin Ja'far bin Muhammad bin Ali bin al-Hussein bin Ali bin Abi Talib; the attribution to Muhammad, at that point in the line, is also maternal as Ali was married to Muhammad's daughter Fatimah.

Kalbi's lineage was not universally accepted. While biographer Ibn Khallikan accepted the conventional telling of Kalbi's family line, historian al-Dhahabi disputed Kalbi's claim, making a counter claim that the latter's family tree could not be substantiated.

== Biography ==
=== Early life ===
While Ibn Diyha is generally acknowledged to have been born in Valencia, conflicting reports have been given regarding Kalbi's exact date of birth. Ibn Khallikan held the view that Kalbi was born in March 1150, despite the fact that he was personally informed by Kalbi's son and nephew that Kalbi was born in February 1152.

Kalbi initially pursued the study of Islamic Prophetic traditions in Spain, visiting every major city in the country and learning from their scholars and academics. In order to further his studies, he traveled from Al-Andalus to Marrakesh, Morocco. Later, his study of Prophetic traditions took him through to Tunis in the year 590AH, then through Africa and on to Egypt, the Levant, Baghdad, Erbil and Wasit in Iraq, and Isfahan and Nisapur in Greater Khorasan. Kalbi was a student of Ibn Maḍāʾ, chief judge of the Almohad Caliphate, and held immense respect for his teacher, who he referred to as "leader of all grammarians."

=== Career ===
In addition to his renown as a linguistic scholar, Kalbi was also considered to be from the scholars of Prophetic narrations, which was actually his primary focus of study, despite his fame primarily being for his knowledge of Arabic grammar and philology. His number of students was considered high and his chain of narration is recognized by later scholars of the field. A number of these later scholars also narrated either directly from him or through his chain, such as Ibn al-Salah.

While in Andalus, Kalbi was appointed as the judge of Dénia by the Almohads, but stepped down after public reaction to his sentencing a convict to cruel and unusual punishment. After his resignation, he sought further education in the Muslim east. After studying Sahih Muslim in Tunis in 1198, he performed the Hajj at Mecca and spent some time in Egypt. He sought further knowledge in the field of hadith in Syria, Iraq, Persia as far east as Nisapur before returning to Egypt.

Kalbi taught the Ayyubid Sultan Al-Kamil basic academic subjects and proper etiquette during the latter's youth. Later in life, Al-Kamil built an entire school for Kalbi to teach and pursue the study of Prophetic narrations. Al-Kamil would eventually replace Kalbi with his older brother Abu Amr bin Dihya al-Kalbi, also an expert in the Arabic language, as the director of the school, a position which the older brother held until his own death.

=== Death ===
Kalbi died in Cairo on Tuesday, the 14th of the Islamic calendar month Rabi' al-awwal, in the Hijri year 633, corresponding to November 1235. He was roughly 89 years old according to the Islamic calendar, and 86 years old according to the Gregorian calendar. His death was during Ayyubid rule in what is now Egypt.

He was buried at the foot of the Mokattam mountain range outside of Cairo. His older brother, Abu Amr, died almost two years later in January 1237; he also died on a Tuesday, and was buried at the foot of the same mountain range.

Evaluation of Kalbi's contribution to Islamic studies has been difficult due to his controversial nature among Muslim historians during the Middle Ages. Critics in the Muslim east have accused Kalbi of plagiarism and dishonesty, while those in the Muslim west praised Kalbi highly and referenced his education and efforts in learning.

== Works ==
At the request Al-Kamil, he wrote his most famous work: "al-Motrib min Ashaar Ahl al-Maghrib" "Arabic: المطرب من أشعار أهل المغرب" (loosely translated: Rhymes from the poetry of the people of the Maghreb) which was a collection of short biographies of the poets of Al-Andalus and Morocco, including their most famous poems. He also wrote "al-Tanwir fi Mawlid al-Bashir al-Nadhir" about the birthday of Muhammad. His work preserved some of the oral traditions of the time as well as details of the poets' lives.
