= Muhammad bin Dawud al-Zahiri =

Iraqi theologian and scholar (c. 868–909)

Muhammad ibn Dawud

Personal life
- Born: c. 868 CE
- Died: 909 (aged 40–41)
- Region: Mesopotamia
- Main interest(s): Fiqh, Theology, Mysticism

Religious life
- Religion: Islam
- Denomination: Sunni
- Jurisprudence: Zahiri

Muslim leader
- Influenced by: Dawud al-Zahiri, Niftawayh
- Influenced: Qadi al-Nu'man, Muhammad ibn Jarir al-Tabari, Ibn al-Mughallis

Abu Bakr Muhammad ibn Dawud al-Zahiri, Abū Bakr Muḥammad ibn Dāwūd al-Iṣbahānī, also known as Avendeath, was a medieval theologian and scholar of the Arabic language and Islamic law. He was one of the early propagators of his father Dawud al-Zahiri's method in jurisprudence, Zahirism.

== Life ==
=== Youth and education ===
Ibn Dawud was born in Baghdad in the year 255 according to the Islamic calendar, corresponding roughly to the year 868 according to the Gregorian calendar. By the age of seven, he had memorized the entire Qur'an by heart. By the age of ten, he was already an exemplary student in the fields of Arabic grammar, lexicography, and Arabic literature under his teacher Niftawayh, himself a student of Ibn Dawud's father. Regarding the variant readings of the Qur'an, Ibn Dawud learned from Al-Duri, a student of Abu 'Amr ibn al-'Ala', one of the ten primary transmitters of the Qur'an. Ibn Dawud's classmate, Muhammad ibn Jarir al-Tabari, also learned the Qur'an from the same study circle in addition to having been a student of Ibn Dawud's father, suggesting a close relationship early on, despite their later rivalry.

Ibn Dawud's relationship with his father was complex. As a child, Ibn Dawud was bullied by other children, being given the name "poor little sparrow." When he complained to his father about the nickname, his father insisted that names of people and things are predestined by God; there was no reason to analyze the meaning of names to know that they had been established. His father then actually affirmed the nickname given by the other children, emphasizing that all things occur according to divine will. While Ibn Dawud told his father that he was as mean as the other children were for laughing at his son, it is not known if this episode continued to affect Ibn Dawud into adulthood, or if this was characteristic of the entire father-son relationship.

=== Academia and judiciary ===
Upon his father's death in 884, Ibn Dawud took up Dawud's teaching position in Baghdad. Despite being only fifteen years old, he was still considered an outstanding jurist, and the four-hundred or so students of his father became his own students. Ibn Dawud had a tendency to speak using Saj', a form of Arabic rhymed prose, in everyday speech. This caused difficulty for many who sought verdicts from him, though it is not regarded as having lessened his popularity.

Some years after his teaching position, the Abbasid administration appointed him to a judicial post in western Baghdad.

=== Death ===
Although Ibn Dawud is generally considered to have died young, his exact date of death has been a matter of some dispute. Masudi recorded Ibn Dawud's death at 296 Hijri, corresponding to 908 or 909 Gregorian. The Encyclopaedia of Islam records his death as 294 Hijri and 909 Gregorian, yet the two dates do not match. Ibn Khallikan recorded Ibn Dawud's death as Ramadan 9, 297 Hijri, or 22 May 910 Gregorian. While the exact cause of death is not known, Ibn Dawud proclaimed a deathbed confession to his teacher Niftawayh that he was dying of a broken heart, due to a forbidden love for another man. The topic of Ibn Dawud's affections has been the topic of much discussion, as his confession of such feelings is unique among Muslim theologians even up to the present era.

The setting of his death has been perhaps the most vividly described piece of his biography. During his final moments, Ibn Dawud lied on a bed between the light filtering in through the grated window and the empty space of the floor as a blind nightingale sang in a gilded cage nearby; he was described as weary with regrets, yet also serene in his last moments. His body was ritually washed by his student Ibn al-Mughallis according to Islamic funeral rites.

== Philosophy ==
Ibn Dawud was an opponent of using analogical reason and juristic preference in Muslim jurisprudence. At the same time, Ibn Dawud still upheld the validity of using inference in order to deduce religious verdicts. The same views were held by his father, whom Ibn Dawud followed in his Zahirite religious views.

Ibn Dawud also rejected the notion that verdicts of the first generation of Muslims could constitute a source of law. This position is not specific to the Zahirite rite, being the preferred view of the Shafi'ites as well.

== Theology ==
Like his father, Ibn Dawud has not left theological works which have survived to the modern era. Ibn Dawud was known to have been involved in public debates with the Mu'tazila, an ancient Muslim sect, in a court of the caliph Al-Muwaffaq in Wasit. This is not surprising considering the Mu'tazilites ill reception of Ibn Dawud's father, in whose footsteps Ibn Dawud followed, and the scorn which the Mu'taziltes heaped upon Zahirites in general. More is known about what Ibn Dawud opposed theologically rather than what he himself believed.

=== Nature of the soul ===
In his book on love, Ibn Dawud quoted Greek playwright Aristophanes who, according to Plato's Symposium, held the view that the soul of a person who had fallen in love was actually only half a soul. In this view, the bodies of two people in love were each given only half of the same soul by God. Later writers have mistaken this for being Ibn Dawud's own belief, though modern scholarship has shown that he was merely quoting the speech of philosophers in an almost derisive way rather than ascribing to the belief himself. Ibn Dawud's own beliefs regarding the soul were never actually stated, and were likely no different from those held by the rest of Islamic orthodoxy at the time.

=== Anathematisation of al-Hallaj ===
In 901, he declared the mystic Mansur Al-Hallaj as a heretic in a well-known verdict. Initially, Ibn Dawud's appeal to the caliph Al-Mu'tadid was not heeded, and Hallaj was able to continue preaching his ideas for a time. It is likely, however, that Ibn Dawud's verdict was one contributing factor to the caliph Al-Muqtadir's ordering of Hallaj's execution.

== Reception ==
Historically, Shi'ite writers and especially Ismaili Shi'ites have criticized Ibn Dawud for rejecting the usage of analogical reason and juristic preference in religious verdicts while affirming inference. Fatimid historian Qadi al-Nu'man was particularly scathing, accusing Ibn Dawud and his father of contradicting themselves.

== Works ==
=== Jurisprudence ===
Ibn Dawud composed a book on the topic of the principles of Muslim jurisprudence titled The Path to Knowledge of Jurisprudence. It was one of the earliest works on the subject after Shafi'i's Risala, and the primary basis for Nu'man's Differences Among the Schools of Law, despite Nu'man's criticisms of Ibn Dawud. Yaqut al-Hamawi mentions that in a chapter of the book regarding juristic consensus, Ibn Dawud criticizes his former companion Tabari as having contradictory views on the subject. Like Ibn Dawud's other works, The Path has not survived on complete form to the modern era; however, large tracts of it are quoted in other works and modern scholarship suggests that al-Nu'man's Differences was derived from Ibn Dawud's book. Despite their differences in opinion, Tabari's own work on the principles of jurisprudence, The Clarification of the Principles of Verdicts, was strongly resemblant of The Path of Ibn Dawud and the works of Dawud's father, rather than Shafi'is work or even post-9th century works on the topic. This not only contradicts the common theme within the genre, but also implies similarities between the extant yet non-mainstream Zahirite school of law, and the extinct Jariri school.

In addition to The Path, Masudi and Ibn al-Nadim both attribute three other works to Ibn Dawud within the field of Muslim jurisprudence: the Book of Admonishment, the Book of Excuse and the Book of Refutation. The latter book includes another critique of the views Tabari.

=== Divine Love ===
In the late 9th century, Ibn Dawud composed his book Kitab al-Zahra while in his native city of Baghdad. His work is considered to be one of the first Arabic language works on the theory of love, though only the first half is concerned with this: the second half is an anthology of poetry. Ibn Duraid, who authored the second ever comprehensive dictionary of the language, ranked this book along with the treatises on love by Ibn Abi Tahir Tayfur and Ibn Qutaybah as the three most important works for one who wanted to become eloquent in speaking and writing. The book is organized as an anthology, with each chapter headed by an appropriate aphorism and being devoted to various phenomena relating to the true meaning of love. Although he wrote from more of a humanistic perspective than a theological one, Ibn Dawud's piety was apparent, as chastity was a common theme. Chapter eight of the book, "A refined person will be chaste," is opened with an alleged quote from the prophet Muhammad in praise of admirers who keep their affections secret. Similarly, the opening chapter is titled "he whose glances are many, his sorrows are prolonged," indicating a belief that pursuing multiple objects of affection will yield negative results. The martyrdom of chastity is a repeated theme, as is Ibn Dawud's denial of the possibility of divine-human mutual love.

Incomplete portions of the book are still extant today, though not widely available.

== Editions ==
- Ibn Dāwūd al-Iṣfahānī, Abū Bakr Muḥammad b. Abī Sulaymān [sic!], Kitab al-Zahrah, The Book of the Flower, first half. Eds. A.R. Nykl and Ibrāhīm Tūqān. Chicago: University of Chicago Press, 1932. (A critical edition of chapters 1–50.)
- Abū Bakr Muḥammad ibn Dāwūd al-Isfahānī, An-niṣf al-ṯānī min Kitāb az-Zahra, ed. by Ibrāhīm al-Sāmarrāʾī and Nūrī al-Qaysī, Baghdād 1975. (Chapters 50–100.)
- Abū Bakr Muḥammad ibn Dawud al-Iṣbahānī, al-Zahrah, ed. by Ibrāhīm al-Samarrā’ī and Nūrī Ḥamūdī al-Qaysī, 2 vols (al-Zarqā', Jordan: Maktabat al-Manār, 1985). (Chapters 1–100.)
- Kitāb az-Zahra. Parte seconda (Capitoli LI–LV), ed. Michele Vallaro (Naples 1985). (Critical edition of chapters 51–55.)

== Bibliography ==
- Giffen, Lois Anita. Theory of Profane Love Among the Arabs: The Development of the Genre. New York: 1971.
- Nasser, Iyas. "The Traditional Qaṣīda and Kitāb al-Zahra by Ibn Dāwūd al-Iṣfahānī", Journal of Arabic Literature 53 (2022), pp. 132–153.
- W. Raven, Ibn Dâwûd al-Isbahânî and his Kitâb al-Zahra (Diss. Leiden), Amsterdam 1989.
- W. Raven, „The manuscripts and editions of Muḥammad ibn Dāwūd’s Kitāb al-Zahra,“ in Manucripts of the Middle East 4 (1989), 133–37.
