= Niftawayh =

Islamic scholar and author (died 935)

- Title: The Grammarian

Personal life
- Born: 858 or 864 Wasit
- Died: 935 (aged 76–77) Baghdad
- Resting place: Kufa
- Region: Mesopotamia
- Main interest(s): Arabic grammar, Arabic literature
- Occupation: Linguist, Poet, Historian

Religious life
- Religion: Islam
- Denomination: Sunni
- Jurisprudence: Zahiri

Muslim leader
- Influenced by: Dawud al-Zahiri, Sibawayh
- Influenced: Muhammad bin Dawud al-Zahiri, Al-Masudi

Abu Abd Allah Ibrahim ibn Muhammad ibn 'Urfa ibn Sulayman ibn al-Mughira ibn Habib ibn al-Muhallab ibn Abi Sufra al-Azdi (Arabic: أبو عبد الله إبراهيم بن محمّد بن عرفة العَتَكيّ الأزديّ) better known as Nifṭawayh, (Note: Arabic: نفطويه) was a Medieval Muslim scholar. He was considered to be the best writer of his time, in addition to an expert in Muslim prophetic tradition and comparative readings of the Qur'an.

== Life ==
Niftawayh was born in Wasit in what is now Iraq. His date of birth is most commonly held to be 858, though the year 864 has been suggested as well. He spent most of his life in Baghdad, where he died on a Wednesday in the month of Safar just an hour after sunrise in the year 935. He was buried at the gate of Kufa the next day. His date of death carries some dispute as well, with some historians suggesting that he died in the year 936 on the same day as Abu Bakr Ibn Mujāhid.

He taught lexicography while in Baghdad. He wrote a history book which, according to his student Al-Masudi, was considered to be one of the most useful of the time.

Ibn Khalawayh holds that Niftawayh was the only Muslim scholar with the first name Ibrahim who had a son named Abdullah. According to Tha'ālibī, Niftawayh was called for two reasons. First, his knowledge of the Arabic language was unparalleled in his time, as was Sibawayh's during his. Niftawayh possessed an intense interest in Sibawayh's works in grammar, to the point where the former was even referred to as the latter's son. Second, his complexion was of a very dark color and his appearance was compared to asphalt, known as "nift." Thus, the words "nift" and "wayh" were combined and he was known as "Niftawayh al-Nahwi," or Niftawayh the grammarian.

== Views ==
Niftawayh was a follower of the Zahirite rite of Muslim jurisprudence, having been a student of Dawud al-Zahiri. He rejected analogical reason not only as a means for deriving religious verdicts, but also as a poetic device. None of his works on religious topics are known to have survived to the modern era. Alongside Muhammad bin Dawud al-Zahiri, the son of his teacher in jurisprudence, Niftawayh was also a student of the canonical Qur'an reciter Al-Duri.

Niftawayh held very positive views of the fifth Abbasid Caliph Harun al-Rashid. Niftawayh remarked on the caliph's support of theologians and artists, though he also noted that the caliph later regretted much of his own extravagance in regard to his court's spending. In contrast, he clashed with his contemporary Ibn Duraid, who had written the second dictionary of the Arabic language ever. Niftawayh accused Ibn Duraid of merely plagiarizing the work of Al-Khalil ibn Ahmad al-Farahidi, who had written the first Arabic dictionary, Kitab al-'Ayn.

== Reception ==
Niftawayh was intensely disliked by the Mu'tazila, an ancient sect of Islam active during his life. While Sunnis and Mu'tazila were hostile to each other in general, Niftawayh's Zahirite views along with his methods in teaching grammar were, in the view of the Mu'tazila, of the "utmost ignorance."

== Works ==
=== Poetry ===
Abu Ali al-Kali quotes some verses which Niftawayh had written for an anonymous woman in Kali's own book al-Amali:

My heart fixed on thee, is more tender than thy cheeks;
My strength is less than the power of thine eyes!
Why wilt thou not pity him whose soul is unjustly tortured,
and whom love inclineth towards thee with affection?
