= Zahiri school =

Legal school in Sunni Islam

The Zahiri school (Note: Arabic: ظاهرية, romanized: al-Ẓāhiryya) or Zahirism, also known as Ahl al-Dhahir or Ahl al-Wahi, is a school of Islamic jurisprudence within Sunni Islam. The school's name derives from the Arabic dhāhir (ظاهر), meaning "apparent" or "manifest", reflecting its emphasis on the apparent meaning of the Qur'ān and Sunnah. Dawud al-Zahiri, one of its earliest proponents, likewise took his epithet from this approach. The school flourished in Spain during the Caliphate of Córdoba under the leadership of Ibn Hazm. It was also followed by the majority of Muslims in Mesopotamia, Portugal, the Balearic Islands, and North Africa. The Zahiri school lost its presence around the 14th-century. The school is considered to be endangered, but it continues to exert influence over legal thought. Today it is followed by minority communities in Morocco and Pakistan.

The Zahiri school is characterized by strict adherence to textual evidence and reliance on the outward (ẓāhir) meaning of expressions in the Quran and a limited amount of ḥadīth literature; the consensus (ijmāʿ) of the first generation of Muhammad's closest companions (ṣaḥāba) excluding the scholars, for sources of Islamic law (sharīʿa); and rejection of analogical deduction (qiyās) and societal custom or knowledge (urf), used by other schools of Islamic jurisprudence, although the anti-Hazm wing of Zahiris sometimes accept Qiyas Al Jali and usually religious inference (istidlāl).

After a limited success and decline in the Middle East, the Zahiri school flourished in Islamic Iberia, particularly under the leadership of the Andalusian Muslim jurist Ibn Hazm. The Zahiri school is said to have lingered on in various locations under various manifestations before being superseded by the Hanbali school.

== History ==
=== Emergence ===
During his formative years, al-Ẓāhirī relocated from Kufa to Baghdad and studied the prophetic traditions (ḥadīth) and Quranic exegesis (tafsīr) with a number of notable Muslim scholars of the time, including Abū Thawr, Yaḥyā ibn Maʿīn, and Aḥmad ibn Ḥanbal. His study under renowned figures of traditionalist theology (Atharī) was in contrast to the views of his father, who was a follower of the Ḥanafī school. Indian Muslim reformist Chiragh Ali has suggested that Ẓāhirī's school was, like that of Ibn Ḥanbal, actually a direct reaction to the Ḥanafī system of jurisprudence.

The Ẓāhirī school was initially called the Dāwūdi school after Dawud al-Ẓāhirī himself, and attracted many adherents, although they felt free to criticize his views, in line with the Ẓāhirī school's rejection of legal conformity (taqlīd). Alongside the Ḥanbali jurists, Ẓāhiris constituted one of the major schools that originated from the Ahl al-Ḥadīth school, which advocated the superiority of the Quran, ḥadīth literature, and sunnah (accounts of the sayings and living habits attributed to the Islamic prophet Muhammad during his lifetime) in legal jurisdiction, and denied the validity of logic (‘āql) as an independent source of Islamic law. By the end of the 10th century, members of the madhhab were appointed as judges (qāḍī) in Baghdad, Shiraz, Isfahan, Firuzabad, Ramla, Damascus, Fustat, and Bukhara.

Umm al-Qura University professor Abdul Aziz al-Harbi has argued that the first generation of Muhammad's closest companions (ṣaḥāba) followed the methods and rulings of the Ẓāhirī school, and therefore it can be regarded as "the school of the first generation."

=== Westward expansion ===
Parallel to the school's development in the east, Ẓāhirī ideas were introduced to North Africa by theologians of the Maliki school who were engaged in lively debates with the Hanafi school, and to the Iberian Peninsula by one of Dawud al-Ẓāhirī's direct students. Unlike Abbasid lands, where the Ẓāhirī school developed in parallel and in opposition to other madhhabs (chiefly Hanafi, Shafi‘i, and Hanbali), in the West it only had to contend with its Maliki counterpart, which enjoyed official support of the Umayyad rulers. Starting in the late 9th century CE, an increasing number of "hir" scholars emerged in various regions of the Iberian peninsula, but none of their works have survived.

It was not until the rise of the Almohads that the Ẓāhirī school enjoyed official state sponsorship. While not all of the Almohad political leaders were Ẓāhirīs, a large plurality of them were not only adherents but were well-versed theologians in their own right. Additionally, all Almohad leaders – both the religiously learned and the laymen – were extremely hostile toward the Malikis, giving the Ẓāhirīs and in a few cases the Shafi‘is free rein to author works and run the judiciary. In the late 12th century, any religious material written by non-Ẓāhirīs was at first banned and later burned in the empire under the Almohad reforms.

=== Decline ===
The Ẓāhirī school enjoyed its widest expansion and prestige in the fourth Islamic century, especially through the works of Ibn al-Mughallis, but in the fifth century it lost ground to the Hanbalite school. Even after the Zahiri school became extinct in Baghdad, it continued to have some followers in Shiraz. Ẓāhirism maintained its prestige in Syria until 788 A.H. and had an even longer and deeper impact in Egypt. In the 14th century C.E., the Zahiri Revolt marked both a brief rekindling of interest in the school's ideas as well as affirmation of its status as a non-mainstream ideology. Al-Muhalla, a medieval manual on Ẓāhirī jurisprudence, served in part as inspiration for the revolt and as a primary source of the school's positions. However, soon afterwards the school ceased to function and in the 14th century Ibn Khaldun considered it to be extinct. With the Reconquista and the loss of Iberia to Christian rule, most works of Ẓāhirī law and legal theory were lost as well, with the school only being carried on by individual scholars, once again on the periphery.

Wael Hallaq has argued that the rejection of qiyas (analogical reasoning) in Ẓāhirī methodology led to exclusion of the school from the Sunni juridical consensus and ultimately its extinction in the pre-modern era. Christopher Melchert suggests that the association of the Ẓāhirī school with Mu'tazilite theology, its difficulty in attracting the right patronage, and its reliance on outmoded methods of teaching have all contributed to its decline.

=== Modern history ===
The Zahiri school became extinct around the 14th-century. It was sometimes characterized as a fifth school of thought (madhhab) within Sunni Islam, In particular, members of the Ahl-i Hadith movement have identified themselves with the Ẓāhirī school of thought. In the modern era, the Ẓāhirī school has been described as "somewhat influential", though "not formally operating today". In particular, adherents of the modern-day Ahl-i Hadith movement in India and Pakistan have self-consciously emulated the ideas of the Ẓāhirī school and identified themselves with it. The family of Hasan al-Hudaybi reportedly was Zahiri. Modernist revival of the general critique by Ibn Hazm – the school's most prominent representative – of Islamic legal theory among Muslim academics has seen several key moments in recent Arab intellectual history, including Ahmad Shakir's republishing of Al-Muhalla, Muhammad Abu Zahra's biography of Ibn Hazm, and the republishing of archived epistles on Ẓāhirī legal theory by Sa'id al-Afghani in 1960 and Ihsan Abbas between 1980 and 1983. In 2004 the Amman Message recognized the Ẓāhirī school as legitimate, although it did not include it among Sunni madhhabs, and the school also received recognition from Sudan's former Islamist Prime Minister, Sadiq al-Mahdi. The literalist school of thought represented by the Ẓāhirī madhhab remains prominent among many scholars and laymen associated with the Salafi movement, and traces of it can be found in the modern-day Salafi movement. The school experienced a revival in the Islamic State. There have been attempts to revive the school in the mid-20th century.

== Principles ==
Of the utmost importance to the school is an underlying principle attributed to the founder Dawud ibn 'Ali; who had robustly denounced the delicacies and ambiguities in Fiqh sciences. According to Dawud, the validity of religious issues is only upheld by certainty, and that speculation cannot lead to the truth. This certainty is to be determined by the outward (Zahir) meaning of the Qurʾān and Hadith. Most Ẓāhirī principles return to this overarching maxim. Japanese Islamic scholar Kojiro Nakamura defines the Ẓāhirī schools as resting on two presumptions. The first is that if it were possible to draw more general conclusions from the strict reading of the sources of Islamic law, then God certainly would have expressed these conclusions already; thus, all that is necessary lies in the text. The second is that for man to seek the motive behind the commandments of God is not only a fruitless endeavor but a presumptuous one. Another major characteristic was their fierce condemnation of Qiyas (analogical reasoning) as a heresy and distortion of Sharia (Islamic law) but still accept religious inference (istidlāl).

The Ẓāhirī school of thought generally recognizes three sources of Islamic law within the principles of Islamic jurisprudence. The first is the Qur'an, considered by Muslims to be the verbatim word of God (Arabic: الله Allah); the second consists of the Sunnah derived from hadith literature its adherents deem authentic, these consist of the sayings and actions of the Islamic prophet Muhammad; the third is absolute consensus of the Sahabah. Certain followers of the Ẓāhirī school include religious inference (istidlāl) as a fourth source of Islamic law.

The school differs from the more prolific schools of Islamic thought in that it restricts valid consensus in jurisprudence to the consensus of the first generation of Muslims who lived alongside Muhammad only. While Abu Hanifa and Ahmad ibn Hanbal agreed with them in this, most followers of the Hanafi and Hanbali schools generally do not, nor do the other two Sunni schools.

Additionally, the Ẓāhirī school does not accept analogical reasoning as a source of Islamic law, nor do they accept the practice of juristic discretion, pointing to a verse in the Qur'an which declares that nothing has been neglected in the Muslim scriptures. While al-Shafi‘i and followers of his school agree with the Ẓāhirīs in rejecting the juristic discretion, all other Sunni schools accept the analogical reasoning, though at varying levels.

Ẓāhirīs accept deriving rulings based on general, encompassing texts in the Quran and Sunnah as long as it is based on what a general ruling/statement in the textual sources necessarily encompasses and not based on making Qiyas, which pro-Hazm Ẓāhirīs firmly reject but Anti-hazm wing sometimes accept qiyas Al Jali and Mostly allow Religious inference.

=== Distinct rulings ===
- Zahiris consider the Virgin Mary, Sarah, Jochebed, Asiya, Eve, and Hajar, to be female Prophets in Islam.
- Riba, or interest, on hand-to-hand exchanges of gold, silver, dates, salt, wheat and barley are prohibited per Muhammad's injunction, but analogical reasoning is not used to extend that injunction to other agricultural produce as is the case with other schools. The Ẓāhirīs are joined in this by early scholars such as Tawus ibn Kaysan and Qatadah.
- Admission in an Islamic court of law is seen as indivisible by Ẓāhirīs, meaning that a party cannot accept some aspects of the opposing party's testimony and not other parts. The Ẓāhirīs are opposed by the Hanafi and Maliki schools, though a majority of Hanbalites share the Ẓāhirī position.
- In relation to a hadith in which the Prophet is reported to have said: ‘A virgin’s consent (to a marriage proposal) is to stay silent (when asked for her opinion). Ibn Hazm commented: "Therefore, if she says “yes” then her marriage contract is void".
- Another example of the ignoring of analogical reasoning by Ẓāhirīs and how it separates that school from most madhahib, is their attitude towards dogs. Pious Muslims commonly avoid dogs, arguing the hadith -- "If a dog drinks from your bowl then you must wash it seven times"—indicate that dogs are unclean on the grounds that there is no other reason for thoroughly cleaning what dogs have used. Ẓāhirīs, in contrast, maintain that (in the words of one adherent), "if the prophet meant 'the dog is an unclean animal', ... he would have said 'the dog is an unclean animal'"

== Reception ==
Like its founder Dawud, the Ẓāhirī school has been controversial since its inception. Due to their some so-called rejection of intellectual principles considered staples of other strains within Sunni Islam, adherents to the school have been described as displaying non-conformist attitudes.

=== Views on the Ẓāhirī within Sunni Islam ===
The Ẓāhirī school has often been criticized by other schools within Sunni Islam. While this is true of all schools, relations between the Hanafis, Shafi‘is and Malikis have warmed to each other over the centuries; this has not always been the case with the Ẓāhirīs.

Not surprisingly given the conflict over al-Andalus, Maliki scholars have often expressed negative feelings regarding the Ẓāhirī school. Abu Bakr ibn al-Arabi, whose father was a Ẓāhirī, nevertheless considered Ẓāhirī law to be absurd. Ibn 'Abd al-Barr, himself a former Ẓāhirī, excluded Dawud al-Ẓāhirī along with Ahmad ibn Hanbal from his book on Sunni Islam's greatest jurists, though Ignác Goldziher has suggested that Ibn Abdul-Barr remained Ẓāhirī privately and outwardly manifested Maliki ideas due to prevailing pressures at the time. At least with al-Ballūṭī, one example of a Ẓāhirī jurist applying Maliki law due to official enforcement is known. Ẓāhirīs such as Ibn Hazm were challenged and attacked by Maliki jurists after their deaths.

Followers of the Shafi‘i school within Sunni Islam have historically been involved in intellectual conflict with Ẓāhirīs. This may be due to Al-Shafi'i being a major proponent of the principle of Qiyas; rejected by the Zahiris.

Hanbali scholar Ibn al-Qayyim, while himself a critic of the Ẓāhirī outlook, defended the school's legitimacy in Islam, stating rhetorically that their only sin was "following the book of their Lord and example of their Prophet."

=== Zahirism and Sufism ===
The relationship between Ẓāhirism and Sufism has been complicated. Throughout the school's history, its adherents have always included both Sufis as well as harsh critics of Sufism. Many practitioners of Sufism, which often emphasizes detachment from the material world, have been attracted to the Ẓāhirī combination of strict ritualism and lack of emphasis on dogmatics.

== Zahiris ==
Discerning who exactly is an adherent to the Ẓāhirī school of thought can be difficult. Harbi has claimed that most Muslim scholars who practiced independent reasoning and based their judgment only on the Qur'an and Sunnah, or Muslim prophetic tradition, were Ẓāhirīs. Followers of other schools of thought may have adopted certain viewpoints of the Ẓāhirīs, holding Ẓāhirī leanings without actually adopting the Ẓāhirī school; often, these individuals were erroneously referred to as Ẓāhirīs despite contrary evidence.

Additionally, historians would often refer to any individual who praised the Ẓāhirīs as being from them. Sufi mystic Ibn Arabi has most often been referred to as a Ẓāhirī because of a commentary on one of Ibn Hazm's works, despite having stated twice that he isn't a follower of the Ẓāhirī school of thought. Similarly, Muhammad ibn Jarir al-Tabari would include Ẓāhirī opinions when comparing differing views of Sunni Muslims, yet he founded a distinct school of his own. The case of Muslim figures who have mixed between different schools have proven to be more problematic. When Ibn Hazm listed the most important leaders of the school, he listed known Ẓāhiralh bin Qasim, al-Balluti, Ibn al-Mughallis, al-Dibaji and Ruwaym, but then also mentioned Abu Bakr al-Khallal, who despite his Ẓāhirī leanings is universally recognized as a Hanbali.

=== Imam Bukhari ===
Scott Lucas states "The most controversial aspect of al-Bukhari's legal principles is his disapproval of qiyas" and "A modern study of personal status laws in the Arab world by Jamal J. Nasir contains one sentence that explicitly mentions that the Ẓāhirīs and al-Bukhari rejected qiyas..."

Lucas also points out that the legal methodology of Bukhari is very similar to that of Ibn Hazm.

=== Followers of the Ẓāhirī school ===
- Ibn Hazm (died 1064), Andalusian polymath, author of numerous works.
- Abd Allah al-Qaysi (died 885), responsible for spreading the school in Spain.
- Abu l-'Abbās "Ibn Shirshīr" Al-Nāshī Al-Akbar (died 906 CE), prominent kalām theologian and teacher of Niftawayh.
- Muhammad bin Dawud al-Zahiri (died 909), son of the school's namesake.
- Ruwaym (died 915), spiritual pioneer from the second generation of Sufism.
- Niftawayh (died 935), student of the school's namesake and teacher of his son.
- Ibn al-Mughallis (died 936), credited with popularizing the school across the Muslim world.
- Al-Masudi (died 956), early Muslim historian and geographer.
- Mundhir bin Sa'īd al-Ballūṭī (died 966), early judge in Spain for the Caliphate of Córdoba.
- Al-Humaydī (died 1095), hadith scholar, historian and biographer in Spain and then Iraq.
- Ibn al-Qaisarani (died 1113), responsible for canonizing the six hadith books of Sunni Islam.
- Ibn Tumart (died 1130), founder of the Almohad Empire
- Abd al-Mu'min (died 1163), first Almohad Caliph.
- Abu Yaqub Yusuf (died 1184), second Almohad Caliph, memorized Sahih al-Bukhari and Sahih Muslim.
- Ibn Maḍāʾ (died 1196), Andalusian judge and linguist, and an early champion of language education reform.
- Abu Yusuf Yaqub al-Mansur (died 1199), third Almohad Caliph, authored his own collection of hadith.
- Muhammad al-Nasir (died 1213), fourth Almohad Caliph.
- Idris I al-Ma'mun (died 1232), renegade who issued a challenge for the Almohad throne.
- Ibn Dihya al-Kalby (died 1235), hadith scholar from Spain and then Egypt.
- Abu al-Abbas al-Nabati (died 1239), Andalusian botanist, pharmacist and theologian.
- Abu Bakr Ibn Sayyid al-Nās (died 1261), Andalusian-Tunisian scholar of hadith.
- Fatḥ al-Din Ibn Sayyid al-Nās (died 1334), Andalusian-Egyptian biographer of Muhammad.
- Abu Hayyan Al Gharnati (died 1344), Andalusian linguist and Qur'anic exegete.

=== Contemporary Zahiri scholars ===
- Sa'id al-Afghani (died 1997), former Arabic language professor at Damascus University, correspondent member of the Academy of the Arabic Language in Cairo and proponent of language education reform.
- Abu Turab al-Zahiri (died 2002), Indian-born Saudi Arabian linguist, jurist, theologian and journalist.
- Ihsan Abbas (died 2003), Palestinian scholar of Arabic and Islamic studies, widely considered to be at the forefront of both fields during the 20th century.
- Yahya al-Bahrumi (died 2017), American jihadist militant notable for his ideological and material support of the Islamic State
- Abu Abd al-Rahman Ibn Aqil al-Zahiri (living), Saudi Arabian polymath and correspondent member of the Academy of the Arabic Language in Cairo.
- Muhammad Abu Khubza (died 2020), Moroccan polymath, authored the library catalog for the Bibliothèque générale et Archives.
- Abdul Aziz al-Harbi (living), professor of Qur'anic exegesis at Umm al-Qura University.
