= Abdul Aziz al-Harbi =

Saudi Arabian scholar

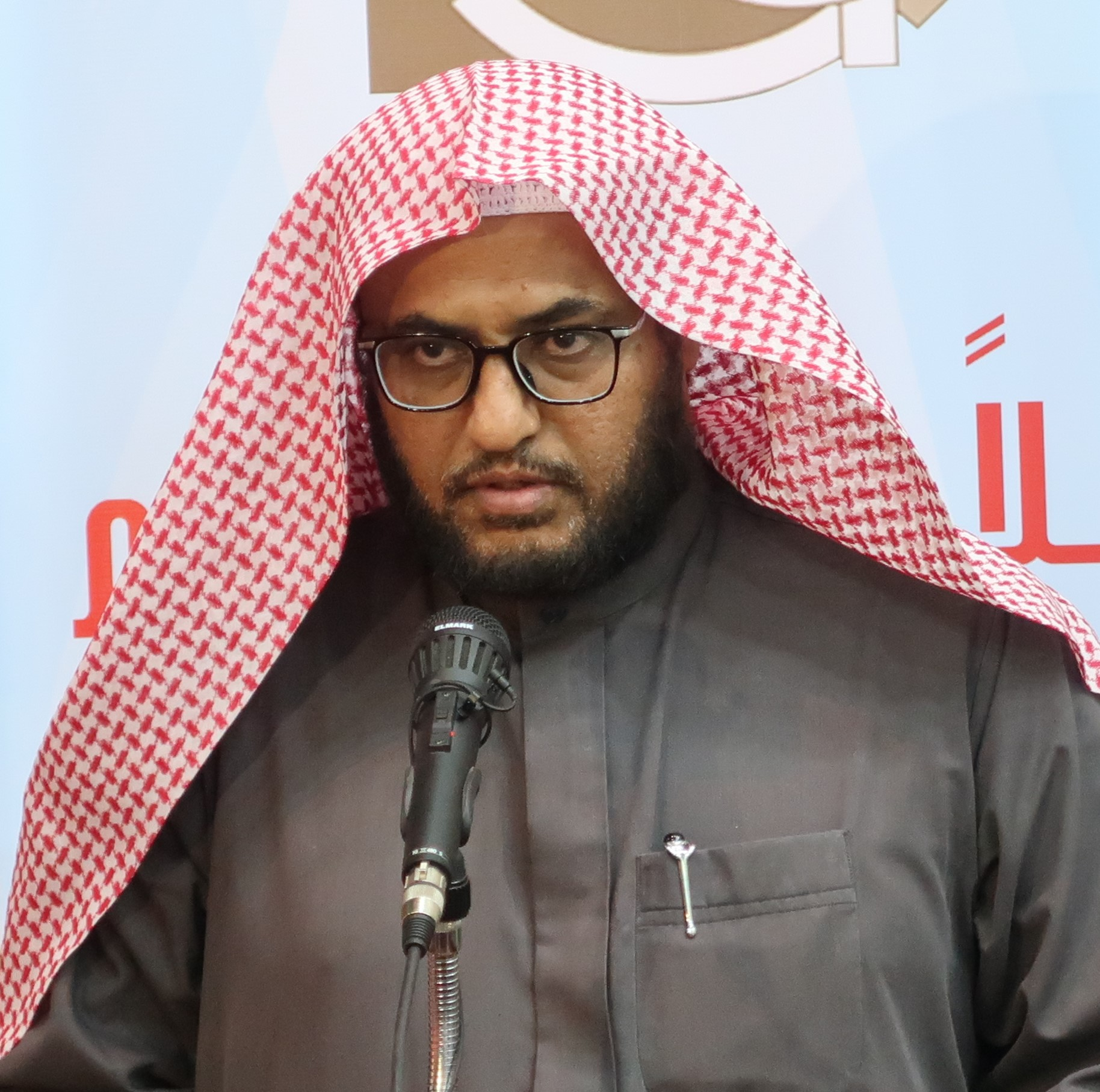

Personal life
- Born: 1965 (age 60–61) Mecca, Saudi Arabia
- Main interest(s): Tafsir, Arabic language
- Education: Islamic University of Madinah, Umm al-Qura University
- Occupation: Scholar

Religious life
- Religion: Islam
- Denomination: Sunni
- Jurisprudence: Zahiri
- Creed: Athari

Abdul Aziz bin Ali al-Harbi (Arabic: عبد العزيز بن علي الحربي) is a Saudi Arabian Islamic scholar and associate professor at Umm al-Qura University in Mecca. He is one of the founders and the current president of the Arabic Language Academy in Mecca.

== Career ==
A native of Mecca, Harbi memorized the entirety of the Qur'an by the age of eleven.

Harbi earned a Bachelor of Arts degree in Exegesis of the Qur'an, known to Muslims as Tafsir, from Islamic University of Madinah in 1989. Nine years later, he completed a Master of Arts degree in the Muslim prophetic tradition, known as the Sunnah, at Umm al-Qura University, where he would eventually complete his Doctorate of Philosophy in Qur'anic exegesis in 2001. He was promoted to the rank of associate professor at Umm al-Qura in 2006, and currently teaches exegesis. He is also a member of the university's academic board.

Harbi also has an Ijazah authorization in all ten Qira'at, or variant methods of reciting the Qur'an, with a complete chain of narration going back to the original reciters of the Qur'an. The majority of his published works, however, have been within the field of the Arabic language, especially in regard to Arabic rhetoric.

== Awards ==
On September 21, 2022, he received the King Salman Global Academy for Arabic Language Award in the category of Promoting Linguistic Awareness.

== Books ==
=== He authored a collection of books and theses in various fields, including ===
- In the Science of Hadith:
1. Guidance on the Difficulties in the Ten Arabic Readings (Printed)
2. The Pauses and Stoppings in the Qur'an (Printed)
3. The Saktat of Hafs, from the Shatibiyyah Path and their Explanation (Printed)
4. Al-Jazariyyah Expounded (A Commentary on Al-Jazari’s Poem on Tajweed) (Printed)
5. The Effect of Differences in the Qur'an on Pauses and Stopping Points (Printed)
6. The Orientalist’s Commentary on the Small Book of Weak Hadith by Al-Bukhari (Printed)
7. The Explanation of the Orientalist's Commentary (Printed)
- In Jurisprudence and its Fundamentals:
1. Summary of the Fatwas of Imam Ibn Taymiyyah (Printed)
2. Al-Mussafa in Islamic Jurisprudence (Printed)
3. The Cloudy Path (A Book on Inheritance Law) (Printed)
4. The Summary of Fiqh Principles (Printed)
5. Matters from Fiqh Novels According to the Methodology of the Ahl al-Zahir (Not yet printed)
- In Tafsir (Qur'anic Exegesis):
1. Handshakes with Two Hands (Printed)
2. Pilgrimage Once in a Lifetime (Printed)
3. An Investigation into a Part of Al-Nasafi’s Tafsir (Doctoral Thesis)
4. The Face of the Day that Reveals the Meanings of the Words of the One Who is the Omnipotent (Printed)
5. The Middle Face of the Day, Four Volumes (Currently in Printing)
- In Syntax (Grammar):
1. The Easy Explanation of Ibn Malik's Alfiyyah (Printed)
2. The Simplified Commentaries on the Ajrumiyyah Text (Printed)
3. The Essence of the Alfiyyah (Ibn Malik's Alfiyyah) (Printed)
4. The Olive Tree with its Explanation (A Brief Poem) (Printed)
- In Morphology (Sarf):
1. The Partitioning of the Qur'an (Printed)
2. The Meaning of the Spirit in the Qur'an (Printed)
3. The Qura’blānah in the Science of Morphology (Printed)
4. The Brief Explanation of the Words in the Lami’ah of the Actions (Printed)
- In Creed and Sects:
1. Al-Kifayah in Creed, Sects, and Schools of Thought (Printed)
2. Guidance to the Meanings of the Verses of Al-Kifayah (Printed)
3. In Linguistics and its Jurisprudence:
4. The Explanation of the Poem of the Elderly Woman on Verbal Ambiguity (Printed)
- In Prosody (Ilm al-'Arud):
1. The Prescribed Share in the Science of Prosody (Printed)
- In Various Sciences and Knowledge:
1. What Blows and What Happens, A Poem and Its Explanation (Printed)
2. The Raa'iya Poem on Knowledge and Arts, with its Explanation (In printing)
3. The Concise Guide in Research, Investigation, and Writing (Printed)
4. Summary of Peer-Reviewed Research on Mecca Al-Mukarramah (at the Institute of Scientific Research, Umm Al-Qura University) (Not yet printed)
5. Memoirs (Printed)
6. Secrets of the Soul, Questions and Revelations (Printed)
7. Between the Two Shores, A Collection of Sermons (Printed)
8. From the Side of the Valley, A Collection of Sermons (Printed)
9. Provision for the Journey, A Collection of Sermons (Printed)
10. Insight and Remembrance, A Collection of Sermons (In printing)
11. The Effectiveness of Terminological Definitions in the Sciences of Sharia and Arabic (Printed)
12. Short Fatwas (Printed)
13. The Mystical, A Poetic Enigma (Printed)
14. Pages, A Collection of Letters (Printed)
15. Fear in the Life of Mother Musa (Peace be Upon Her) (Printed)
16. An Alfiyyah in Medicine (Not yet compiled)
17. The Second Journey of "What Blows and What Happens" (Being collected)
18. Seven Sheets and Eight Research Papers (Printed)
19. A Brief History (Not yet printed)
20. The Ultimate Goal (The Stick) (Printed)
21. Keys to the Passage (Explanation of Ibn Duraid) (Printed)
22. The Amazing (Printed)
23. The Scene (Printed)
24. Arabic, the Intelligence (Printed)
25. Fatwas in Language and Tafsir (Printed)
26. The Journey to the Lami'ah of Al-Shanfarā (Printed)
- In Language Correction and Spelling:
1. The Fault in Speech: Correcting and Criticizing Common Words and Sentences (Printed)
2. The Engraving in Spelling Rules and Punctuation Marks (Printed)
- In Rhetoric:
1. The Easy Rhetoric (Printed)
2. The Poetic Structure of Praise for the Intercessor (Printed)
3. The Embellishment of the Poetic Structure (Printed)
4. Placing the Obvious in the Position of the Hidden (Printed)
- In Literature:
1. The One with Sleeves (Literary Assemblies) (Printed)
2. Comments on "The Collar of the Dove" by Ibn Hazm (Printed)
3. The One with Beauty (Annual Poems on the Arabic Language) (In printing)
4. A Collection of Poems (Not yet compiled)
5. Details of Sentences (Explanation of the Lami'ah of Ibn al-Wardi) (Printed)
6. Official and Literary Correspondence (In printing)
7. The Advisor in Explaining Ibn al-Qanas’s Poem (Printed)
8. The One with Beauty (Poems on the Arabic Language) (In printing)
- In Lexicography:
1. The Jallnblaq Book (An Introduction to Language Dictionaries) (Printed)
