= Zahiri Revolt =

Revolt during Mamluk Saltunate

Date	August 1386
Location	Damascus, Mamluk Sultanate 33.511667°N 36.301944°E
Result	Mamluk victory • Revolt suppressed

Belligerents
Mamluk Sultanate (Burji dynasty)	Zahirite rebels Syrian Bedouin tribes

Commanders and leaders
Barquq	Al-Burhan Ahmad al-Zahiri; Khalid al-Himsi

Casualties and losses
None	5 captured (2 died while incarcerated)

The Zahiri Revolt was a conspiracy leading to a failed coup d'état against the government of the 14th-century Mamluk Sultanate, having been characterized as both a political struggle and a theological conflict. While the initial support for the potential overthrow of the sultan began in Egypt, movement of Egyptian ideological agitators to Syria eventually caused the actual planned uprising to take place in Damascus in 1386. Rallying around Ahmad al-Zahiri, a cleric of the Zahirite school of Sunni Islam, the agitators mobilized from Hama to the capital. Having failed to secure the support of both the Mamluks and local Arab tribes, they were arrested by the authorities of Barquq before armed conflict could even take place.

Although not all those taking part in the revolt accepted the views of the Zahiri school of law, the term was used to denote all of those willing to participate in armed conflict against the Mamluk sultan. The suppression of the revolt both practically and ideologically has been described as a sign of the Mamluk authorities' intolerance for non-conformist ideas and willingness to interfere in religious issues normally considered the domain of theologians in Muslim empires.

== Background ==
In December 1382, Muslim jurist Ibn Abi al-Izz of the Hanafite school came under investigation for his theological criticism of a poem which would eventually be discredited, though not before the jurist's short inquisition. On 27 December that year, an affidavit was signed by the Sultan Barquq condemning the jurist as well as calling for an investigation of rumors regarding other jurists promoting the Zahirite school of Sunni Muslim law in Damascus. The four jurists rumored to be promoting non-conformist views were simply nicknamed al-Qurashi, Ibn al-Jabi, Ibn al-Husbani and Sadr ad-Din al-Yasufi.

Four years later, a Syrian Hanbalite known as Khalid of Homs, who was actually from Aleppo, moved to Damascus under the tutelage of the Sufi ascetic Ahmad ibn Muhammad ibn Isma'il ibn Abd al-Rahim Shihab ad-Din Abu Hashim al-Zahiri, also known as al-Burhan. During this time, a number of Egyptians who had been influenced by Zahirite theology emigrated to Syria. Burhan engaged in study of Ibn Hazm's book Al-Muhalla alongside Yasufi, with Ibn al-Jabi and Ibn al-Husbani following the other two. Qurashi, on the other hand, associated with the above four only for the purpose of studying but disliked Burhan's personally.

== Discovery ==
In August 1386, Khalid of Homs visited a local bedouin chief imprisoned in the Citadel of Damascus to seek support for the overthrow of the sultan and the installation of a caliphate, Barquq himself having overthrown the caliph al-Mutawakkil Muhammad ibn Abi Bakr in order to come to power. The chief suggested that Khalid speak with Ibn al-Himsi, the Citadel's top official with no relation to Khalid despite the similar-sounding name, as he would likely support the overthrow.

Khalid informed the Citadel's commanding officer of the plot, claiming not only to have the backing of local bedouin tribes and urban Damascenes but also to have located a suitable candidate for a new caliph. The officer gave the impression that he supported the plot and asked to meet this new caliph, upon which Khalid revealed him to be Burhan and even gave the officer the exact address of Burhan's house. The officer sent a request for Burhan's presence; upon his arrival, both he and Khalid were immediately arrested.

== Aftermath ==
In the absence of both the Citadel and Syria's governor Baydamur on leave, Ibn al-Himsi took up the acting role of governor. He wrote to Barquq in Cairo, adding in details of his own to the story. Ibn al-Himsi not only informed the sultan of the capture of two ringleaders but also accused the governor of being a co-conspirator, leading to the arrest of the governor, his son Muhammad Shah, his nephew Aladdin al-Khazindar and two deputies in Ramadan that same year, corresponding September 1386. In the weeks following the arrest of Burhan and Khalid, the focus shifted into a witch hunt for anyone connected to Baydamur, resulting in both political and financial sanctions.

Stemming from Burhan's confession, Yasufi was arrested and Ibn al-Husbani went into hiding. A second Hanbalite jurist, Amin ad-Din Ibn al-Najib of Baalbek, was also arrested as a co-conspirator; while he was not directly involved in the conspiracy, he had openly opposed the sultan in the past. In November 1386, Burhan and Khalid were transported to Cairo in order for sultan Barquq to meet them face to face. In their absence, a number of other local officials and clerics were arrested on suspicion of involvement in the conspiracy. Eventually, the prisoners filed a petition requesting to either be released or killed; they were instead shackled and given sentences of manual labor on public construction projects. This set off a chain reaction; local Damascenes, taking pity on the fallen politicians and clerics, began demonstrating at the construction sites in opposition to both the forced manual labor and the Burji administration in general. The military, fearing a spread of the revolt among the lower classes, immediately canceled the labor sentences and returned the prisoners to the Citadel. Opposition to the ruling dynasty increased when a local cleric, Yusuf al-Zuayfarini, began riding around the Citadel on a horse, claiming he would free Baydamur, popular with the common people of Damascus as both a religious cleric in his own right and for refusing to collect taxes levied by the Mamluks which had no origin in Islamic law. Zuayfarini's arrest was ordered as well, though like Ibn al-Husbani, he was able to avoid the Burji law enforcement.

On 24 December 1386, Burhan, Khalid and Ibn al-Najib arrived in Cairo. Charges were filed of a conspiracy to overthrow the Burji government and install a caliphate with a leader of Qurashi origins. On 16 January 1387, they were brought before the sultan personally for both interrogation and trial. Burhan was defiant, verbally accusing Barquq of misrule by appropriating taxes which had no textual basis in Islamic law and asserting his demand for a Qurashi leader. Uninterested in a polemical debate, Barquq simply ordered the prisoners to be tortured until they revealed the names of all their co-conspirators.

The fallen governor Baydamur's name was cleared, but not before he died alone in his cell at the Citadel in February 1387. In March 1389, Burhan and Khalid were released in Cairo having only served two years and seven months, due to the intercession of an influential Shafi'ite jurist; Ibn al-Najib, who had been sent back to Damascus, was released along with the other Zahirites in the Citadel a few days later. The only exception aside from Baydamur was Yasufi, who died in the Citadel in August 1387, more than a year before his comrades would be paroled.

== Legacy ==
While the revolt gained early momentum from Zahirite ideas, it is today viewed more in terms of the political agitation against the Mamluks and general displeasure with the marginalization of the caliphate. Historian Al-Maqrizi, normally removed from the topics of his writings, not only reported the revolt but sought to justify it theologically, likely due to his own status as a Zahirite. Maqrizi was also a direct student of Burhan in theology.
