= Ibn Khafif =

Persian Sufi

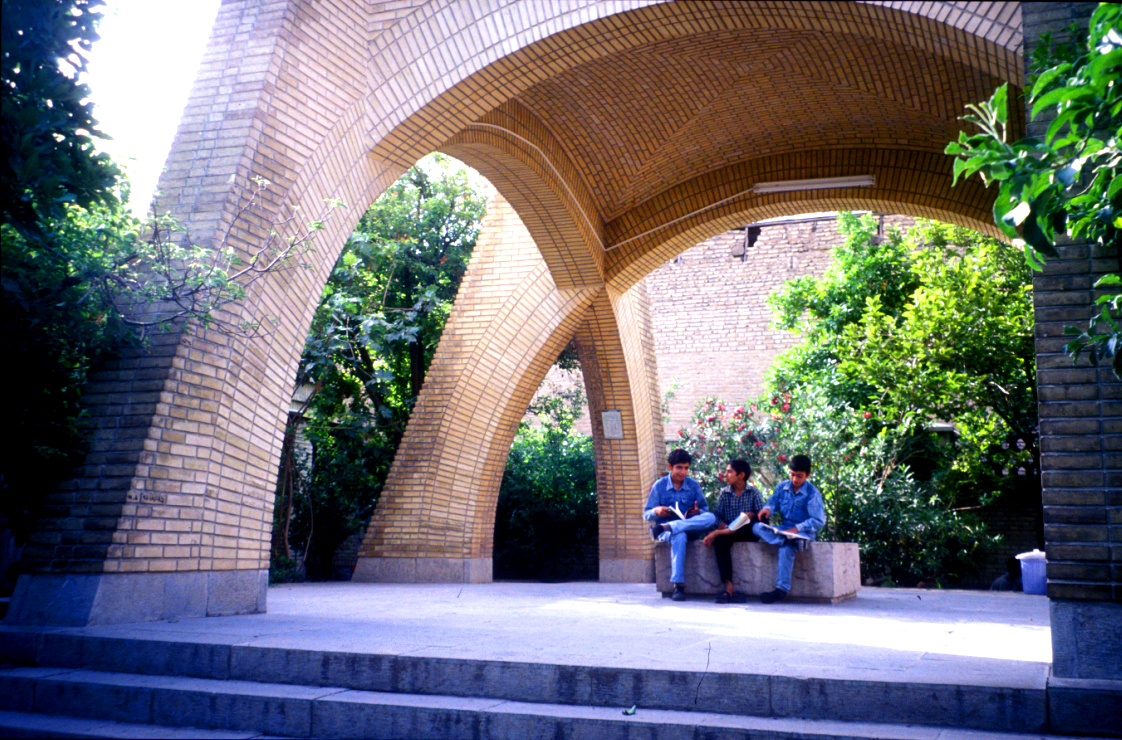
- The tomb of Ibn Khafif is in the old traditional quarters of Shiraz.

Personal life
- Born: 882, Shiraz
- Died: 371 AH (981/982 CE), Shiraz
- Era: Medieval era
- Region: Damascus

Religious life
- Religion: Islam
- Denomination: Sunni
- Jurisprudence: Shafi'i
- Creed: Ash'ari

Abu 'Abd Allah Muhammad ibn al-Khafif (882-982) known as al-Shaykh al-Kabir or Shaykh al-Shirazi was a Persian mystic and sufi from Iran. He is credited with bringing Sufism (tasawwuf) to Shiraz.

He was a Baghdad-educated Shafi'ite legal scholar who had also studied under al-Ash'ari, the theologian in Basrah. In Baghdad he knew Ruwaym, Hallaj, and Shibli. After spending much of his life away from his hometown of Shiraz, he returned there to die.

== Biography ==
His full name is Muhammad ibn Khafif ibn Asfakshad, Abu 'Abd Allah al-Shirazi al-Dibbi al-Shafi`i al-Sufi.

Abu 'Abd al-Rahman al-Sulami (d. 412/1021) said of him: "The Folk (al-Qawm, i.e. the Sufis) do not have anyone older than him nor more complete in his state and reality today." He once said: "If you hear the call to prayer and do not see me in the first row, look for me in the cemeteries." He took kalam from Imam Abu al-Hasan al-Ash'ari, fiqh from Ibn Surayj, and tasawwuf from Ruwaym, Abu Muhammad al-Jariri (d. 311/923-24), and Abu al-'Abbas ibn 'Ata' (d. 309/921-22 or 311/923-24). Al-Dhahabi said of him: "He is at the same time one of the most knowledgeable shaykhs in the external sciences ('ulum al-zahir)." Ibn Taymiyya names him among the great Sufi representatives of the Sunnah.

Ibn Khafif said, "In my beginnings I would recite in one cycle of prayer al-Ikhlas [Quranic chapter 112] ten thousand times, or recite the entire Qur`an in one cycle of prayer." Al-Sulami said, "Abu 'Abd Allah [ibn Khafif] came from a family of princes, but he practiced asceticism (zuhd) to the point that he said, 'I would collect rags from refuse-heaps, wash them, and mend whatever I could use for clothing, and I spent 14 months breaking my fast at night with a handful of beans.'"

Ibn Khafif reported from his teacher Ibn Surayj that the proof that love of Allah was a categorical obligation (fard) was in the verses: "Say: If your fathers, and your sons, and your brethren, and your wives, and your tribe, and the wealth you have acquired, and merchandise for which you fear that there will be no sale, and dwellings you desire are dearer to you than Allah and His messenger and striving in His way: then wait till Allah brings His command to pass. Allah guides not wrongdoing folk." (9:24) For punishment is not threatened except due to a categorical obligation.

He once said to the followers of Ibn Maktum: "Busy yourself with the acquisition of some knowledge, and do not let the words of the Sufis [to the contrary] fool you. I myself used to hide my inkwell and pen inside my clothes, and go secretly to visit the scholars. If they [the Sufis] had found out, they would have fought me and they would have said: You will not succeed. Later they found themselves needing me."

When Ibn Khafif became too weak to stand in his habitual supererogatory prayers, he prayed double their number sitting, in view of the Prophet's report whereby "The prayer of one sitting is half that of one standing." Ibn Bakuyah related from Ibn Khafif that he said: "In my beginnings, I would recite in one rak`a "Qul huwa Allahu ahad" [Sura Ikhlas:112] ten thousand times, or recite the entire Qur'an in one rak`a." "Never in 40 years was the Ramadan-end purification tax (zakat al-fitr) incumbent upon me."

He is buried in Shiraz, Iran. His tomb is a public library today.

== Works ==
The Collection of works of Ibn Khafif

The collected works of Ibn Khafīf Shirazi have been published for the first time in a two-volume set by Moein Kazemifar (Shiraz University, Iran), with collaboration and a foreword by Florian Sobieroj (Schiller University Jena, Germany). This two-volume collection includes all the extant works of Ibn Khafīf.

Kazemifar has aimed at offering a complete edition of the literary work of Ibn Khafīf. The two volumes presented by Dr. Moein Kazemifar (Muʿīn Kāẓimīfar) of Shiraz University include, besides the Arabic-language Awṣāf al-qulūb, the major extant works of Ibn Khafīf (d. 371/982) in the original Arabic and in Persian translation made by himself or by others.

The first volume includes the edition of Awṣāf al-qulūb, while the second volume offers the opera minora. Where Persian translations are extant, the texts are given in translation, such as the short Muʿtaqad Ibn al-Khafīf and the Waṣīyyat Ibn al-Khafīf, of which the Persian translations have been edited by Schimmel. The middle-sized texts al-Iqtiṣād and Faḍl al-taṣawwuf are offered in Persian translation made for the first time by Kazemifar. The Sharaf al-fuqarāʾ, only extant in Persian translation, is also offered in the second volume. Additionally, the auctorial texts of Ibn Khafīf have been incorporated into his compilation of transmitted prayers by Florian Sobieroj.

Awṣāf al-qulūb

The text, housed in the archives of the library of Āstān-i Quds-i Rażawī, is attributed to Abū ʿAbdallāh Ibn Khafīf-i Shīrāzī and titled Awṣāf al-qulūb. The length and content of this text far exceed those of any other known works by Ibn Khafīf (introduction, p. 4). Kazemifar highlights that, while Annemarie Schimmel omitted this text in her German-language introduction to Daylamī’s biography, Carl Brockelmann did mention it in Geschichte der arabischen Litteratur (supplement vol. 1, second ed., Leiden, 1996, p. 359) among the works ascribed to Ibn Khafīf (intr., p. 3). Fuat Sezgin, on the other hand, lists three works by Ibn Khafīf with extant manuscripts but does not include Awṣāf al-qulūb (GAS, Leiden, 1967, vol. 1, p. 664).

Moein Kazemifar, in an article, has provided three categories of evidence to demonstrate that the treatise Awṣāf al-qulūb is indeed authored by Ibn Khafīf. Kazemifar's analysis offers three proofs supporting the attribution of the work to Ibn Khafīf. First, he examines the isnāds (chains of transmission) that identify the individuals who transmitted the ḥadīths cited in Awṣāf al-qulūb (intr., p. 8). Second, he identifies a few literary parallels. Third, he correlates the journeys mentioned in the text with the travel accounts found in Daylamī’s Sīrat.

== See also ==
- List of Sufis
- List of Ash'aris and Maturidis
- Persian literature
- Awsaf al-qulub and Auctorial Texts of Ibn Khafif in his Compilation of Transmitted Prayers
- The Collection of works of Ibn Khafif (2 volume)M kazemifar, F Sobieroj
