= Abu al-Abbas al-Nabati =

Spanish botanist (1166–1239)

- Born: 1166; Seville
- Died: 1239 (aged 72–73)
- Known for: Scientific classification
- Scientific career
- Fields: Botanist, Scientist, Pharmacist, Jurist

Ahmad bin Muhammad bin Mufarraj bin Ani al-Khalil (fl. c. 1200), better known as Abu al-Abbas al-Nabati, Ibn al-Rumiya or al-Ashshab, (Arabic: أبو العباس النباتي, Abu’l-ʿAbbās al-Nabātī), was an Arab scientist, botanist, pharmacist and theologian from al-Andalus. He was a teacher of fellow Andalusian botanist Ibn al-Baitar.

== Life ==
Though often referred to by multiple nicknames, Nabati's birth name was Ahmad bin Muhammad bin Mufarrij bin Abdillah. Nabati was a descendant of freed slaves, and the nickname Ibn al-Rumiyah or "son of the Roman woman" was due to his mother's Byzantine Greek ethnicity, a fact which was said to cause Nabati a measure of embarrassment.

Born in Seville, Spain in 1166, Nabati traveled to North Africa, the Levant and Iraq while pursuing his education, eventually spending a period in Alexandria in 1216. He later returned to Seville and opened a pharmacy.

Nabati was also a theologian. Though he initially followed the Maliki school of Sunni Islam, Nabati later chose to switch to the Zahirite school, being described as a "fanatical" adherent of the teachings of Ibn Hazm. He died in 1240.

== Works ==
Upon his return to Spain, Nabati authored his famous work Botanical Journey, an early book on plant and herb species which he based on his observations around the world.

Nabati wrote a commentary on the book of Pedanius Dioscorides which bore the title Materia Medica after the term. Nabati's commentary was itself encyclopedic in nature, seeking to bring together the work of both Dioscorides and Ibn Juljul, along with preceding traditions and Nabati's own original contributions on plants in the Iberian peninsula.

== See also ==
- Islamic science
- Islamic medicine
- Muslim Agricultural Revolution
- Islamic scholars
