= Ibn al-Mughallis =

Medieval Arab scholar

Personal life
- Born: Abdullah bin Ahmad bin Muhammad
- Died: 936
- Era: Islamic Golden Age (Abbasid era)
- Region: Abbasid Caliphate
- Occupation: Islamic Theologian, Scholar and jurist

Religious life
- Religion: Islam
- Denomination: Sunni
- Jurisprudence: Zahiri

Muslim leader
- Influenced by: Ibn Dawud, Tabari
- Influenced: Haydarah bin `Umar, Qadi `Abd Allah bin Muhammad, and legal scholar `Ali bin Khalid Al-Basri.

Abdallāh ibn Aḥmad ibn Muḥammad (Arabic: عبد الله أحمد بن محمد), better known as Ibn al-Mughallis (Arabic: ابن المغلس), was a medieval Arab Muslim theologian and jurist.

== Life ==
He was the son of the Hadith-scholar Ahmad ibn Muhammad Al-Mughallis Al-Baghdadi.

Ibn al-Mughallis was a student of al-Tabari. Ibn al-Mughallis praised his teacher extensively, referring to him as possessing both the greatest understanding and concern for scholarship of any theologian Ibn al-Mughallis had known. In particular, Ibn al-Mughallis considered Tabari's History of the Prophets and Kings to be one of the greatest books written at that point in history. Ibn al-Mughallis was also a student of Muhammad bin Dawud al-Zahiri, whose body he ritually washed as part of the Islamic funeral rite.

Ibn al-Mughallis later moved west, settling down in the Iberian Peninsula in what was then Islamic Spain. He died in the year 324 according to the Islamic calendar, corresponding to 936 on the Gregorian calendar.

== Legacy ==
Ibn al-Mughallis was a foremost jurist of the Zahirite school of Islamic law, and Zahirite jurisprudence was said to have become popular throughout the Muslim world due to his efforts.

Ibn al-Mughallis was supposedly instrumental in the removal of the Arab Banu Salama tribe from Huesca on the Upper March (Arabic: Al-Tagr al-A'la) of Al-Andalus. While initially hesitant when asked to pray to God for the defeat of Banu Salama, he eventually relented after witnessing a particularly revolting act of injustice. Ibn al-Mughallis, despite himself being an Arab, supported the Muslim Basque sayyid Bahlul Ibn Marzuq against the tribe's domination in Al-Andalus.

According to Ibn al-Nadim, he was famous for writing a systematic refutation of the rival Shafi'ite school of law. Due to Ibn al-Mughallis' poor political and personal relations with Abbasid vizier Ali ibn Isa al-Jarrah, and Jarrah's strong relations with clerics of the Shafi'ite rite, the Zahirite school fell out of favor with the government in Baghdad.
