= Al-Arabi (magazine) =

Kuwaiti monthly magazine

Al-Arabi العربي
- Editor: Ibrahim Al-Mulaifi
- Categories: Geography, Science, History, Nature, Literature, Politics
- Frequency: Monthly
- First issue: 1 December 1958; 66 years ago
- Country: Kuwait
- Language: Arabic
- Website: alarabi.info

Al-Arabi (Arabic: العربي, lit. 'The Arab') is a monthly magazine that focuses mainly on the culture, literature, art, politics, society, and economics of the Arab world. The first edition was published in December 1958, seeking to propound the ideology of Pan-Arabism. The magazine encourages public participation and makes use of photography and freelance work.

== History and profile ==
Al-Arabi was founded by the Government of Kuwait in an effort to establish a magazine that emphasizes Arabic literature. The monthly magazine has always been financially supported by the Kuwaiti Ministry of Information which is the main regulatory body of media in the country. Ahmad Zaki was selected as the first editor in chief of the magazine and the first publication of the magazine was issued in December 1958.

Since its first days, the magazine has addressed various important issues in both the Arabic and international communities dealing with all aspects of life. Many of the articles published were contributions from well-known authors, artists and poets; such as Abbas el-Akkad, Nizar Qabbani, Sa'id al-Afghani, Abdul Hadi Altazi, Ihsan Abbas, Yusuf Idris, Salah Abdel Sabour and Dalal Almutairi. The magazine stopped briefly for seven months during the Iraqi occupation of Kuwait from August 1990 to February 1991.

The 1958 first edition of the magazine

== List of Editors in Chief ==
- 1958-1975: Ahmad Zaki
- 1976-1982: Ahmad Baha Eldeen
- 1982-1999: Muhammad Ganiem Al-Romehe
- 1999–2013: Sulaiman Abrahim El-Askari
- 2013–2014: Adil Salim Al-Abd Al-Jadir
- 2014-present: Ibrahim Al-Mulaifi
