= Ruwaym =

Early Muslim jurist, ascetic and Sufi

Personal life
- Born: Baghdad
- Died: 915

Religious life
- Religion: Islam
- Denomination: Sunni
- Jurisprudence: Zahiri
- Tariqa: Malamatiyya
- Movement: Sufism

Muslim leader
- Influenced by: Dawud al-Zahiri
- Influenced: Ibn Khafif, Ibn Hazm

Abu Muhammad Ruwaym bin Ahmad was an early Muslim jurist, ascetic, saint and reciter of the Qur'an. He was one of the second generation of practitioners of Sufism (tasawwuf).

== Life ==
Ruwaym was an early teacher of Ibn Khafif, another famous mystic. Ruwaym has been described as both being on poor terms with Ibn Khafif's other teacher, Junayd of Baghdad, and with being a "friendly rival" and associate of Junayd's. In addition to his students, Ruwaym was a devoted family man, an attachment to the material world which put him in contrast to many other Sufi mystics at his time. Ruwaym spent some time as the deputy of the chief judge of Baghdad, his home town.

Ruwaym died in the year 303 of the Islamic calendar, corresponding to the year 915 on the Gregorian calendar.

== Views ==
One of the first practitioners of Sufism, Ruwaym viewed the practice as a resignation of the empirical self. Tawhid, under Ruwaym's definition, was the annihilation of humanity and the overarching importance of the divine. In fact, Ruwaym's humility was to the extent that shame was a virtue as no matter where a person went God is near, and a human being should be ashamed in such a situation. Less emphasis was placed on absolute trust in God for all things, and more on stewardship and responsibility. His influence within Sufism was strong early on, with many of Baghdad's early Sufis having been disciples of his. Ruwaym held a negative view of Mansur Al-Hallaj, initially believing in his miracles though later rejecting such claims.

In terms of Muslim jurisprudence, Ruwaym was a Zahirite, following the school of Dawud al-Zahiri. He was one of the school's important early jurists, being remembered by later adherent Ibn Hazm as one of the top leaders of the school.

== Works ==
Although Ruwaym was a Sufi, he was also critical of other practitioners due to perceived errors. His book Errors of the Ecstatics was a compilation of what he viewed as such errors. He also warned Muslims from the mainstream against arguing with Sufis about metaphysical matters of which the mainstream had little knowledge, viewing that such a person would lose faith and that such matters should be left to experts in Sufism.

=== Quotes ===
The following were recorded by Abu Bakr al-Kalabadhi, translated by Arthur John Arberry:

- "Satisfaction is the anticipation of the decrees (of God) with joy." (Kalabadhi 93)
- "Poverty is the non-existence of every existent thing, and the abandonment of every lost thing." (Kalabadhi 86)
- "The meaning of repentance is, that thou shalt repent of repentance." (Kalabadhi 83)
- The repentance of conversion is "that thou shouldst fear God because of the power He has over thee." (Kalabadhi 83)
- The repentance of repose is "that thou shouldst be ashamed before God because He is near thee." (Kalabadhi 83)
- "Sincerity is lifting one's regard from the deed." (Kalabadhi 90)

Commenting on the meaning of intimacy, Ruwaym observed: (Kalabadhi 99)

Thy beauty is my heart's delight,

And holds my mind unceasingly:

Thy love hath set me in Thy sight,

Estranged from all humanity.

Thy recollection comes to me

With friendly tidings from the Friend:

"Behold, as He hath promised thee

Thou shalt attain and gain thy end."

Wherever Thou mayst chance to light,

O Thou who are my soul's intent!

Thou comest clearly to my sight,

And in my heart art immanent.
