= Mundhir ibn Sa'īd al-Ballūṭī =

10th century Islamic scholar from Al-Andalus in the Iberian Peninsula

Mundhir bin Sa'īd al-Ballūṭī

Personal life
- Born: 887 Los Pedroches
- Died: 15 November 966
- Region: Iberian Peninsula
- Main interest: Islamic law
- Occupation: Judge

Religious life
- Religion: Islam
- Denomination: Sunni
- Jurisprudence: Zahiri

Muslim leader
- Influenced by: Dawud al-Zahiri
- Influenced: Ibn Hazm

Abu al-Hakam Mundhir ibn Sa'īd ibn Abd Allah ibn Abd ar-Rahman al-Ballūṭī (Arabic: أبو الحكم المنذر بن سعيد بن عبدالله بن عبدالرحمن البلوطي) (887 – 15 November 966) was a Muslim legal expert and judiciary official in Al-Andalus. In addition to his legal career, he was also considered a prominent theologian, academic, linguist, poet and intellectual.

== Biography ==
=== Background ===
Balluti's exact date of birth is disputed, with historians listing the year as both 886 and 887. He was born and raised in Los Pedroches in the mountainous region of Cordoba Province, northwest of Córdoba, Andalusia. Balluti's family, however, was originally from North Africa of Berber origins. He came from a religiously active family, and his sister was notable as a Muslim woman who founded her own monastery known as a Ribat where she and other women could devote their lives solely to piety and religious scholarship.

=== Education ===
Balluti initially studied Islamic studies in the capital of Andalus, later traveling east both for the sake of his education and to perform the Muslim pilgrimage at Mecca, which he completed in 921. He studied in various regions under a number of different teachers before traveling to Cairo in order to study Arabic grammar and literature. Later gaining some renown as a linguist in his own right, he was also known as a poet.

=== Death ===
Balluti died in his hometown of Cordoba in 15 November 966. He was 82 years old.

== Judicial career ==
=== As Chief Judge ===
Initially, Balluti served as the chief judge of Mérida. Later, he served as the judge of the Umayyad Caliph of Cordoba Abd-ar-Rahman III from 949 until his death under the reign of Al-Hakam II.

During the zenith of Byzantine-Andalusian relations, Emperor Constantine VII joined a succession of Christian rulers meeting with Muslim officials. During one of these meetings, Balluti delivered an oration upon the reception of a group of Byzantine envoys at Abd-arRahman III's palace, expressing his extremely positive views of the caliph and the obligation of the people of Spain to obey their ruler; he was subsequently appointed to the position of the caliphate's top judicial official. Balluti's speech is still preserved as an accurate description of the caliph's court and palace at the time.

=== Legalistic Views ===
Although he did not adhere to the Maliki school of law favored by the Umayyad dynasty, Balluti was still the chief judge of Cordoba during his twilight years; it is thought that he kept his Zahirite views to himself and his family without attempting to spread them. In addition to his position on the judge's bench, Al-Hakam II also appointed him as a professor. Balluti's appointment despite his personal convictions was considered by Islamic scholar William Montgomery Watt to indicate that while the Umayyad remnants favored the Malikite school, they were not willing to grant it absolute monopoly.

Although Balluti was willing to keep his juristic views to himself, he was not as soft-spoken regarding his views on morality. When Abd-ar-Rahman III attempted to cover the ceiling of his palace Medina Azahara in gold and silver, the extravagance was too excessive for Balluti to accept, prompting him to encourage the caliph to stop; he even went as far as to say the Devil was tempting the caliph with such excess.

== Legacy ==
Balluti was considered by Ibn Khaldun to be one of the six individuals from the Berber people who became well known throughout history for a strong knowledge of Islamic studies.

=== Creed ===
Balluti was accused of holding to the doctrine of the Mu'tazilites, a sect within Islam which had mostly become extinct at the time. Historian Maribel Fierro has argued that this is not possible due to Balluti's polemics regarding Christian-Muslim dialogue. When reviewing the conversion document of a former Christian, Balluti rejected the individual's Muslim testimony of faith due to the wording: "Muhammad is God's messenger, and Jesus is God's messenger and His word." The wording as an incomplete quote of a verse from the Qur'an.

Balluti argued that if Jesus is God's word, but also a mortal, created being, then God's word – meaning the Qur'an – would also be created, rather than eternal; he also pointed out that a Byzantine Emperor – likely Theophilos – rebuked the Abbasid caliph Al-Ma'mun for believing Jesus is the word of God, and that the Qur'an is uncreated, yet also believing that Jesus was a mortal man. Thus, if the individual wanted to use the aforementioned verse in their testimony of faith, they would need to quote the verse in its entirety for the sake of context before Balluti would be willing to approve the conversion documents. The belief that the Qur'an was created rather than eternal was championed by the Mu'tazilites and opposed by textualists such as Ahmad ibn Hanbal, thus negating the claim that Balluti could have been the former rather than the latter. Later documents of Christian conversions to Islam in Spain were written in the same formula proposed by Balluti, indicating that his argument had gained official acceptance.

== See also ==
- Qadi
- Ulema
